= Hyde Park, Vermont =

Hyde Park, Vermont, may refer to:

- Hyde Park (town), Vermont, a town in and the shire town (county seat) of Lamoille County, Vermont, United States.
- Hyde Park (village), Vermont, a village in the town of Hyde Park, Vermont, United States
- North Hyde Park, Vermont, a village in the town of Hyde Park, Vermont, United States
