= Hyde Park (town), Vermont =

Hyde Park, Vermont
- Town
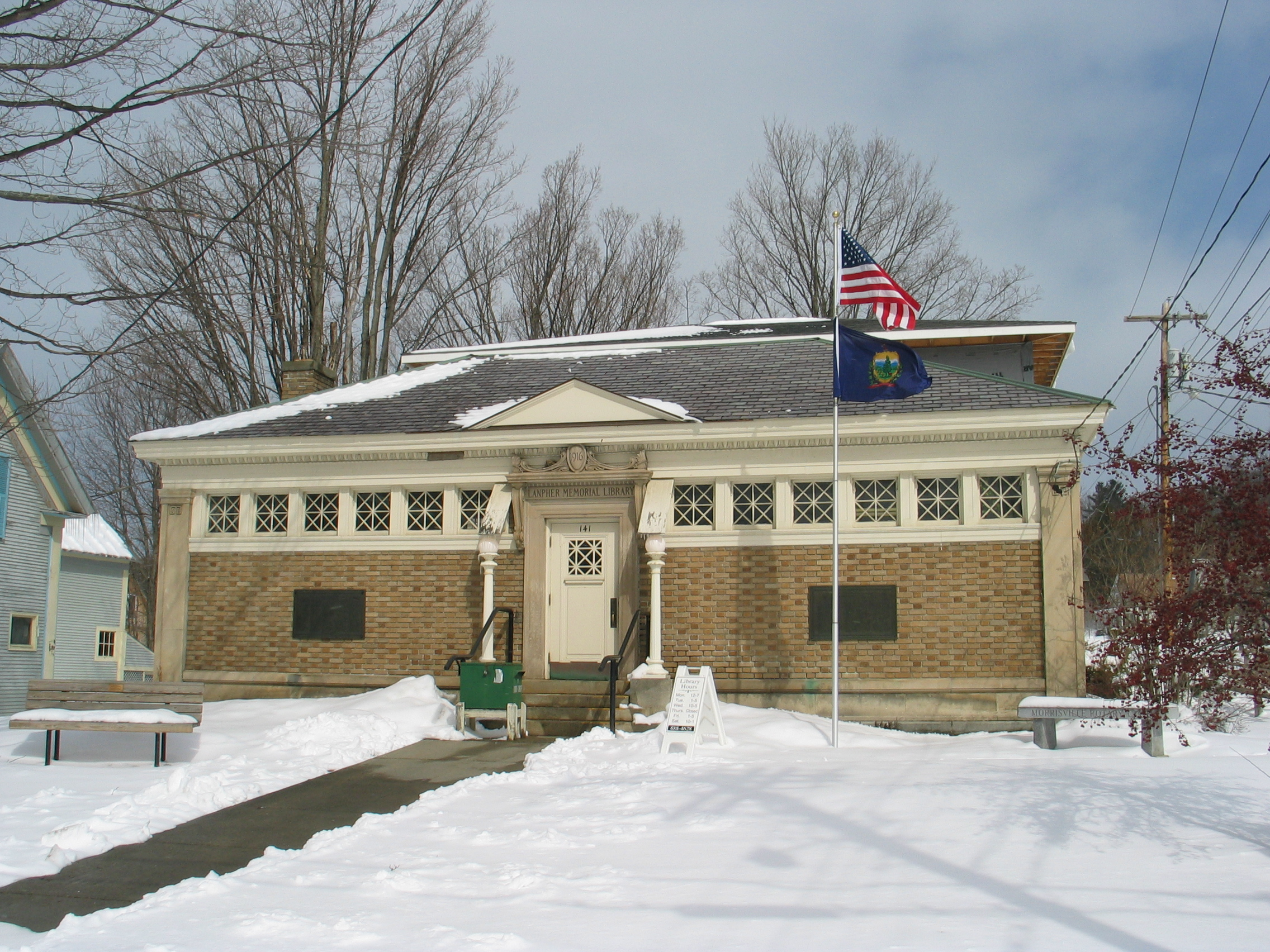
- Hyde Park library

- Logo

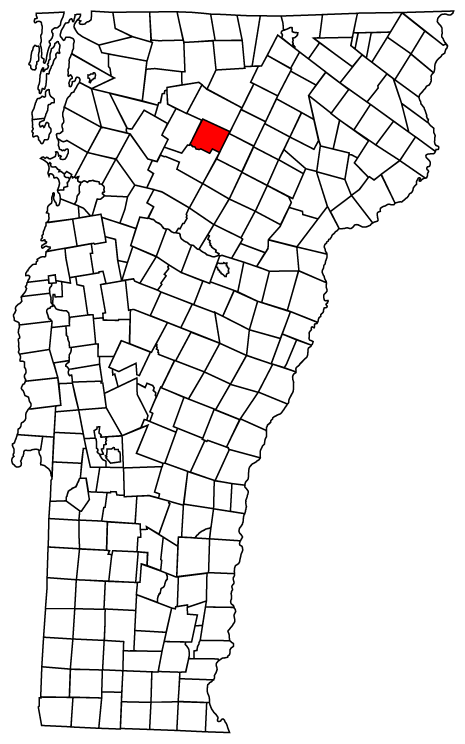
- Location of Hyde Park in Vermont
- Coordinates: 44°37′28″N 72°33′52″W
- Country: United States
- State: Vermont
- County: Lamoille
- Communities: Hyde Park; North Hyde Park; Centerville

Area
  - Total: 38.9 sq mi (100.8 km^{2})
  - Land: 37.6 sq mi (97.4 km^{2})
  - Water: 1.4 sq mi (3.5 km^{2}) 3.43%
- Elevation: 1,142 ft (348 m)

Population (2020)
  - Total: 3,020
  - Density: 80/sq mi (31/km^{2})
- Time zone: UTC-5 (EST)
  - Summer (DST): UTC-4 (EDT)
- ZIP code: 05655
- Area code: 802
- FIPS code: 50-35050
- GNIS feature ID: 1462122
- Website: hydeparkvt.com

Hyde Park is a town in and the shire town (county seat) of Lamoille County, Vermont, United States. The town was named for Captain Jedediah Hyde, an early landowner who was a veteran of the American Revolutionary War. The population was 3,020 at the 2020 census. There is also a village of the same name within the town.

== Geography ==
Hyde Park is in east-central Lamoille County, northeast of the Lamoille River valley. According to the United States Census Bureau, the town has a total area of 38.9 square miles (100.8 km^{2}), of which 37.6 square miles (97.4 km^{2}) are land and 1.4 square miles (3.5 km^{2}), or 3.43%, are water. The village of Hyde Park is in the southern part of the town.

Vermont Route 15 crosses the southern part of the town, passing through Hyde Park village; it leads northwest 5 miles (8 km) to Johnson and southeast 15 miles (24 km) to Hardwick. Vermont Route 100 runs with Route 15 between Hyde Park village and Morrisville to the south. Route 100 leads north through North Hyde Park 33 miles (53 km) to the Newport area, while to the south it leads 11 miles (18 km) to Stowe.

=== Climate ===
Climate data for Hyde Park, VT
Month	Jan	Feb	Mar	Apr	May	Jun	Jul	Aug	Sep	Oct	Nov	Dec	Year
Average precipitation inches	3.02	2.73	3.07	3.60	4.06	4.76	4.65	4.35	3.94	4.49	3.52	3.56	45.75
Average precipitation mm	77	69	78	91	103	121	118	110	100	114	89	90	1,160
Source: NOAA

== Demographics ==
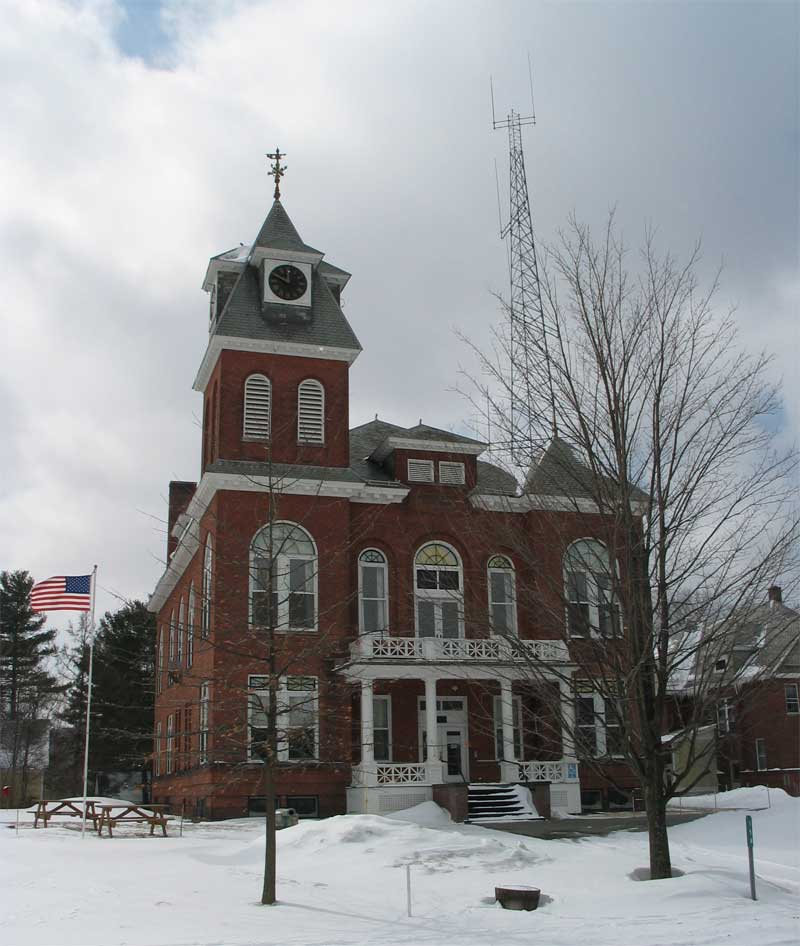
Lamoille County Courthouse, Hyde Park, designed by Zachary Taylor Austin in 1911

Historical population
Census	Pop.	Note	%±
1790	43		—
1800	110		155.8%
1810	261		137.3%
1820	373		42.9%
1830	823		120.6%
1840	1,080		31.2%
1850	1,107		2.5%
1860	1,409		27.3%
1870	1,624		15.3%
1880	1,715		5.6%
1890	1,633		−4.8%
1900	1,472		−9.9%
1910	1,453		−1.3%
1920	1,323		−8.9%
1930	1,165		−11.9%
1940	1,178		1.1%
1950	1,291		9.6%
1960	1,219		−5.6%
1970	1,347		10.5%
1980	2,021		50.0%
1990	2,344		16.0%
2000	2,847		21.5%
2010	2,954		3.8%
2020	3,020		2.2%
U.S. Decennial Census

As of the census of 2000, there were 2,847 people, 1,138 households, and 780 families residing in the town. The population density was 75.2 people per square mile (29.0/km^{2}). There were 1,220 housing units at an average density of 32.2/sq mi (12.4/km^{2}). The racial makeup of the town was 97.75% White, 0.53% Black or African American, 0.53% Native American, 0.39% Asian, and 0.81% from two or more races. Hispanic or Latino of any race were 0.77% of the population.

There were 1,138 households, out of which 31.7% had children under the age of 18 living with them, 53.7% were couples living together and joined in either marriage or civil union, 9.3% had a female householder with no husband present, and 31.4% were non-families. 24.4% of all households were made up of individuals, and 9.5% had someone living alone who was 65 years of age or older. The average household size was 2.49 and the average family size was 2.92.

In the town, the population was spread out, with 24.7% under the age of 18, 7.3% from 18 to 24, 28.7% from 25 to 44, 26.7% from 45 to 64, and 12.5% who were 65 years of age or older. The median age was 38 years. For every 100 females, there were 98.4 males. For every 100 females age 18 and over, there were 96.2 males.

The median income for a household in the town was $38,650, and the median income for a family was $44,185. Males had a median income of $30,000 versus $25,304 for females. The per capita income for the town was $20,293. About 3.2% of families and 5.8% of the population were below the poverty line, including 4.4% of those under age 18 and 7.1% of those age 65 or over.

== Villages and bygone villages ==
- Garfield is located in the northeast corner of Hyde Park. In the late 1800s, Garfield was a village with a store, a post office (added in 1890), a school, and two sawmills. In 1922 the sawmill owned by Charles William Manning (1864–1946) burned down and he decided not to replace it, causing the loss of many jobs. Residents began to leave Garfield. Eventually their abandoned farms reverted to wilderness. The area remains thickly wooded and sparsely developed to this day. It is best known as the Morrisville turnoff point for the Green River Reservoir State Park.
- Hyde Park village is in the southern part of town, on a hill rising above the north bank of the Lamoille River
- North Hyde Park is in the northwest corner of the town, along the Gihon River. Part of the settled area extends west into the town of Johnson.
- Centerville is in the center of the town, along Centerville Road where it crosses Centerville Brook, a south-flowing tributary of the Lamoille.

== Notable people ==
- Susan Bartlett, member of the Vermont State Senate
- Frank Ellis Boynton, American botanist
- Vernon A. Bullard, United States Attorney for the District of Vermont
- Benjamin N. Hulburd, Chief Justice of the Vermont Supreme Court
- Roger W. Hulburd, Lieutenant Governor of Vermont
- Carroll S. Page, United States senator
- Wayne H. Page, Adjutant General of the Vermont National Guard
- George M. Powers, Chief Justice of the Vermont Supreme Court
- H. Henry Powers, United States congressman
- Anson P. K. Safford, governor of the Arizona Territory
- Mary J. Safford, pioneering female physician

== See also ==
- List of municipalities in Vermont
