= Belvidere Center, Vermont =

- Village
- Location within Vermont Location within the United States
- Coordinates: 44°45′00″N 72°41′28″W
- Country: United States
- State: Vermont
- County: Lamoille
- Town: Belvidere
- Elevation: 866 ft (264 m)
- Time zone: UTC-5 (Eastern (EST))
  - Summer (DST): UTC-4 (EDT)
- ZIP code: 05442
- Area code: 802
- GNIS feature ID: 1456386

Belvidere Center is an unincorporated village in the town of Belvidere, Lamoille County, Vermont, United States. The community is located along Vermont Route 109, 7.9 miles (12.7 km) north of the village of Johnson. Belvidere Center had a post office from July 21, 1887, until February 14, 2004; it still has its own ZIP code, 05442.
