= Morristown, Vermont =

- Town
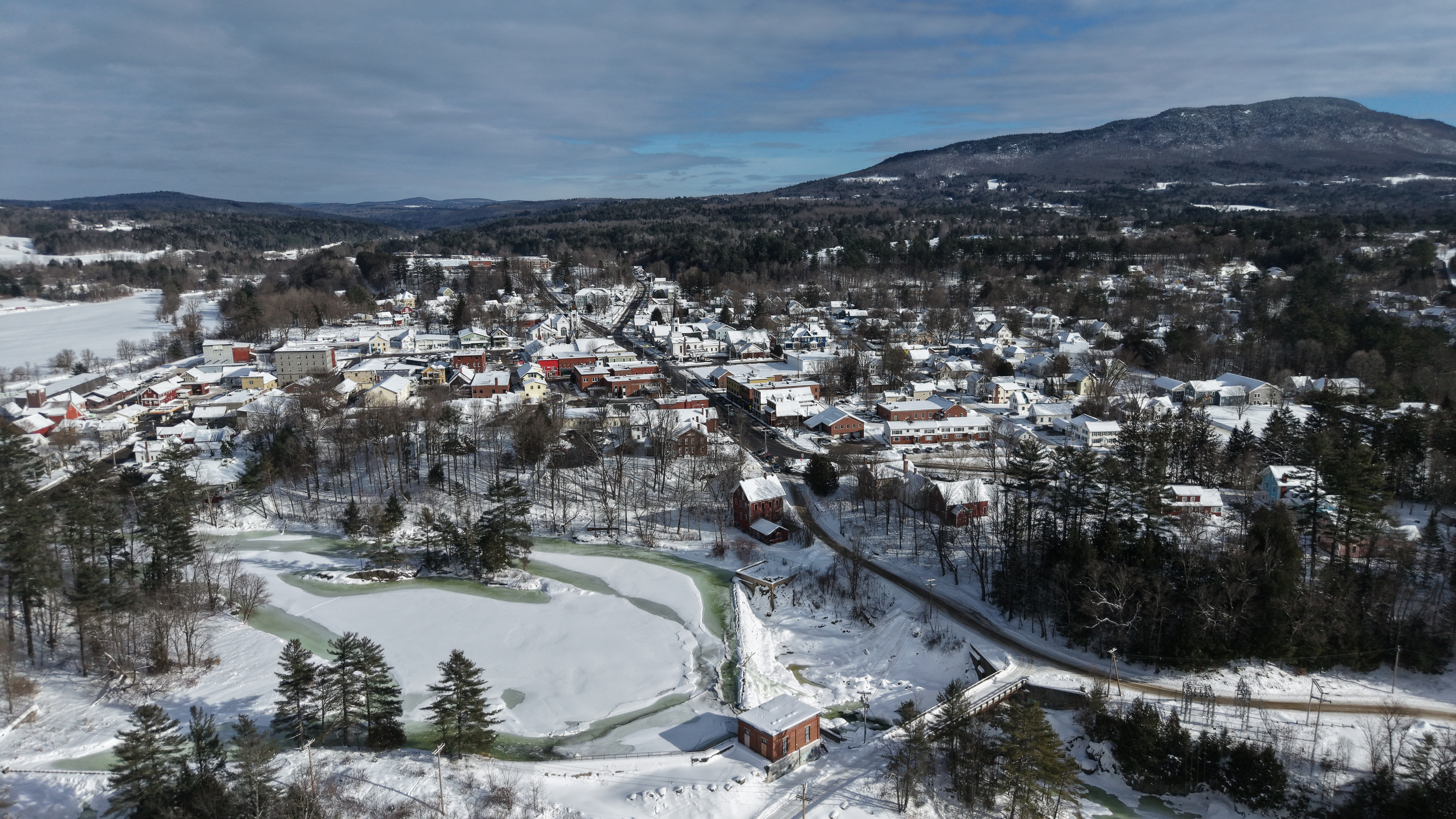
- Morristown, VT, from the west

- Logo
- Motto: "Where Art, Food, & History Meet"
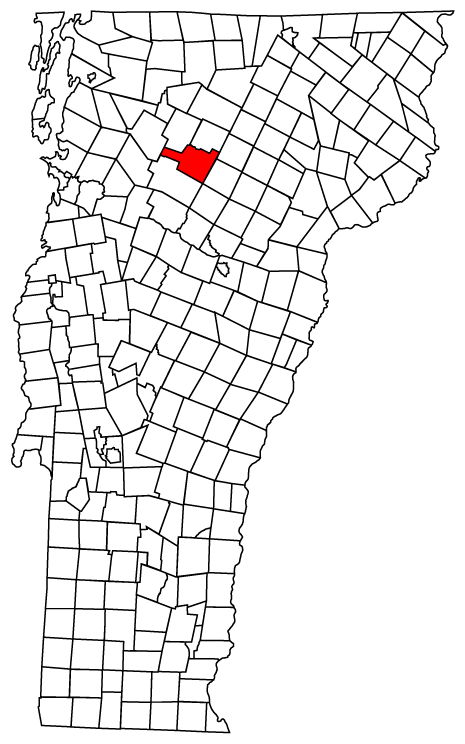
- Morristown, Vermont
- Coordinates: 44°31′33″N 72°37′54″W
- Country: United States
- State: Vermont
- County: Lamoille
- Communities: Cadys Falls; Morristown; Morrisville

Area
  - Total: 51.68 sq mi (133.85 km^{2})
  - Land: 51.15 sq mi (132.48 km^{2})
  - Water: 0.53 sq mi (1.37 km^{2})
- Elevation: 1,076 ft (328 m)

Population (2020)
  - Total: 5,434
  - Density: 106.2/sq mi (41.02/km^{2})
- Time zone: UTC-5 (Eastern (EST))
  - Summer (DST): UTC-4 (EDT)
- ZIP code: 05661
- Area code: 802
- FIPS code: 50-46675
- GNIS feature ID: 1462154
- Website: www.morristownvt.gov

Morristown is a town in Lamoille County, Vermont, United States. As of the 2020 census, the population was 5,434. Morristown is the largest town by population in Lamoille County, and its central village of Morrisville serves as the county's main commercial center.

== Geography ==
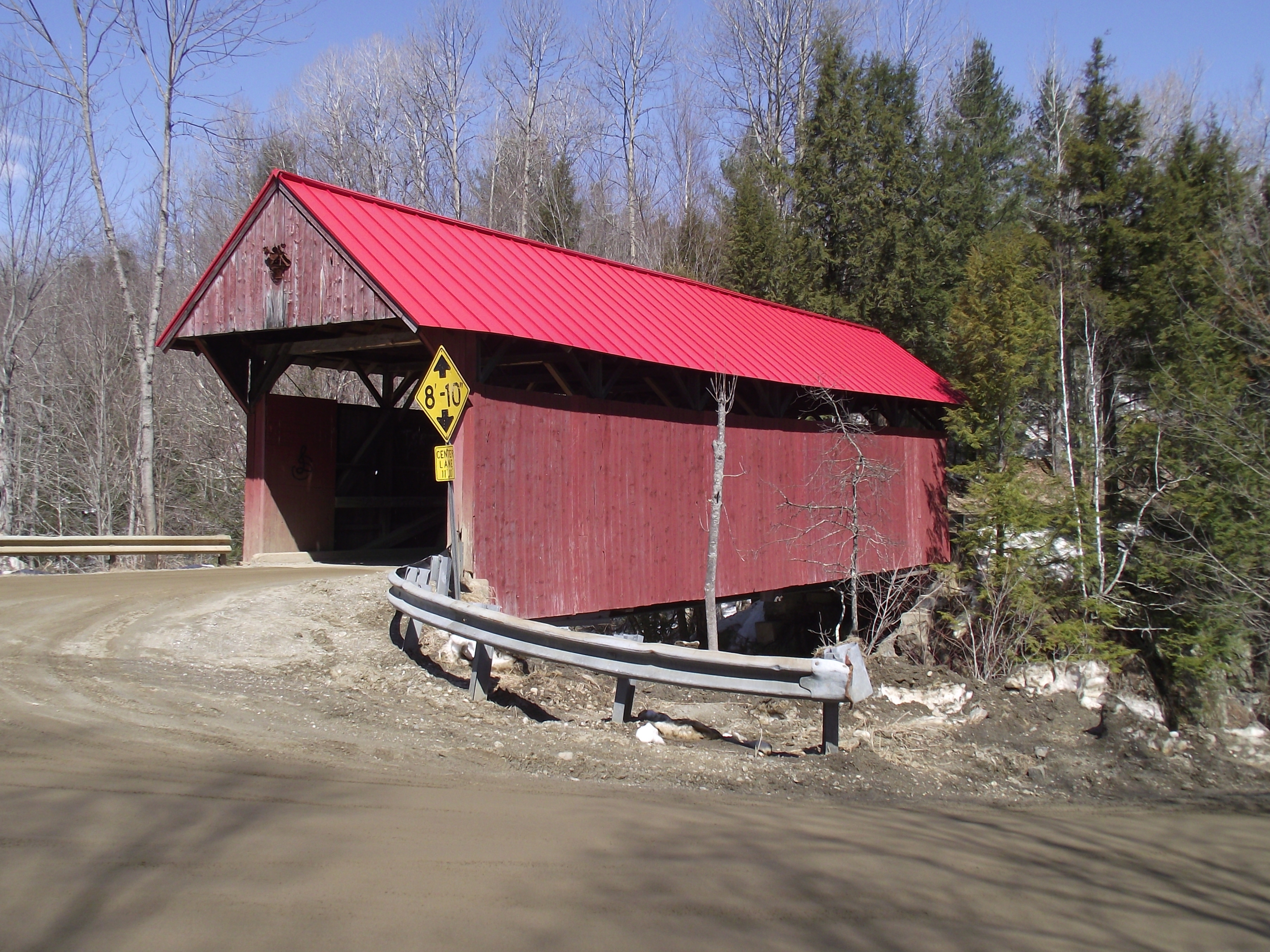
The Red Bridge in Sterling Valley

Morristown is in southern Lamoille County, to the east of the main range of the Green Mountains. The Lamoille River flows through the northern part of the town, with Ryder Brook and others joining the river from a broad valley to the south. The village of Morrisville is in the northern part of town along the Lamoille River, east of Lake Lamoille, a small reservoir. Several Vermont state highways converge in Morrisville. Vermont Route 100 leads northwest 3 miles (5 km) to Hyde Park, the Lamoille County shire town, and south 8 miles (13 km) to Stowe, while Vermont Route 12 leads southeast 26 miles (42 km) to Montpelier, the state capital. Vermont Route 15 passes through Morristown north of Morrisville village, leading northwest past Hyde Park 15 miles (24 km) to Jeffersonville and southeast 14 miles (23 km) to Hardwick. Vermont Route 15A leads east out of Morrisville, running 2 miles (3 km) to Route 15.

According to the United States Census Bureau, the town has a total area of 51.7 square miles (133.8 km^{2}), of which 51.2 square miles (132.5 km^{2}) are land and 0.54 square miles (1.4 km^{2}), or 1.02%, are water.

=== Climate ===
This climatic region is typified by large seasonal temperature differences, with warm to hot (and often humid) summers and cold (sometimes severely cold) winters. According to the Köppen Climate Classification system, Morristown has a humid continental climate, abbreviated "Dfb" on climate maps.

== Demographics ==
Historical population
Census	Pop.	Note	%±
1790	10		—
1800	144		1,340.0%
1810	550		281.9%
1820	726		32.0%
1830	1,315		81.1%
1840	1,502		14.2%
1850	1,441		−4.1%
1860	1,751		21.5%
1870	1,897		8.3%
1880	2,099		10.6%
1890	2,411		14.9%
1900	2,533		5.1%
1910	2,652		4.7%
1920	2,813		6.1%
1930	2,939		4.5%
1940	3,130		6.5%
1950	3,225		3.0%
1960	3,347		3.8%
1970	4,052		21.1%
1980	4,448		9.8%
1990	4,733		6.4%
2000	5,139		8.6%
2010	5,227		1.7%
2020	5,434		4.0%
U.S. Decennial Census

At the 2000 census there were 5,139 people, 2,101 households, and 1,317 families living in the town. The population density was 100.1 people per square mile (38.6/km^{2}). There were 2,271 housing units at an average density of 44.2 per square mile (17.1/km^{2}). The racial makeup of the town was 97.51% White, 0.35% African American, 0.35% Native American, 0.47% Asian, 0.12% from other races, and 1.21% from two or more races. Hispanic or Latino of any race were 0.78%.

Of the 2,101 households 31.3% had children under the age of 18 living with them, 46.5% were married couples living together, 12.2% had a female householder with no husband present, and 37.3% were non-families. 27.8% of households were one person and 10.2% were one person aged 65 or older. The average household size was 2.39 and the average family size was 2.92.

The age distribution was 24.2% under the age of 18, 7.6% from 18 to 24, 28.8% from 25 to 44, 24.1% from 45 to 64, and 15.3% 65 or older. The median age was 39 years. For every 100 females, there were 91.7 males. For every 100 females age 18 and over, there were 86.2 males.

The median household income was $33,359 and the median family income was $40,456. Males had a median income of $28,050 versus $21,014 for females. The per capita income for the town was $17,195. About 6.9% of families and 10.3% of the population were below the poverty line, including 11.1% of those under age 18 and 9.9% of those age 65 or over.

== Notable people ==
- H. Henry Powers, lawyer and U.S. congressman (1891–1901)
- Leslie M. Shaw, businessman and lawyer; U.S. treasury secretary (1902–1907); 17th governor of Iowa; 1908 candidate for the nomination of the Republican party
- Shap Smith, lawyer; Speaker of the Vermont House of Representatives (2009–2017)
