= North Hyde Park, Vermont =

Census-designated place in Vermont, United States

- Census-designated place
- Location within Vermont Location within the United States
- Coordinates: 44°40′12″N 72°35′35″W
- Country: United States
- State: Vermont
- County: Lamoille
- Towns: Hyde Park, Johnson, Eden

Area
  - Total: 2.78 sq mi (7.19 km^{2})
  - Land: 2.75 sq mi (7.13 km^{2})
  - Water: 0.027 sq mi (0.07 km^{2})
- Elevation: 856 ft (261 m)
- Time zone: UTC-5 (Eastern (EST))
  - Summer (DST): UTC-4 (EDT)
- ZIP Codes: 05665 (Hyde Park); 05656 (Johnson); 05652 (Eden)
- Area code: 802
- FIPS code: 50-50725
- GNIS feature ID: 2805705

North Hyde Park is an unincorporated village and census-designated place (CDP) in the towns of Hyde Park and Johnson, Lamoille County, Vermont, United States. The CDP was first drawn for the 2020 census. As of the 2020 census, North Hyde Park had a population of 403. North Hyde Park has a post office with ZIP code 05665, which opened on May 29, 1839.

== Geography ==
The community is located along Vermont Route 100 and the Gihon River 6 miles (10 km) north of the village of Hyde Park. Via Vermont Route 100C, it is 5 miles (8 km) northeast of the village of Johnson.

According to the U.S. Census Bureau, the North Hyde Park CDP has a total area of 2.8 square miles (7.2 km^{2}), of which 0.03 square miles (0.07 km^{2}), or 0.92%, are water. Portions of the CDP extend west into the town of Johnson and north into the town of Eden. Via the Gihon River, the community is part of the Lamoille River watershed, flowing west to Lake Champlain.
