= Green River Reservoir State Park =

Green River Reservoir State Park may refer to:

- an alternate name for Green River Lake State Park in Kentucky
- Green River Reservoir State Park (Vermont)
