= Eden Mills, Vermont =

- Village
- Location within Vermont Location within the United States
- Coordinates: 44°42′48″N 72°31′48″W
- Country: United States
- State: Vermont
- County: Lamoille
- Town: Eden
- Elevation: 1,161 ft (354 m)
- Time zone: UTC-5 (Eastern (EST))
  - Summer (DST): UTC-4 (EDT)
- ZIP code: 05653
- Area code: 802
- GNIS feature ID: 1457337

Eden Mills is an unincorporated village in the town of Eden, Lamoille County, Vermont, United States. The community is located along Vermont Route 100 9.3 miles (15.0 km) north-northeast of the village of Hyde Park.

Federico García Lorca began Poet in New York and translated Songs while in Eden Mills, visiting his friend Philip Cummings, whose family had rented a summer cottage there in 1929.
