= 251 Club of Vermont =

Civic tourism club in Vermont

- Formation: 1954; 72 years ago
- Headquarters: Randolph, Vermont, United States
- Members: 6000
- Executive Director: Diane Kane
- Key people: Arthur Peach (Founder)
- Website: www.vt251.com

The 251 Club of Vermont, established in 1954, is an organization of Vermont enthusiasts whose objective is to visit the 251 towns and cities in Vermont. In 2022, Essex Junction became a city and now there are 252 cities and towns in Vermont. The club is retaining its name because another town in Vermont may vote to split into a city and town, thus changing the number of cities and towns in Vermont again.

== History ==
The idea of establishing a club to encourage visiting all of Vermont’s 251 towns and cities was first suggested by Dr. Arthur Wallace Peach in At the Sign of the Quill the column he wrote for Vermont Life Magazine. Dr. Peach proposed an informal group that became known as the 251 Club in response to countless readers asking “How can I come to know the real Vermont?”

In the Summer 1954 issue, he invited "the native-born and those born elsewhere but with Vermont in them... to discover the secret and lovely places that main roads do not reveal." "One real way to know Vermont is to visit every town in the state," wrote Peach as he challenged the state’s citizens and seasonal visitors to join his newly established 251 Club of Vermont. A new batch of Vermont maps had to be printed to meet the growing demand and letters from prospective club members rolled in.

In 2021, the village of Essex Junction voted to become a city, breaking from the town of Essex, bringing the total count of towns and cities in Vermont to 252 on July 1, 2022. The club, during a meeting in November, 2021, voted to keep their original name of "251 Club of Vermont".

== Current Club Status ==
Club members are encouraged to travel at their own pace, by car, on foot or any method of their choosing.

There are no membership requirements and just a small fee for joining. There are no rules. There are no records to keep although many members document their travels with photographs, journals, or blogs. The club offers a Vermont Travel Journal as part of its merchandise line for those interested in creating a keepsake of their experiences.

Three times a year, members receive the club newsletter The Wayfarer and are also invited to attend the annual luncheon meeting typically held to coincide with Vermont’s Fall foliage season in late September or early October.

Members also receive a profile page on the club web site where they can track their progress and access member resources such as information and archival material.
