= Lamoille County Courthouse =

- U.S. National Register of Historic Places
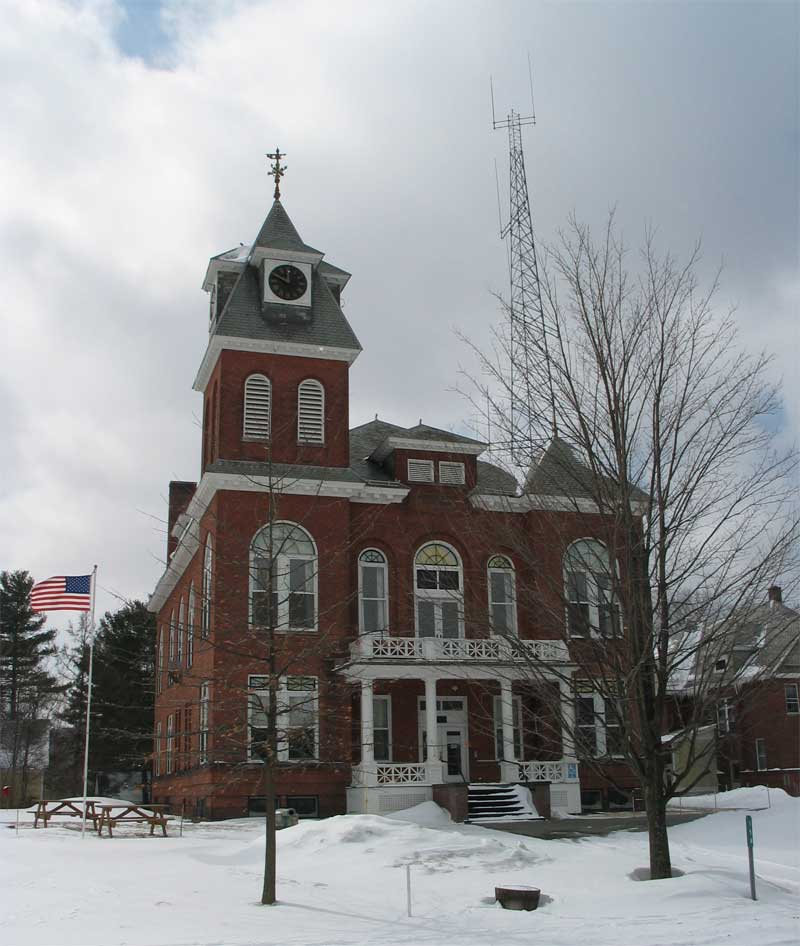

- Location within Vermont Location within the United States
- Interactive map showing the location for Lamoille County Courthouse
- Location: 154 Main St., Hyde Park, Vermont
- Coordinates: 44°35′35″N 72°37′4″W
- Area: Less than 1 acre (0.40 ha)
- Built: 1912
- Built by: Nichols and Parker
- Architect: Austin, Zachary Taylor
- Architectural style: Romanesque, Colonial Revival
- NRHP reference No.: 95001497
- Added to NRHP: January 11, 1996

The Lamoille County Courthouse is located at 154 Main Street in Hyde Park, the shire town of Lamoille County, Vermont. Built in 1912 to a design by Burlington architect Zachary Taylor Austin (1850–1910), it is an example of Romanesque and Colonial Revival architecture. It was listed on the National Register of Historic Places in 1996.

== Description and history ==
The Lamoille County Courthouse is centrally located in the village of Hyde Park, amid a cluster of other government buildings set back from the south side of Main Street. It is an imposing 2 1/2-story brick building, with 3 1/2-story pyramid-roofed tower rising from the front left corner. The main roof is hipped, with dormers projecting from each side, and a low pyramidal roof at the front right corner. The tower has a square belfry stage below the roof, which is pierced by dormered clock faces and topped by a weathervane. The front facade is five bays wide, with a single-story porch extending across the center three bays. It is supported by round columns, and has Union Jack balustrade both on the ground floor, and encircling its roof. Second-floor windows are set in round-arch openings, with the outer and central bays housing doubled windows.

The county's first courthouse was built in Hyde Park in 1836, not long after the county was created by the state legislature, and Hyde Park was chosen as its shire town. That courthouse and 17 other buildings were destroyed by Hyde Park's "Great Fire" in 1910; county records were preserved in fireproof safes. The present building was built in 1911–12 to a design by Burlington architect Zachary Taylor Austin. It is stylistically a distinctive blend of the Colonial Revival and Romanesque Revival, a combination not seen in the state's other county courthouses. The interior, which includes a large courtroom spanning the second floor, has seen little alteration since its construction. It is believed that this building's fire vaults may be those from the 1836 courthouse.

== See also ==
- National Register of Historic Places listings in Lamoille County, Vermont
