= Eden Mills =

Eden Mills may refer to:

- Eden Mills, Ontario, Canada
  - Eden Mills Writers' Festival
- Eden Mills, Vermont, United States
