= List of municipalities in Vermont =

Municipalities of Vermont
- Category: Municipality
- Location: State of Vermont
- Found in: County
- Created: 1735 (Westminster)
- Number: 247
- Populations: 70 (Victory) – 44,743 (Burlington)
- Areas: 1.5 square miles (3.9 km^{2}) (Winooski) – 73.8 square miles (191 km^{2}) (Chittenden)
- Government: Council–manager; Town meeting; Mayor–council; Select Board
- Subdivisions: Village; Neighborhood

The U.S. state of Vermont is divided into 247 municipalities, including 237 towns and 10 cities. Vermont also has nine unincorporated areas, split between five unincorporated towns and four gores. As of 2024, Vermont has 30 incorporated villages, which are municipal governments operating within a town and providing additional services.

== Definitions ==
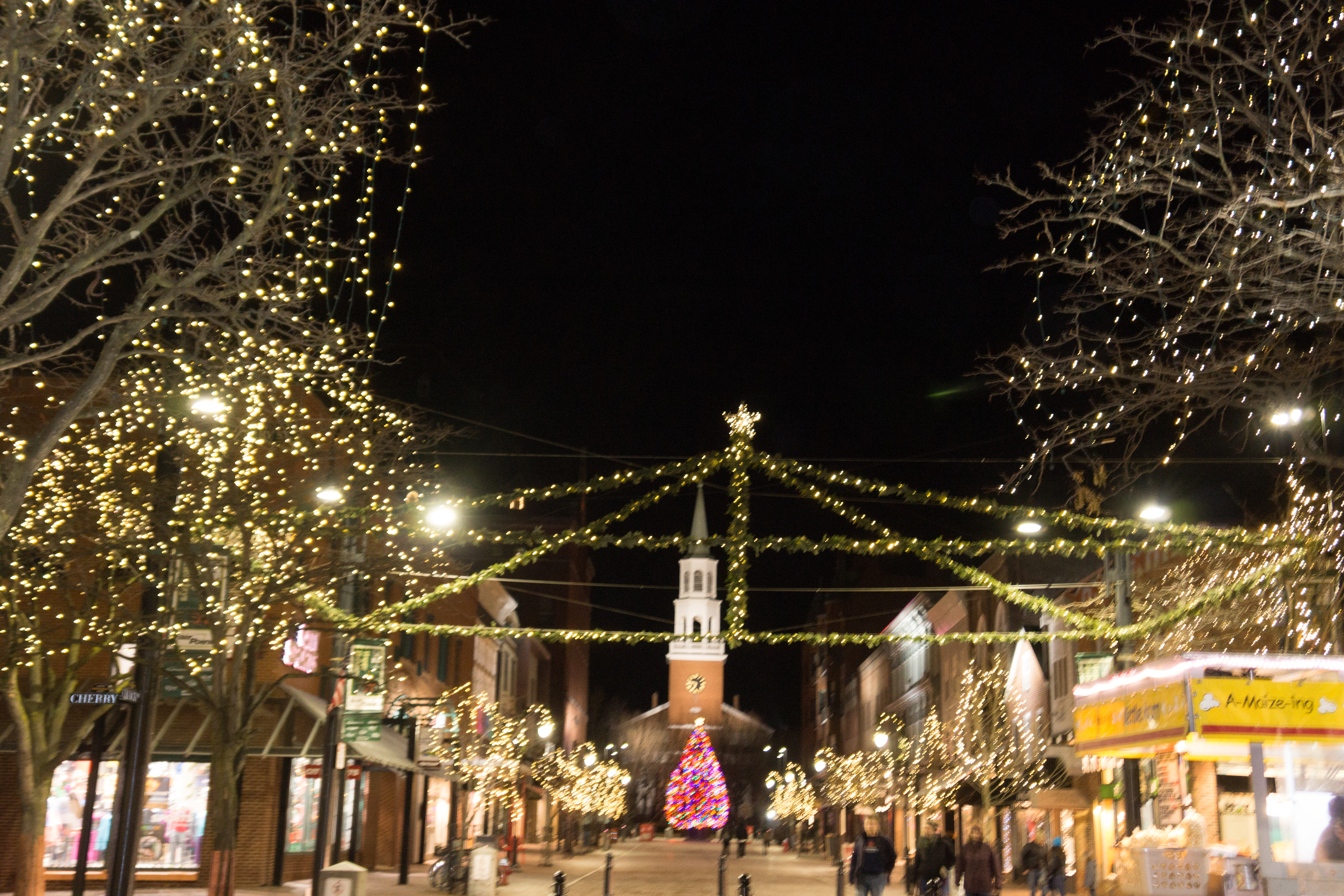
Burlington, Vermont's largest city

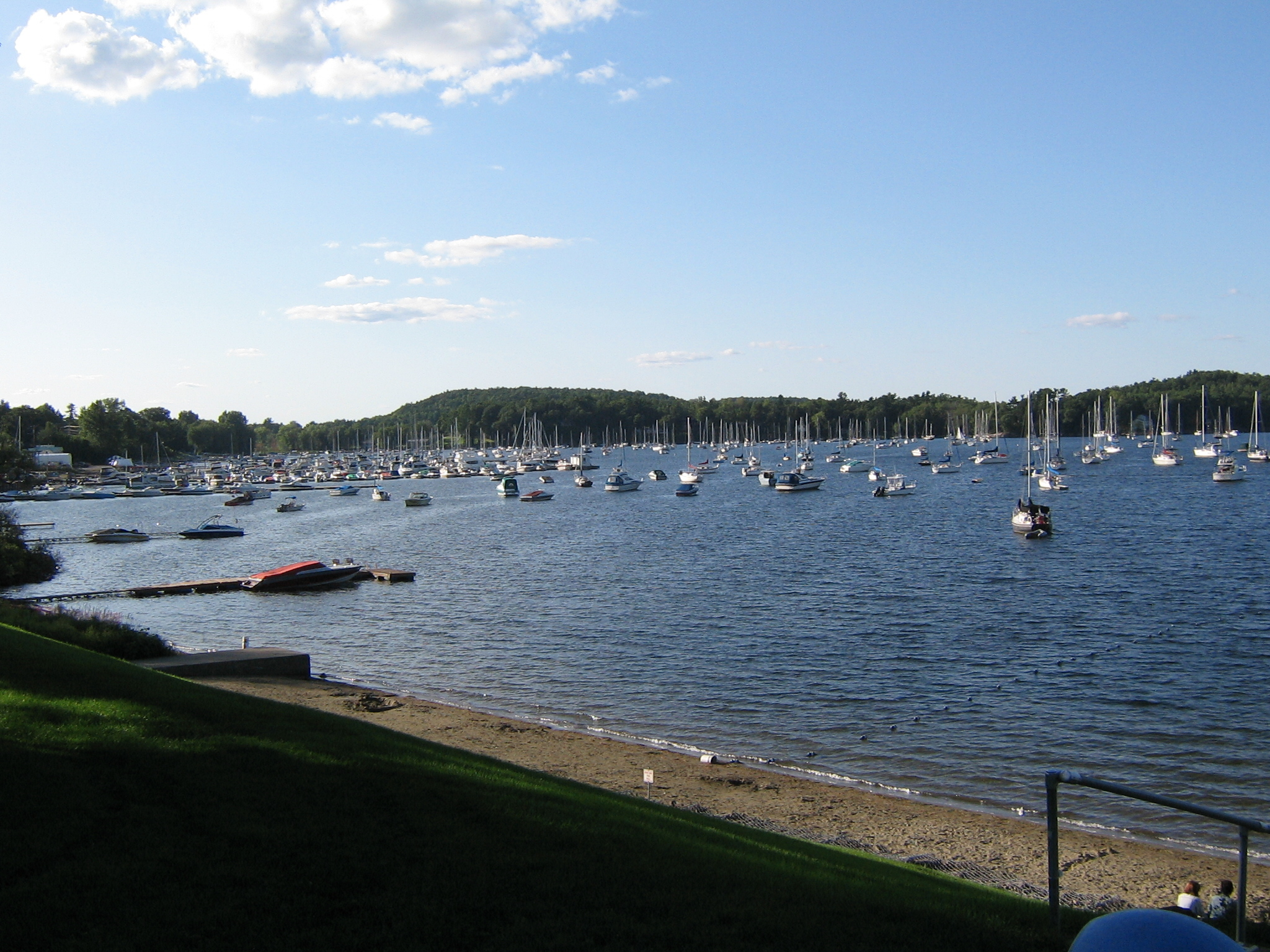
Colchester, Vermont's third largest municipality

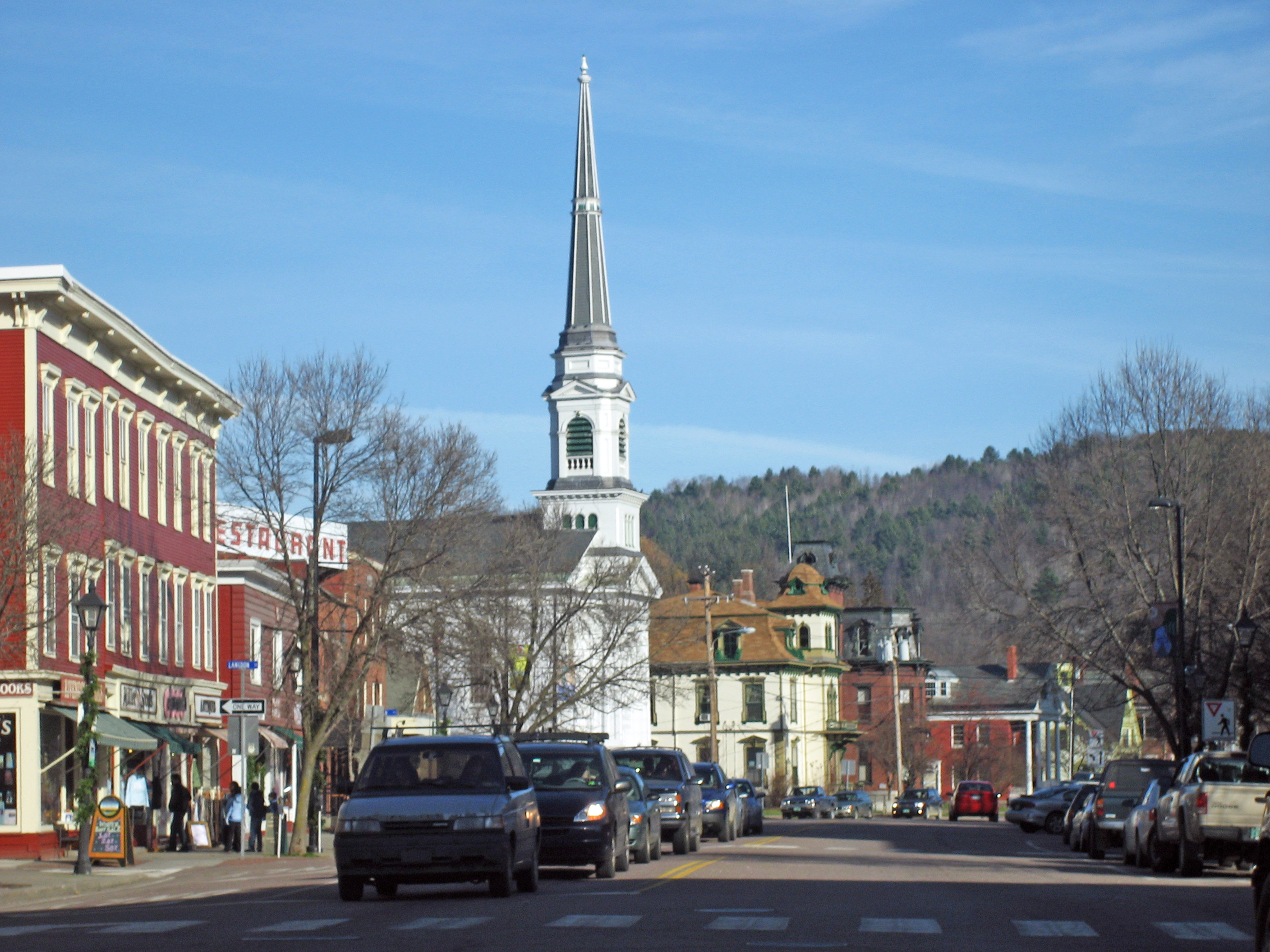
The downtown area of Montpelier, Vermont's capital city

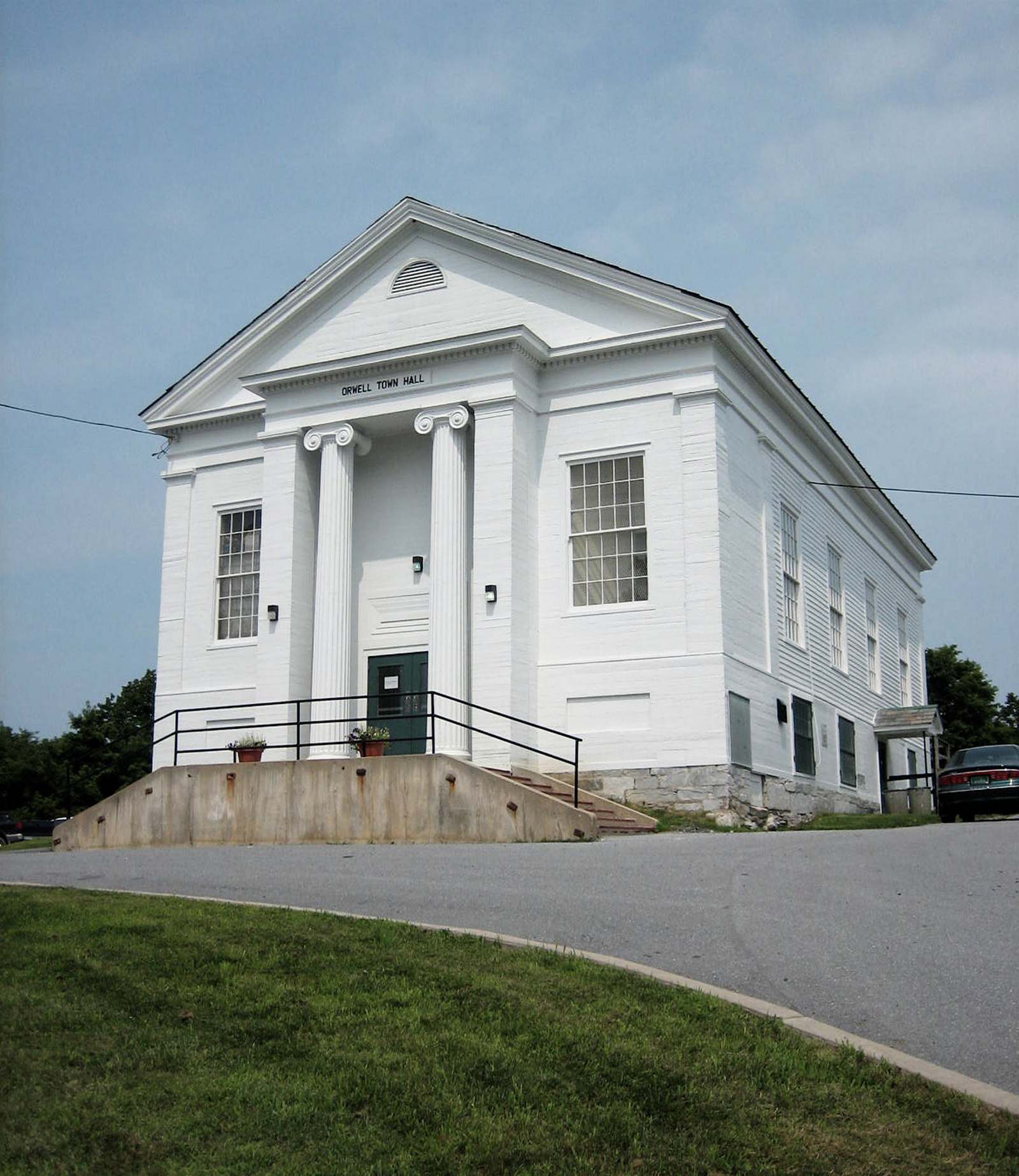
Orwell Town Hall

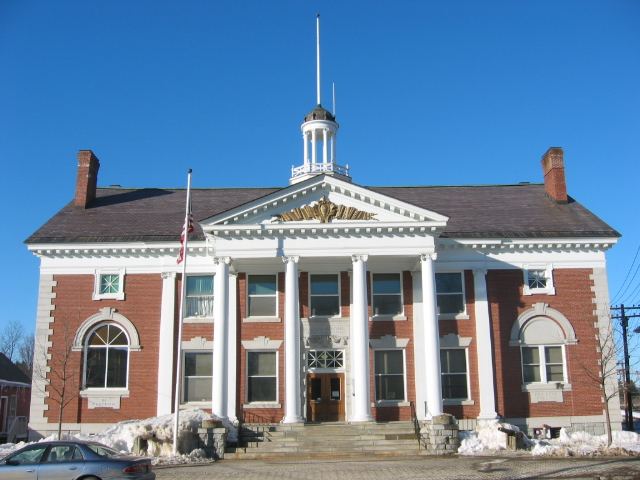
Stowe Town Hall

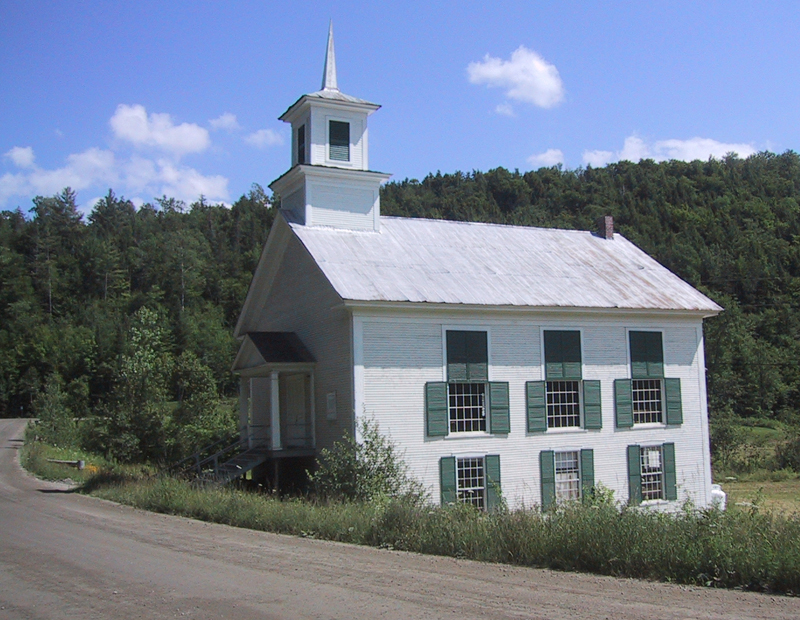
Calais Town Hall

Cities in Vermont are municipalities with the city form of government. Vermont has ten cities with a combined area of 80.2 sq mi (208 km^{2}), or 0.8% of the state's total area.

According to the 2020 census, 119,299 people, or 18.54% of the state's population, resided in Vermont's cities (excluding Essex Junction, which incorporated in 2022). Six of Vermont's 14 counties have at least one city within their borders. Five cities serve as the county seats for their respective counties.

Towns in Vermont are municipalities that typically incorporate the town meeting format into their government

In some cases, a town and city have the same name, such as Barre City which is almost entirely surrounded by the separate municipality of Barre Town.

Municipalities
Municipality	Type	County	Population (2020)	Total area	Year Established
Burlington	City	Chittenden (seat)	44,743	15.49 sq mi (40.1 km^{2})	1785
South Burlington	City	Chittenden	20,292	29.58 sq mi (76.6 km^{2})	1865
Colchester	Town	Chittenden	17,524	58.57 sq mi (151.7 km^{2})	1763
Rutland	City	Rutland (seat)	15,807	7.68 sq mi (19.9 km^{2})	1761
Bennington	Town	Bennington (seat)	15,333	42.50 sq mi (110.1 km^{2})	1749
Brattleboro	Town	Windham	12,184	32.41 sq mi (83.9 km^{2})	1753
Essex	Town	Chittenden	11,540	39.32 sq mi (101.8 km^{2})	1763
Milton	Town	Chittenden	10,723	60.89 sq mi (157.7 km^{2})	1763
Hartford	Town	Windsor	10,686	45.88 sq mi (118.8 km^{2})	1761
Essex Junction	City	Chittenden	10,590	4.74 sq mi (12.3 km^{2})	2022
Williston	Town	Chittenden	10,103	30.58 sq mi (79.2 km^{2})	1763
Middlebury	Town	Addison (seat)	9,152	39.22 sq mi (101.6 km^{2})	1761
Springfield	Town	Windsor	9,062	49.44 sq mi (128.0 km^{2})	1761
Barre	City	Washington	8,491	3.98 sq mi (10.3 km^{2})	1895
Montpelier	City (capital)	Washington (seat)	8,074	10.25 sq mi (26.5 km^{2})	1781
Winooski	City	Chittenden	7,997	1.51 sq mi (3.9 km^{2})	1922
Barre	Town	Washington	7,923	30.72 sq mi (79.6 km^{2})	1780
Shelburne	Town	Chittenden	7,717	45.07 sq mi (116.7 km^{2})	1763
St. Johnsbury	Town	Caledonia (seat)	7,364	36.74 sq mi (95.2 km^{2})	1786
St. Albans	Town	Franklin	6,988	60.53 sq mi (156.8 km^{2})	1763
St. Albans	City	Franklin (seat)	6,887	2.03 sq mi (5.3 km^{2})	1902
Swanton	Town	Franklin	6,701	61.67 sq mi (159.7 km^{2})	1763
Northfield	Town	Washington	5,918	43.63 sq mi (113.0 km^{2})	1781
Lyndon	Town	Caledonia	5,491	39.82 sq mi (103.1 km^{2})	1780
Morristown	Town	Lamoille	5,434	51.68 sq mi (133.9 km^{2})	1781
Waterbury	Town	Washington	5,331	49.76 sq mi (128.9 km^{2})	
Stowe	Town	Lamoille	5,223	72.76 sq mi (188.4 km^{2})	
Jericho	Town	Chittenden	5,104	35.55 sq mi (92.1 km^{2})	
Fairfax	Town	Franklin	5,014	40.43 sq mi (104.7 km^{2})	
Georgia	Town	Franklin	4,845	45.22 sq mi (117.1 km^{2})	
Rockingham	Town	Windham	4,832	42.23 sq mi (109.4 km^{2})	
Randolph	Town	Orange	4,774	48.20 sq mi (124.8 km^{2})	
Hinesburg	Town	Chittenden	4,698	39.83 sq mi (103.2 km^{2})	
Derby	Town	Orleans	4,579	57.60 sq mi (149.2 km^{2})	
Manchester	Town	Bennington (seat)	4,484	42.25 sq mi (109.4 km^{2})	
Castleton	Town	Rutland	4,458	42.35 sq mi (109.7 km^{2})	
Newport	City	Orleans (seat)	4,455	7.63 sq mi (19.8 km^{2})	1917
Richmond	Town	Chittenden	4,167	32.75 sq mi (84.8 km^{2})	
Brandon	Town	Rutland	4,129	40.14 sq mi (104.0 km^{2})	
Rutland	Town	Rutland	3,924	19.34 sq mi (50.1 km^{2})	
Cambridge	Town	Lamoille	3,839	63.69 sq mi (165.0 km^{2})	
Charlotte	Town	Chittenden	3,783	50.36 sq mi (130.4 km^{2})	
Bristol	Town	Addison	3,782	42.18 sq mi (109.2 km^{2})	
Norwich	Town	Windsor	3,612	44.68 sq mi (115.7 km^{2})	
Shaftsbury	Town	Bennington	3,598	43.18 sq mi (111.8 km^{2})	
Windsor	Town	Windsor	3,559	19.75 sq mi (51.2 km^{2})	
Williamstown	Town	Orange	3,515	40.45 sq mi (104.8 km^{2})	
Johnson	Town	Lamoille	3,491	45.09 sq mi (116.8 km^{2})	
Highgate	Town	Franklin	3,472	59.74 sq mi (154.7 km^{2})	
Hartland	Town	Windsor	3,446	45.20 sq mi (117.1 km^{2})	
Pownal	Town	Bennington	3,258	46.73 sq mi (121.0 km^{2})	
Underhill	Town	Chittenden	3,129	51.40 sq mi (133.1 km^{2})	
Hyde Park	Town	Lamoille (seat)	3,020	38.93 sq mi (100.8 km^{2})	
Poultney	Town	Rutland	3,020	43.96 sq mi (113.9 km^{2})	
Westminster	Town	Windham	3,016	46.09 sq mi (119.4 km^{2})	1735
Chester	Town	Windsor	3,005	55.94 sq mi (144.9 km^{2})	
Woodstock	Town	Windsor (seat)	3,005	44.64 sq mi (115.6 km^{2})	
Hardwick	Town	Caledonia	2,920	39.02 sq mi (101.1 km^{2})	
Barton	Town	Orleans	2,872	44.88 sq mi (116.2 km^{2})	
Pittsford	Town	Rutland	2,862	43.58 sq mi (112.9 km^{2})	
Berlin	Town	Washington	2,849	36.94 sq mi (95.7 km^{2})	
Weathersfield	Town	Windsor	2,842	44.20 sq mi (114.5 km^{2})	
Enosburgh	Town	Franklin	2,810	48.72 sq mi (126.2 km^{2})	
Bradford	Town	Orange	2,790	29.84 sq mi (77.3 km^{2})	
Thetford	Town	Orange	2,775	44.43 sq mi (115.1 km^{2})	
Royalton	Town	Windsor	2,750	40.93 sq mi (106.0 km^{2})	
Fair Haven	Town	Rutland	2,736	18.15 sq mi (47.0 km^{2})	
Ferrisburgh	Town	Addison	2,646	61.16 sq mi (158.4 km^{2})	
Putney	Town	Windham	2,617	26.83 sq mi (69.5 km^{2})	
East Montpelier	Town	Washington	2,598	32.12 sq mi (83.2 km^{2})	
Vergennes	City	Addison	2,553	2.51 sq mi (6.5 km^{2})	1788
Arlington	Town	Bennington	2,457	42.43 sq mi (109.9 km^{2})	
Clarendon	Town	Rutland	2,412	31.52 sq mi (81.6 km^{2})	
Richford	Town	Franklin	2,346	43.29 sq mi (112.1 km^{2})	
Danville	Town	Caledonia	2,335	61.13 sq mi (158.3 km^{2})	
Newbury	Town	Orange	2,293	64.81 sq mi (167.9 km^{2})	
Wilmington	Town	Windham	2,255	41.71 sq mi (108.0 km^{2})	
West Rutland	Town	Rutland	2,214	17.98 sq mi (46.6 km^{2})	
Vernon	Town	Windham	2,192	20.06 sq mi (52.0 km^{2})	
Ludlow	Town	Windsor	2,172	35.70 sq mi (92.5 km^{2})	
Sheldon	Town	Franklin	2,136	39.54 sq mi (102.4 km^{2})	
Dorset	Town	Bennington	2,133	47.88 sq mi (124.0 km^{2})	
Wallingford	Town	Rutland	2,129	43.44 sq mi (112.5 km^{2})	
Guilford	Town	Windham	2,120	39.96 sq mi (103.5 km^{2})	
Alburgh	Town	Grand Isle	2,106	48.82 sq mi (126.4 km^{2})	
Grand Isle	Town	Grand Isle	2,086	35.13 sq mi (91.0 km^{2})	
Monkton	Town	Addison	2,079	36.24 sq mi (93.9 km^{2})	
Westford	Town	Chittenden	2,062	39.29 sq mi (101.8 km^{2})	
Fairfield	Town	Franklin	2,044	68.50 sq mi (177.4 km^{2})	
Warren	Town	Washington	1,977	39.98 sq mi (103.5 km^{2})	
Bethel	Town	Windsor	1,942	45.44 sq mi (117.7 km^{2})	
Huntington	Town	Chittenden	1,934	38.04 sq mi (98.5 km^{2})	
Londonderry	Town	Windham	1,919	35.90 sq mi (93.0 km^{2})	
Dummerston	Town	Windham	1,865	30.83 sq mi (79.8 km^{2})	
Waitsfield	Town	Washington	1,844	26.90 sq mi (69.7 km^{2})	
Dover	Town	Windham	1,798	35.33 sq mi (91.5 km^{2})	
Middlesex	Town	Washington	1,779	39.87 sq mi (103.3 km^{2})	
Proctor	Town	Rutland	1,763	7.60 sq mi (19.7 km^{2})	
Starksboro	Town	Addison	1,756	45.87 sq mi (118.8 km^{2})	
Moretown	Town	Washington	1,753	40.21 sq mi (104.1 km^{2})	
Marlboro	Town	Windham	1,722	40.65 sq mi (105.3 km^{2})	
Troy	Town	Orleans	1,722	36.05 sq mi (93.4 km^{2})	
New Haven	Town	Addison	1,683	41.54 sq mi (107.6 km^{2})	
South Hero	Town	Grand Isle	1,674	47.49 sq mi (123.0 km^{2})	
Wolcott	Town	Lamoille	1,670	39.13 sq mi (101.3 km^{2})	
Barnet	Town	Caledonia	1,663	43.58 sq mi (112.9 km^{2})	
Calais	Town	Washington	1,661	38.56 sq mi (99.9 km^{2})	
Burke	Town	Caledonia	1,651	34.03 sq mi (88.1 km^{2})	
Newfane	Town	Windham (seat)	1,645	40.52 sq mi (104.9 km^{2})	
Marshfield	Town	Washington	1,583	43.43 sq mi (112.5 km^{2})	
Sharon	Town	Windsor	1,560	40.16 sq mi (104.0 km^{2})	
Berkshire	Town	Franklin	1,547	42.23 sq mi (109.4 km^{2})	
Newport	Town	Orleans	1,526	43.52 sq mi (112.7 km^{2})	1802
Corinth	Town	Orange	1,455	48.55 sq mi (125.7 km^{2})	
Cabot	Town	Washington	1,443	38.53 sq mi (99.8 km^{2})	
Pawlet	Town	Rutland	1,424	42.90 sq mi (111.1 km^{2})	
Duxbury	Town	Washington	1,413	43.10 sq mi (111.6 km^{2})	
Killington	Town	Rutland	1,407	46.86 sq mi (121.4 km^{2})	
Cavendish	Town	Windsor	1,392	39.71 sq mi (102.8 km^{2})	
Mount Holly	Town	Rutland	1,385	49.57 sq mi (128.4 km^{2})	
Addison	Town	Addison	1,365	48.93 sq mi (126.7 km^{2})	
Fayston	Town	Washington	1,364	36.45 sq mi (94.4 km^{2})	
Franklin	Town	Franklin	1,363	40.76 sq mi (105.6 km^{2})	
Fletcher	Town	Franklin	1,346	38.00 sq mi (98.4 km^{2})	
West Windsor	Town	Windsor	1,344	24.73 sq mi (64.1 km^{2})	
Whitingham	Town	Windham	1,344	38.87 sq mi (100.7 km^{2})	
Craftsbury	Town	Orleans	1,343	39.76 sq mi (103.0 km^{2})	
Eden	Town	Lamoille	1,338	64.29 sq mi (166.5 km^{2})	
Tunbridge	Town	Orange	1,337	44.72 sq mi (115.8 km^{2})	
Lincoln	Town	Addison	1,323	44.60 sq mi (115.5 km^{2})	
Bolton	Town	Chittenden	1,301	42.53 sq mi (110.2 km^{2})	
Townshend	Town	Windham	1,291	42.67 sq mi (110.5 km^{2})	
Danby	Town	Rutland	1,284	41.54 sq mi (107.6 km^{2})	
Bakersfield	Town	Franklin	1,273	44.63 sq mi (115.6 km^{2})	
Waterford	Town	Caledonia	1,268	39.74 sq mi (102.9 km^{2})	
Shoreham	Town	Addison	1,260	46.39 sq mi (120.1 km^{2})	
Lunenburg	Town	Essex	1,246	45.78 sq mi (118.6 km^{2})	
Brookfield	Town	Orange	1,244	41.15 sq mi (106.6 km^{2})	
Orwell	Town	Addison	1,239	49.67 sq mi (128.6 km^{2})	
Chittenden	Town	Rutland	1,237	73.80 sq mi (191.1 km^{2})	
Plainfield	Town	Washington	1,236	21.05 sq mi (54.5 km^{2})	
Chelsea	Town	Orange (seat)	1,233	39.94 sq mi (103.4 km^{2})	
Irasburg	Town	Orleans	1,233	40.58 sq mi (105.1 km^{2})	
Bridport	Town	Addison	1,225	46.31 sq mi (119.9 km^{2})	
Salisbury	Town	Addison	1,221	30.02 sq mi (77.8 km^{2})	
Wells	Town	Rutland	1,214	22.99 sq mi (59.5 km^{2})	
Braintree	Town	Orange	1,207	38.39 sq mi (99.4 km^{2})	
Cornwall	Town	Addison	1,207	28.61 sq mi (74.1 km^{2})	
Topsham	Town	Orange	1,199	48.99 sq mi (126.9 km^{2})	
Montgomery	Town	Franklin	1,184	56.70 sq mi (146.9 km^{2})	
Winhall	Town	Bennington	1,182	44.02 sq mi (114.0 km^{2})	
Ryegate	Town	Caledonia	1,165	36.77 sq mi (95.2 km^{2})	
Brighton	Town	Essex	1,157	53.34 sq mi (138.1 km^{2})	
Mendon	Town	Rutland	1,149	38.09 sq mi (98.7 km^{2})	
Concord	Town	Essex	1,141	53.52 sq mi (138.6 km^{2})	
Glover	Town	Orleans	1,114	38.61 sq mi (100.0 km^{2})	
Coventry	Town	Orleans	1,100	27.67 sq mi (71.7 km^{2})	
Rochester	Town	Windsor	1,099	57.38 sq mi (148.6 km^{2})	
Shrewsbury	Town	Rutland	1,096	50.17 sq mi (129.9 km^{2})	
Strafford	Town	Orange	1,094	44.30 sq mi (114.7 km^{2})	
Sunderland	Town	Bennington	1,056	45.65 sq mi (118.2 km^{2})	
Orange	Town	Orange	1,048	39.01 sq mi (101.0 km^{2})	
Brownington	Town	Orleans	1,042	28.45 sq mi (73.7 km^{2})	
Washington	Town	Orange	1,032	38.87 sq mi (100.7 km^{2})	
Charleston	Town	Orleans	1,021	38.82 sq mi (100.5 km^{2})	
Jamaica	Town	Windham	1,005	49.46 sq mi (128.1 km^{2})	
Barnard	Town	Windsor	992	48.89 sq mi (126.6 km^{2})	
Leicester	Town	Addison	990	21.78 sq mi (56.4 km^{2})	
Fairlee	Town	Orange	988	21.25 sq mi (55.0 km^{2})	
Groton	Town	Caledonia	984	54.96 sq mi (142.3 km^{2})	
Albany	Town	Orleans	976	38.67 sq mi (100.2 km^{2})	
Benson	Town	Rutland	974	45.52 sq mi (117.9 km^{2})	
Worcester	Town	Washington	964	38.83 sq mi (100.6 km^{2})	
Walden	Town	Caledonia	956	38.94 sq mi (100.9 km^{2})	
North Hero	Town	Grand Isle (seat)	939	46.57 sq mi (120.6 km^{2})	
Woodbury	Town	Washington	928	39.10 sq mi (101.3 km^{2})	
Pomfret	Town	Windsor	916	39.47 sq mi (102.2 km^{2})	
Sutton	Town	Caledonia	913	38.37 sq mi (99.4 km^{2})	
Bridgewater	Town	Windsor	903	49.54 sq mi (128.3 km^{2})	
Canaan	Town	Essex	896	33.43 sq mi (86.6 km^{2})	
Lowell	Town	Orleans	887	56.08 sq mi (145.2 km^{2})	
Elmore	Town	Lamoille	886	39.58 sq mi (102.5 km^{2})	
Wardsboro	Town	Windham	869	29.23 sq mi (75.7 km^{2})	
Stamford	Town	Bennington	861	39.62 sq mi (102.6 km^{2})	
Weybridge	Town	Addison	814	17.61 sq mi (45.6 km^{2})	
Greensboro	Town	Orleans	811	39.39 sq mi (102.0 km^{2})	
Middletown Springs	Town	Rutland	794	22.32 sq mi (57.8 km^{2})	
St. George	Town	Chittenden	794	3.56 sq mi (9.2 km^{2})	
Halifax	Town	Windham	771	39.81 sq mi (103.1 km^{2})	
Wheelock	Town	Caledonia	759	39.82 sq mi (103.1 km^{2})	
Ripton	Town	Addison	739	49.86 sq mi (129.1 km^{2})	
Hubbardton	Town	Rutland	735	28.84 sq mi (74.7 km^{2})	
Stockbridge	Town	Windsor	718	46.17 sq mi (119.6 km^{2})	
Peacham	Town	Caledonia	715	47.68 sq mi (123.5 km^{2})	
Readsboro	Town	Bennington	702	36.48 sq mi (94.5 km^{2})	
Rupert	Town	Bennington	698	44.60 sq mi (115.5 km^{2})	
Reading	Town	Windsor	687	41.65 sq mi (107.9 km^{2})	
Waterville	Town	Lamoille	686	16.40 sq mi (42.5 km^{2})	
Sheffield	Town	Caledonia	682	32.77 sq mi (84.9 km^{2})	
Roxbury	Town	Washington	678	42.03 sq mi (108.9 km^{2})	
Vershire	Town	Orange	672	36.54 sq mi (94.6 km^{2})	
Panton	Town	Addison	646	22.06 sq mi (57.1 km^{2})	
Grafton	Town	Windham	645	38.37 sq mi (99.4 km^{2})	
Plymouth	Town	Windsor	641	48.68 sq mi (126.1 km^{2})	
Morgan	Town	Orleans	638	33.82 sq mi (87.6 km^{2})	
Holland	Town	Orleans	632	38.08 sq mi (98.6 km^{2})	
Weston	Town	Windsor	623	35.17 sq mi (91.1 km^{2})	
West Fairlee	Town	Orange	621	22.82 sq mi (59.1 km^{2})	
Newark	Town	Caledonia	584	37.21 sq mi (96.4 km^{2})	
Kirby	Town	Caledonia	575	24.42 sq mi (63.2 km^{2})	
Andover	Town	Windsor	568	28.78 sq mi (74.5 km^{2})	
Tinmouth	Town	Rutland	553	28.72 sq mi (74.4 km^{2})	
Jay	Town	Orleans	551	33.97 sq mi (88.0 km^{2})	
Sudbury	Town	Rutland	545	22.22 sq mi (57.5 km^{2})	
Brookline	Town	Windham	540	12.90 sq mi (33.4 km^{2})	
Westfield	Town	Orleans	534	40.20 sq mi (104.1 km^{2})	
Peru	Town	Bennington	531	37.34 sq mi (96.7 km^{2})	
Pittsfield	Town	Rutland	504	20.46 sq mi (53.0 km^{2})	
Isle La Motte	Town	Grand Isle	488	16.66 sq mi (43.1 km^{2})	
Windham	Town	Windham	449	26.10 sq mi (67.6 km^{2})	
Waltham	Town	Addison	446	9.06 sq mi (23.5 km^{2})	
Stratton	Town	Windham	440	46.89 sq mi (121.4 km^{2})	
Whiting	Town	Addison	405	13.70 sq mi (35.5 km^{2})	
Sandgate	Town	Bennington	387	42.20 sq mi (109.3 km^{2})	
Athens	Town	Windham	380	13.12 sq mi (34.0 km^{2})	
Ira	Town	Rutland	368	22.78 sq mi (59.0 km^{2})	
Hancock	Town	Addison	359	38.13 sq mi (98.8 km^{2})	
Belvidere	Town	Lamoille	358	32.14 sq mi (83.2 km^{2})	
Westmore	Town	Orleans	357	37.39 sq mi (96.8 km^{2})	
Woodford	Town	Bennington	355	47.59 sq mi (123.3 km^{2})	
Granville	Town	Addison	301	51.51 sq mi (133.4 km^{2})	
East Haven	Town	Essex	270	37.41 sq mi (96.9 km^{2})	
Guildhall	Town	Essex (seat)	262	33.09 sq mi (85.7 km^{2})	
West Haven	Town	Rutland	239	28.47 sq mi (73.7 km^{2})	
Baltimore	Town	Windsor	229	4.66 sq mi (12.1 km^{2})	
Bloomfield	Town	Essex	217	40.54 sq mi (105.0 km^{2})	
Maidstone	Town	Essex	211	32.30 sq mi (83.7 km^{2})	
Mount Tabor	Town	Rutland	210	43.81 sq mi (113.5 km^{2})	
Stannard	Town	Caledonia	208	12.51 sq mi (32.4 km^{2})	
Landgrove	Town	Bennington	177	9.17 sq mi (23.8 km^{2})	
Goshen	Town	Addison	172	20.81 sq mi (53.9 km^{2})	
Norton	Town	Essex	153	39.62 sq mi (102.6 km^{2})	
Searsburg	Town	Bennington	126	21.57 sq mi (55.9 km^{2})	
Brunswick	Town	Essex	88	26.00 sq mi (67.3 km^{2})	
Lemington	Town	Essex	87	35.52 sq mi (92.0 km^{2})	
Granby	Town	Essex	81	39.13 sq mi (101.3 km^{2})	
Victory	Town	Essex	70	43.00 sq mi (111.4 km^{2})	

== Unincorporated areas ==
Unincorporated towns in Vermont are towns that had their charters revoked by the Vermont legislature or never formally organized due to lack of residents. Towns in name only, their affairs are managed by a state-appointed supervisor and not by a local government.

Gores in Vermont are seen as an unincorporated area of a county that is not part of any town, has limited self-government, and may be unpopulated. Vermont has four current gores.

Area	Type	County	2020 Population	Area in Square Miles (km^{2})
Buels Gore	Gore	Chittenden	29	5.0 sq mi (13.1 km^{2})
Averill	Unincorporated Town	Essex	21	38.07 sq mi (98.6 km^{2})
Ferdinand	Unincorporated Town	Essex	16	52.81 sq mi (136.8 km^{2})
Glastenbury	Unincorporated Town	Bennington	9	44.45 sq mi (115.1 km^{2})
Somerset	Unincorporated Town	Windham	6	28.13 sq mi (72.9 km^{2})
Lewis	Unincorporated Town	Essex	2	39.66 sq mi (102.7 km^{2})
Warren's Gore	Gore	Essex	2	11.6 sq mi (30.0 km^{2})
Averys Gore	Gore	Essex	0	17.6 sq mi (45.6 km^{2})
Warner's Grant	Gore	Essex	0	3.2 sq mi (8.2 km^{2})

== Villages ==
In the U.S. state of Vermont, villages are named communities located within the boundaries of a town. Villages may be incorporated or unincorporated.

An incorporated village is a defined area within a town that was either granted a village charter by a special act of the legislature, or organized under the general legislation. A village which has been incorporated is a clearly defined municipality and provides a variety of municipal services, such as potable water, sewage, police and fire services, garbage collection, street lighting and maintenance, management of cemeteries, and building code enforcement. Other municipal services not provided by the village are provided by the parent town. Incorporated villages in Vermont are administratively similar to villages in New York. Vermont is the only state in New England that has incorporated villages.

As of 2024, there are 30 incorporated villages with active governments in Vermont. Historically, there were more but most have since disincorporated, while others were chartered as cities. Below is a list of incorporated villages that have existed, ordered by date of incorporation.

Current Villages
Village	Parent town	Date incorporated
Bellows Falls	Rockingham	1833
Woodstock	Woodstock	1836
North Bennington	Bennington	1866
Ludlow	Ludlow	1866
Barton	Barton	1874
North Troy	Troy	1876
Orleans	Barton	1878
Enosburg Falls	Enosburgh	1886
Wells River	Newbury	1888
Swanton	Swanton	1888
Morrisville	Morristown	1890
Johnson	Johnson	1894
Hyde Park	Hyde Park	1895
Jeffersonville	Cambridge	1896
Newbury	Newbury	1896/1904
Derby Center	Derby	1898
Derby Line	Derby	1898
Manchester	Manchester	1900
Old Bennington	Bennington	1900
West Burke	Burke	1902
Cambridge	Cambridge	1904
Jacksonville	Whitingham	1904
Poultney	Poultney	1904
Saxtons River	Rockingham	1905
Newfane	Newfane	1906
Westminster	Westminster	1907
Marshfield	Marshfield	1910
Albany	Albany	1915
Alburgh	Alburgh	1916
Jericho	Jericho	1933
Westbury	Colchester	2023

Former Villages
Village	Parent town	Date incorporated	Date disincorporated
Middlebury	Middlebury	1816/1832	1955/1966
Montpelier	Montpelier	1818	chartered as city in 1894
Brattleboro	Brattleboro	1832	1927
Windsor	Windsor	1832	1967
Springfield Center	Springfield	1835	
Rutland	Rutland	1847	chartered as city in 1892
Bennington	Bennington	1849	1967/1970
St. Johnsbury	St. Johnsbury	1852	1965
Northfield	Northfield	1855	2014
Wilmington	Wilmington	1855	1959/1965
St. Albans	St. Albans	1859	chartered as city in 1896
Newport	Newport	1862	chartered as city in 1917
Fair Haven	Fair Haven	1865	1955
Cabot	Cabot	1866	2010
Winooski	Colchester	1866	chartered as city in 1921
Springfield	Springfield	1866	1947
Plainfield	Plainfield	1867	1984
Richford	Richford	1878	1998
Randolph	Randolph	1880	1984
Lyndonville	Lyndon	1880	2023
Waterbury	Waterbury	1882	2018
Proctor	Proctor	1884	1967
Barre	Barre	1886	chartered as city in 1894
Bristol	Bristol	1886/1903	1994
Brandon	Brandon	1888	
Bradford	Bradford	1890	2004
Hardwick	Hardwick	1890	1988
Readsboro	Readsboro	1892	1986
Essex Junction	Essex	1892	chartered as city in 2022
West Derby	Derby	1894	1917
Stowe	Stowe	1895	1996
Lyndon Center	Lyndon	1896	
Lyndon Corner	Lyndon	1899/1917	1951
Milton	Milton	1900	2003
Richmond	Richmond	1903	1989
Chester	Chester	1900/1906	1967
Concord	Concord	1904	1969
Glover	Glover	1905	1973
Groton	Groton	1907	inactive since 1965
Proctorsville	Cavendish	1907	1987
South Royalton	Royalton	1908	
Newport Center	Newport	1908	1931
South Ryegate	Ryegate	1908	
West Glover	Glover	1910	1973
Pittsford	Pittsford	1912	1988
Townshend	Townshend	1916	inactive since 1961
West Barnet	Barnet	1922	1961
North Westminster	Westminster	1925	2010
Perkinsville	Weathersfield	1928	2020
Essex Center	Essex	1949	1977
Binghamville	Fletcher		

== See also ==
- List of counties in Vermont
- List of census-designated places in Vermont
- List of gores in Vermont
- Vermont 251 Club – an organization whose members try to visit every town in Vermont.
