= Johnson Woolen Mills =

American manufacturer of athletic clothing and women's workout clothes

- Founded: 1842; 184 years ago in Johnson, Vermont, U.S.
- Founder: Andrew Dow
- Headquarters: 51 Lower Main St E Johnson, Vermont, U.S.
- Products: Woolen outerwear; Flannel clothing
- Number of employees: 21
- Website: www.johnsonwoolenmills.com

Johnson Woolen Mills is an American manufacturer of woolen outer wear and other wool and flannel clothing located in Johnson, Vermont.

== Ownership ==
The company began in 1842 when local farmers brought their own wool in to the local mill above the Gihon River, owned by Andrew Dow, to have it woven into cloth. The business was originally a fabric manufacturer and began to make its own clothing in the early 20th century.

Dow partnered with and eventually sold out to Isaac Pearl who ran it as the I. L. Pearl Company. He was joined by D.A. Barrows in 1905 who soon became the company's owner. The company remained in the Barrows family, handed down for three generations, until the final Barrows owner Stacey Barrows Manosh purchased it from her father in 1998. After Manosh took over, the company started more actively courting international markets and attending larger retailer conventions. Eventually the Japanese market turned into 30 percent of all of JWM's wholesale purchases.

The business was purchased by Gene Richards in early 2023 and has an ownership structure including his wife Julie, his two sons and their partners and his business associate Erin Desautels. Richards implemented changes including an inventory and website overhaul, as well as community-building such as hanging Christmas lights outside the store and installation of a deer weighing station.

== Products ==
The mill itself closed in 1960 but clothing is still made on-site, having a reputation of being "sturdy clothing good for many winters." Johnson Woolen Mills creates clothing useful for hunting such as hunting coats and pants made of heavy fabric in reds and greens, with many pockets. They call their hunting pants the "Best Wearing Trousers in America." In 2023 they created a Northwoods X 1842 collection in partnership with local hunting enthusiasts. They also sell wool and flannel by the yard.

== See also ==
- Mackinaw jacket
