= Eden, Vermont =

- Town
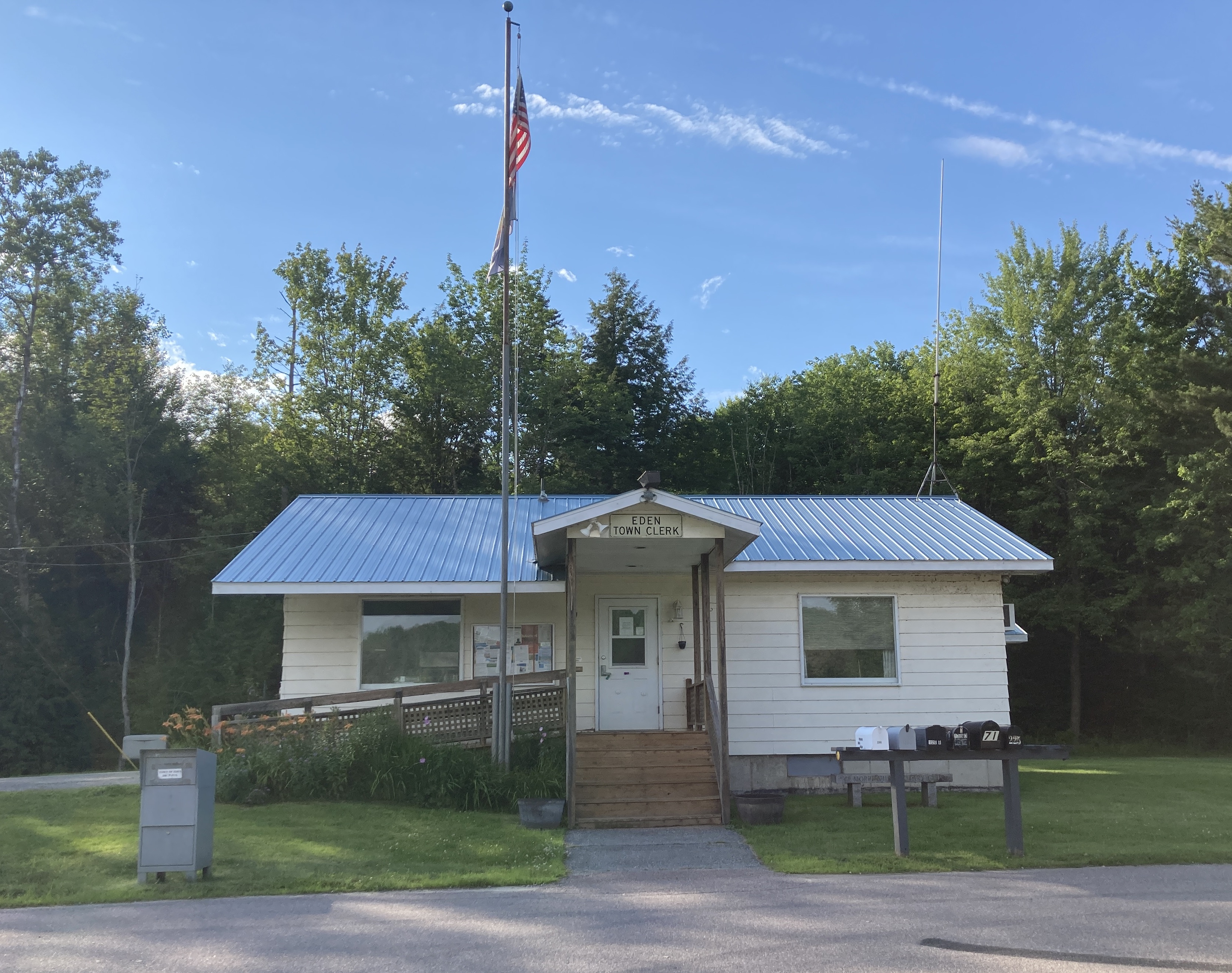
- Town Clerk's office

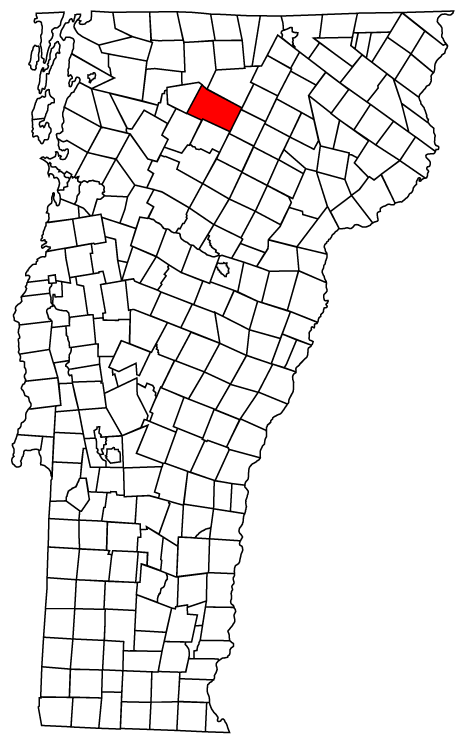
- Eden, Vermont
- Coordinates: 44°43′51″N 72°34′25″W
- Country: United States
- State: Vermont
- County: Lamoille
- Communities: Eden; Eden Mills; North Hyde Park

Area
  - Total: 64.3 sq mi (166.5 km^{2})
  - Land: 63.3 sq mi (164.0 km^{2})
  - Water: 1.0 sq mi (2.6 km^{2})
- Elevation: 1,165 ft (355 m)

Population (2020)
  - Total: 1,338
  - Density: 21/sq mi (8.2/km^{2})
- Time zone: UTC−5 (Eastern (EST))
  - Summer (DST): UTC−4 (EDT)
- ZIP codes: 05652 (Eden); 05653 (Eden Mills)
- Area code: 802
- FIPS code: 50-23500
- GNIS feature ID: 1462088
- Website: www.edenvt.org

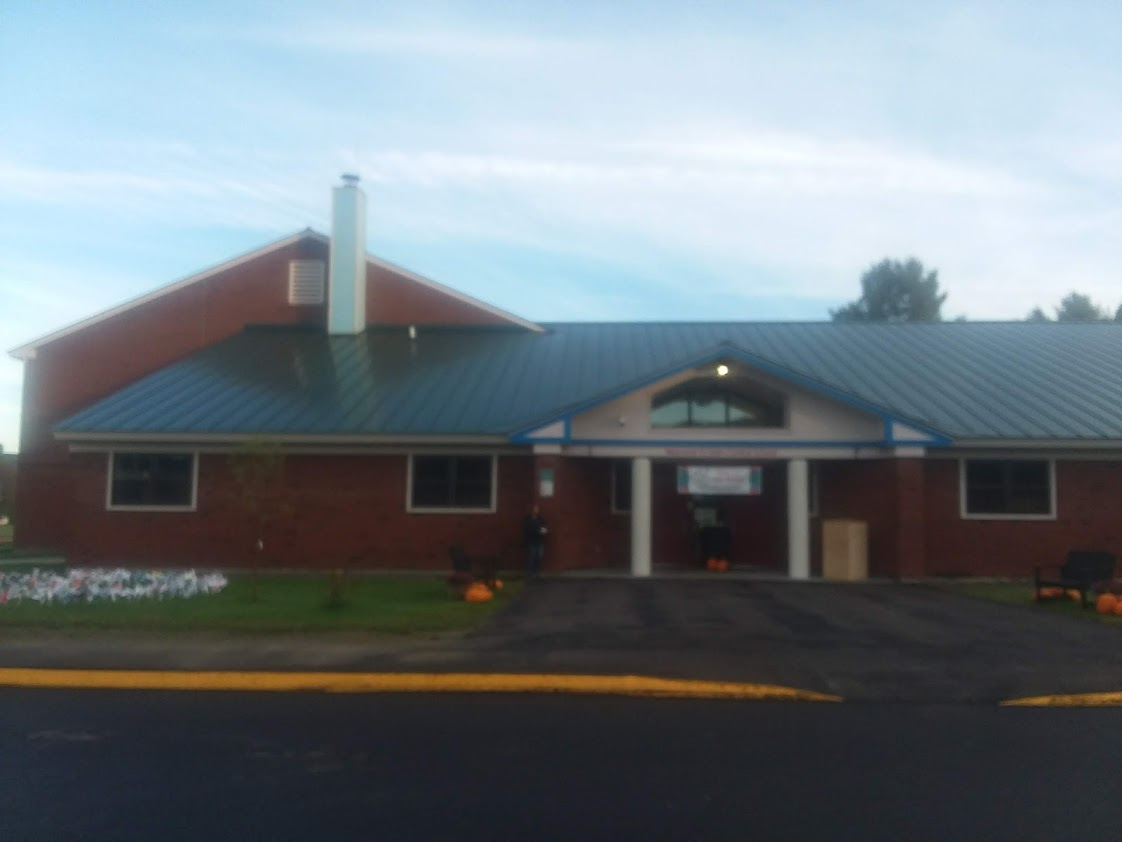
Eden Central School

Eden is a town in Lamoille County, Vermont, United States. The population was 1,338 at the 2020 census.

== Overview ==
Eden is one of the largest towns in Vermont by area. According to the United States Census Bureau, the town has a total area of 64.3 square miles (166.5 km^{2}), of which 63.3 square miles (164.0 km^{2}) are land and 1.0 square mile (2.6 km^{2}), or 1.54%, are water; 15.9 square miles (41 km^{2}) are conserved land. The villages of Eden and Eden Mills, each of which has its own ZIP Code, are in the center of the town, Eden to the west and Eden Mills to the east. The center of the town is drained by the Gihon River, a southwest-flowing tributary of the Lamoille River. The eastern portion of the town drains southward via Boomhour Branch and Wiley Brook to the Green River, another tributary of the Lamoille. The westernmost part of town drains to the North Branch of the Lamoille. The Long Trail passes through the town on the crest of the Green Mountains, separating the North Branch watershed from the Gihon River watershed.

Vermont Route 100 crosses the center of town, passing through the villages of Eden and Eden Mills. Route 100 leads northeast 24 miles (39 km) to Route 105 in the western part of Newport and southwest 10 miles (16 km) to Hyde Park. Route 118 leaves Route 100 in Eden village and leads northwest 17 miles (27 km) to Montgomery.

The Babcock Nature Preserve, a geologically significant tract of land used by Johnson State College and students of other Vermont state colleges, is located in the northwest part of Eden. The preserve is used for teaching courses in geology, field biology, and field ornithology.

Lake Eden is located in Eden and is a popular summer destination; a lottery is held each fall to reserve RV sites for the following summer. There are roughly 120 privately owned family camps lining the 198 acre lake.

Eden Notch is located at the northern edge of Eden on Route 100.

The town contains part of the census-designated place of North Hyde Park.

The town was the center of a local controversy in 2009. A roughly 1500 acre asbestos mine was suspected of environmental contamination. The site was considered for a Superfund designation by the EPA. After further study research and controversy, the site was deemed not dangerous. An apology statement was issued by state and federal environmental protection agencies.

=== Climate ===
Climate data for Eden 2 S, 1991–2020 normals: 1456ft (444m)
Month	Jan	Feb	Mar	Apr	May	Jun	Jul	Aug	Sep	Oct	Nov	Dec	Year
Record high °F (°C)	57 (14)	60 (16)	77 (25)	85 (29)	86 (30)	90 (32)	91 (33)	89 (32)	89 (32)	78 (26)	69 (21)	64 (18)	91 (33)
Mean maximum °F (°C)	45.1 (7.3)	48.5 (9.2)	59.0 (15.0)	76.3 (24.6)	81.9 (27.7)	86.1 (30.1)	85.7 (29.8)	84.2 (29.0)	81.9 (27.7)	72.4 (22.4)	62.3 (16.8)	50.5 (10.3)	84.7 (29.3)
Mean daily maximum °F (°C)	23.3 (−4.8)	26.7 (−2.9)	35.6 (2.0)	48.7 (9.3)	63.5 (17.5)	71.2 (21.8)	75.3 (24.1)	73.8 (23.2)	66.7 (19.3)	53.7 (12.1)	40.2 (4.6)	29.3 (−1.5)	50.7 (10.4)
Daily mean °F (°C)	14.8 (−9.6)	17.5 (−8.1)	27.0 (−2.8)	39.9 (4.4)	53.7 (12.1)	62.2 (16.8)	66.4 (19.1)	64.9 (18.3)	57.8 (14.3)	45.5 (7.5)	33.4 (0.8)	22.2 (−5.4)	42.1 (5.6)
Mean daily minimum °F (°C)	6.3 (−14.3)	8.2 (−13.2)	18.4 (−7.6)	31.0 (−0.6)	43.9 (6.6)	53.2 (11.8)	57.6 (14.2)	56.0 (13.3)	48.9 (9.4)	37.3 (2.9)	26.6 (−3.0)	15.0 (−9.4)	33.5 (0.8)
Mean minimum °F (°C)	−14.7 (−25.9)	−8.9 (−22.7)	−3.5 (−19.7)	19.3 (−7.1)	30.9 (−0.6)	39.9 (4.4)	47.9 (8.8)	44.9 (7.2)	36.1 (2.3)	24.1 (−4.4)	12.9 (−10.6)	−6.7 (−21.5)	−16.3 (−26.8)
Record low °F (°C)	−25 (−32)	−21 (−29)	−19 (−28)	7 (−14)	25 (−4)	33 (1)	42 (6)	42 (6)	27 (−3)	19 (−7)	3 (−16)	−20 (−29)	−25 (−32)
Average precipitation inches (mm)	2.95 (75)	2.67 (68)	3.39 (86)	3.50 (89)	3.98 (101)	4.81 (122)	4.40 (112)	4.93 (125)	3.73 (95)	4.22 (107)	3.78 (96)	3.76 (96)	46.12 (1,172)
Average snowfall inches (cm)	36.1 (92)	33.4 (85)	31.6 (80)	10.6 (27)	0.4 (1.0)	0.0 (0.0)	0.0 (0.0)	0.0 (0.0)	0.0 (0.0)	4.0 (10)	13.6 (35)	39.2 (100)	168.9 (430)
Source 1: NOAA(1981-2010 Precipitation)
Source 2: XMACIS2 (1998-2020 snowfall, records & monthly max/mins)

== School ==
The single public school in Eden serves slightly more than 100 students. The ECS mascot is Eddie the Eagle. Eden Central School is located at 140 Knowles Flat Road just off route 100. The school serves pre-K through 6th-grade students. In 2018, ECS was the recipient of a Year of the Book Grant from the Children's Literacy Foundation.

Eden is part of the Lamoille North Unified School District. Elementary students attend Eden Central School, which includes outdoor classroom area, a garden and sports fields. Middle and high school students attend Lamoille Union High School in nearby Hyde Park.

== Government ==
=== Legislators ===
The two-member at-large Essex-Orleans Senate district includes the town of Eden, as well as parts or all of Essex, Orleans, Franklin and Lamoille counties.

== History ==
Eden was chartered in 1781 to 72 Green Mountain Boys who fought in the Revolutionary War. However, town history shows that Eden was not settled until after 1800, and none of the veterans to whom the town was originally chartered ever settled there.

=== Belvidere Mountain ===
An asbestos mine on Belvidere Mountain which operated from 1936 to 1993 left an estimated 3,500,000 cubic yards (2,700,000 m^{3}) of mill tailings. In 2008, the state warned residents of Eden and nearby towns that there was a "health risk" for people living within a 10-mile (16 km) radius of the mine. The aboveground mill tailings had seeped into the ground water systems and were estimated at 16,000,000 cubic yards (12,000,000 m^{3}).

In April 2009, the Vermont Department of Health released a revised study which found that all of the deaths related to the asbestos were caused by workplace exposure, unrelated to living near the mine. The report also concluded that people living near the mines had no increased risk of asbestos-related illness vis-a-vis people living anywhere else in Vermont.

Remediation efforts continue at the site of the mine, with a focus on limiting recreational access to the mine site, erosion control and managing runoff from the site, which seems to be working according to Vermont Public's Brave Little State. Air monitors installed near the site have not found evidence of airborne asbestos leaving the site of the mine.

Historical population
Census	Pop.	Note	%±
1800	29		—
1810	224		672.4%
1820	201		−10.3%
1830	461		129.4%
1840	702		52.3%
1850	668		−4.8%
1860	919		37.6%
1870	958		4.2%
1880	934		−2.5%
1890	851		−8.9%
1900	788		−7.4%
1910	751		−4.7%
1920	619		−17.6%
1930	568		−8.2%
1940	498		−12.3%
1950	496		−0.4%
1960	430		−13.3%
1970	513		19.3%
1980	612		19.3%
1990	840		37.3%
2000	1,152		37.1%
2010	1,323		14.8%
2020	1,338		1.1%
U.S. Decennial Census

== Demographics ==
As of the census of 2000, there were 1,152 people, 409 households, and 312 families residing in the town. The population density was 18.1 people per square mile (7.0/km^{2}). There were 582 housing units at an average density of 9.2 per square mile (3.5/km^{2}). 151 (26%) of those housing units were seasonal homes. The racial makeup of the town was 95.57% White, 0.17% African American, 1.30% Native American, 0.09% Asian, 0.43% Pacific Islander, and 2.43% from two or more races. Hispanic or Latino of any race were 1.22% of the population.

There were 409 households, out of which 41.6% had children under the age of 18 living with them, 56.2% were couples living together and joined in either marriage or civil union, 10.8% had a female householder with no husband present, and 23.7% were non-families. 16.9% of all households were made up of individuals, and 3.9% had someone living alone who was 65 years of age or older. The average household size was 2.82 and the average family size was 3.08.

In the town, the population was spread out, with 31.1% under the age of 18, 7.3% from 18 to 24, 31.9% from 25 to 44, 22.7% from 45 to 64, and 6.9% who were 65 years of age or older. The median age was 34 years. For every 100 females, there were 104.3 males. For every 100 females age 18 and over, there were 102.0 males.

The median income for a household in the town was $35,417, and the median income for a family was $35,380. Males had a median income of $27,717 versus $21,705 for females. The per capita income for the town was $13,391. About 10.3% of families and 10.7% of the population were below the poverty line, including 14.1% of those under age 18 and 12.5% of those age 65 or over.

== Notable people ==
- Philip Cummings, news analyst and lecturer; had a summer home in Eden Mills
- Frank Plumley, U.S. congressman; born in Eden
- Harold C. Sylvester, judge of the Vermont Superior Court and associate justice of the Vermont Supreme Court; born in Eden
- George W. Weightman, U.S. Army major general; born in Eden Mills
