= Green River Reservoir State Park (Vermont) =

State park in Lamoille County, Vermont

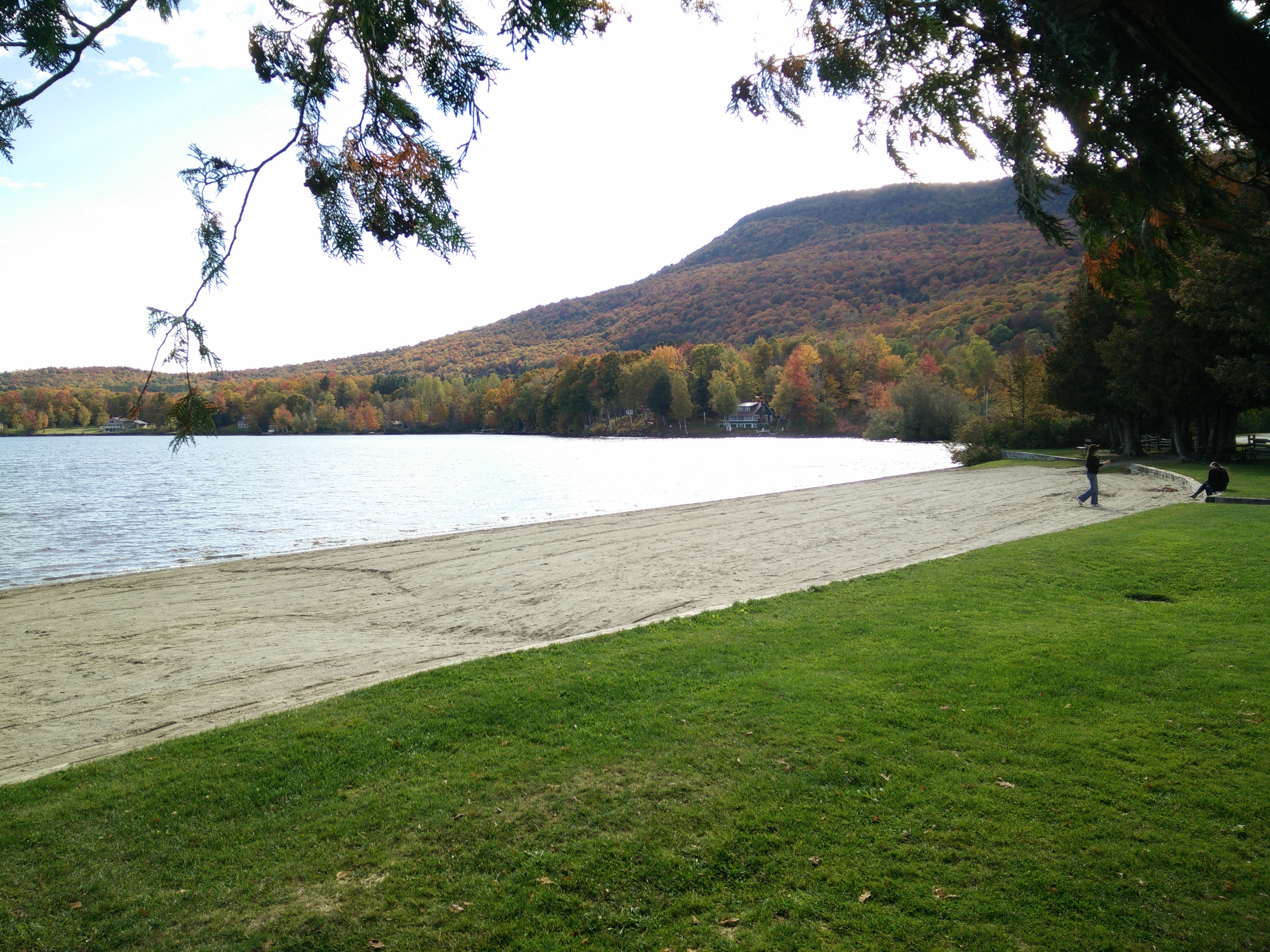
- Water and shore at the park with forested hills in the background

- Location within Vermont
- Interactive map of Green River Reservoir State Park
- Location: Hyde Park and Eden, Vermont, United States
- Coordinates: 44°37′18″N 72°31′36″W
- Area: 5,503 acres (2,227 ha)
- Established: 1999
- Administrator: Vermont Department of Forests, Parks, and Recreation
- Website: Official website
- Vermont State Parks

Green River Reservoir State Park is a 5,500-acre (2,227-hectare) state park on the shore of 554-acre (224-hectare) Green River Reservoir in the towns of Hyde Park and Eden, Vermont, United States. The park is undeveloped, with only low-impact recreational use allowed on and around the reservoir. Activities includes camping, swimming, boating, fishing, picnicking (at designated day-use-sites, access by boat only), wildlife watching. The park features 27 remote campsites around the reservoir, which can be reached only by boat. Only boats powered by electric motors up to 5 mph and human-powered watercraft are allowed.

== History ==
Green River Reservoir was created by an 80-year-old hydroelectric dam owned by Morrisville Water and Light. The dam was built in 1946/47 for flood control and to supply hydropower to the Town and Village of Morrisville. The reservoir became a state park in 1999 when 5,503 acres were purchased from the Morrisville Water and Light Department.
