= Lamoille County, Vermont =

County in Vermont, United States

- County
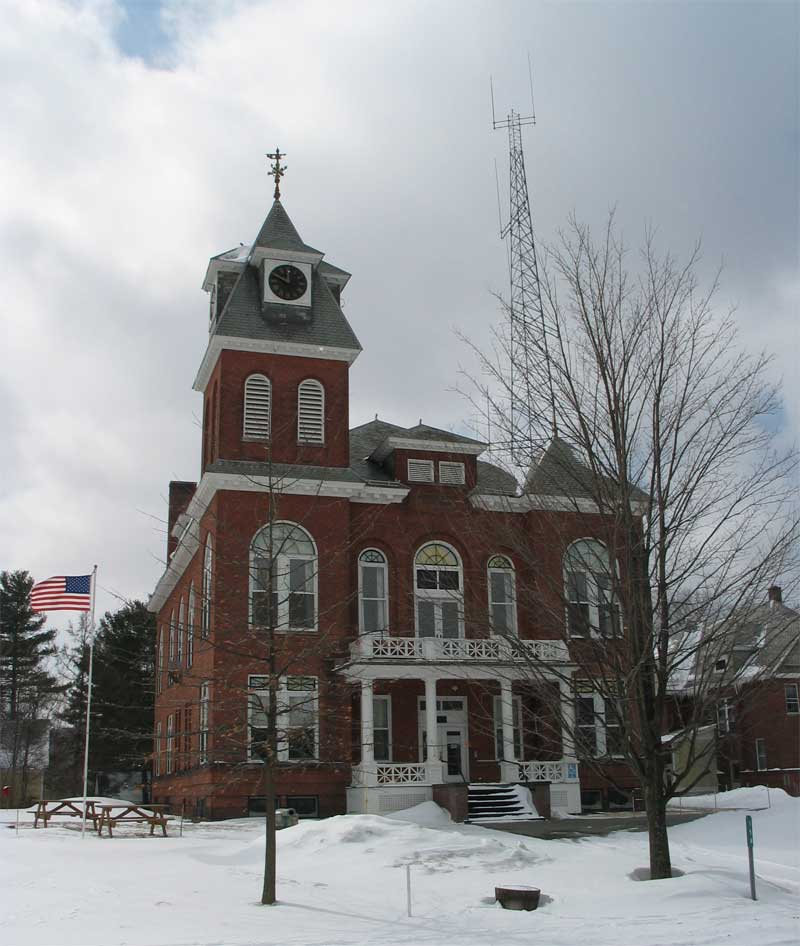
- Lamoille County Courthouse in Hyde Park

- Location within the U.S. state of Vermont
- Coordinates: 44.61°N 72.65°W
- Country: United States
- State: Vermont
- Founded: 1836
- Named for: Lamoille River
- Shire Town: Hyde Park
- Largest town: Morristown

Area
  - Total: 464 sq mi (1,200 km^{2})
  - Land: 459 sq mi (1,190 km^{2})
  - Water: 4.9 sq mi (13 km^{2}) 1.1%

Population (2020)
  - Total: 25,945
  - Estimate (2025): 26,294 ▲
  - Density: 56.5/sq mi (21.8/km^{2})
- Time zone: UTC−5 (Eastern)
  - Summer (DST): UTC−4 (EDT)
- Congressional district: At-large
- Website: www.lcpcvt.org

Lamoille County (/ləˈmɔɪl/) is a county located in the U.S. state of Vermont. As of the 2020 census, the population was 25,945, and it is the third-least populous county in Vermont. Its shire town (county seat) is the town of Hyde Park, while Morristown is the county's largest town by population as well as its main commercial center. The county was created in 1835 from portions of Orleans, Franklin, Washington, and Chittenden Counties and organized the following year.

== History ==
The area was buried in a mile of ice during the Ice Age. As the ice melted, Lake Stowe was formed. When the ice melted completely, the water from the lake ran out through the Lamoille River valley.

This area was long occupied by the Algonquian-speaking indigenous Abenaki people and their ancestors. During French colonization of what is now Canada, fur traders began to trade with the Abenaki. There were also French who settled here, coming down from the settlements in Quebec, and named the Lamoille River. The French later enlisted the Abenaki as allies in the frontier raiding and wars with English colonists in the lower New England colonies. For decades there was no border and peoples passed freely through this area.

After the American Revolutionary War and Vermont's admission as a separate state, the county was settled in the 19th century by American migrants from other parts of New England and French-Canadian immigrants from across the border. Some developed small farms. Some came to work in the asbestos mine on Belvidere Mountain, which operated into the 20th century. Some gradually moved to other counties where there were cotton mills, weaving cotton from the South both before and after the Civil War. In the United States, many of the French immigrants were forced to accept anglicization of their names, such as New City for Villeneuve, or Senton for St. Onge. Some of their descendants have reclaimed their family's original names.

=== 20th century to present ===
Mining continued through the 20th century. By the late 20th century, environmental hazards were better understood, but many of the miners contracted asbestosis and other diseases of the lungs from their work.

In 1972, the Lamoille Community College was the fifth of the several community colleges that became part of the Vermont State Colleges system. At the time, they were renamed as Community College of Vermont.

In 2008, the state notified residents of Belvidere, Eden, Hyde Park, Johnson, Waterville and eight towns in the adjacent counties of Orleans and Franklin, that a review of health records from 1995 to 2006 had revealed that residents within ten miles (16 km) of the former asbestos mine on Belvidere Mountain had higher than normal rates of contracting asbestosis. The state and federal government continued to study this problem.

In April 2009 the Vermont Department of health released a revised study which found that all of deaths related to the asbestos mine were caused by individual occupational exposure. The report concluded that people living near the mines had no more increased risk of asbestos-related illness than people living anywhere else in Vermont.

In 2008, the county appeared to have disproportionate power in the legislature with the House Speaker, Shap Smith, from Morrisville, Floyd Nease, house majority leader, Senator Susan Bartlett, from Hyde Park, chair of the House Appropriations Committee, and Richard Westman, chair of the House Transportation Committee and the sole Republican.

According to a 2020 study by ProPublica, Lamoille County, Vermont may be the safest county in the U.S. from climate-induced disasters such as rising sea levels, wildfires, crop depletion, and extreme heat and humidity.

== Geography ==
According to the U.S. Census Bureau, the county has a total area of 464 square miles (1,200 km^{2}), of which 459 square miles (1,190 km^{2}) is land and 4.9 square miles (13 km^{2}) (1.1%) is water. It is the second-smallest county in Vermont by area, as well as one of only two Vermont counties that does not share a border with another state or with Quebec.

Lamoille County is the only county in Vermont that does not have at least one of Vermont's five U.S. Routes passing through it, although all ten of the Lamoille County towns are served by Vermont state routes.

=== Adjacent counties ===
- Orleans County — northeast
- Caledonia County — east
- Washington County — south
- Chittenden County — west
- Franklin County — northwest

== Demographics ==
Historical population
Census	Pop.	Note	%±
1840	10,475		—
1850	10,872		3.8%
1860	12,311		13.2%
1870	12,448		1.1%
1880	12,684		1.9%
1890	12,831		1.2%
1900	12,289		−4.2%
1910	12,585		2.4%
1920	11,858		−5.8%
1930	10,947		−7.7%
1940	11,028		0.7%
1950	11,388		3.3%
1960	11,027		−3.2%
1970	13,309		20.7%
1980	16,767		26.0%
1990	19,735		17.7%
2000	23,233		17.7%
2010	24,475		5.3%
2020	25,945		6.0%
2025 (est.)	26,294	▲	1.3%
U.S. Decennial Census; 1790–1960 1900–1990; 1990–2000 2010–2018

=== 2020 census ===
As of the 2020 census, the county had a population of 25,945. Of the residents, 20.0% were under the age of 18 and 18.6% were 65 years of age or older; the median age was 42.3 years. For every 100 females there were 97.4 males, and for every 100 females age 18 and over there were 97.1 males.

The racial makeup of the county was 91.6% White, 0.9% Black or African American, 0.3% American Indian and Alaska Native, 0.5% Asian, 0.8% from some other race, and 5.8% from two or more races. Hispanic or Latino residents of any race comprised 2.5% of the population.

There were 10,994 households in the county, of which 27.2% had children under the age of 18 living with them and 23.4% had a female householder with no spouse or partner present. About 29.9% of all households were made up of individuals and 12.4% had someone living alone who was 65 years of age or older.

There were 13,878 housing units, of which 20.8% were vacant. Among occupied housing units, 70.6% were owner-occupied and 29.4% were renter-occupied. The homeowner vacancy rate was 1.3% and the rental vacancy rate was 8.2%.

Lamoille County, Vermont – Racial and ethnic composition Note: the US Census treats Hispanic/Latino as an ethnic category. This table excludes Latinos from the racial categories and assigns them to a separate category. Hispanics/Latinos may be of any race.
Race / Ethnicity (NH = Non-Hispanic)	Pop 2000	Pop 2010	Pop 2020	% 2000	% 2010	% 2020
White alone (NH)	22,481	23,427	23,585	96.76%	95.71%	90.90%
Black or African American alone (NH)	72	142	217	0.30%	0.58%	0.83%
Native American or Alaska Native alone (NH)	98	88	88	0.42%	0.35%	0.33%
Asian alone (NH)	86	124	141	0.37%	0.50%	0.54%
Pacific Islander alone (NH)	2	3	1	0.00%	0.01%	0.00%
Other race alone (NH)	14	30	121	0.06%	0.12%	0.46%
Mixed race or Multiracial (NH)	300	339	1,141	1.29%	1.38%	4.39%
Hispanic or Latino (any race)	180	322	651	0.77%	1.31%	2.50%
Total	23,233	24,475	25,945	100.00%	100.00%	100.00%

=== 2010 census ===
As of the 2010 United States census, there were 24,475 people, 10,014 households, and 6,274 families living in the county. The population density was 53.3 inhabitants per square mile (20.6/km^{2}). There were 12,969 housing units at an average density of 28.3 units per square mile (10.9 units/km^{2}). The racial makeup of the county was 96.7% white, 0.6% black or African American, 0.5% Asian, 0.4% American Indian, 0.3% from other races, and 1.5% from two or more races. Those of Hispanic or Latino origin made up 1.3% of the population. In terms of ancestry, 18.3% were English, 16.5% were Irish, 15.2% were French, 10.2% were German, 7.7% were French Canadian, and 4.6% were American.

Of the 10,014 households, 30.6% had children under the age of 18 living with them, 48.3% were married couples living together, 9.4% had a female householder with no husband present, 37.3% were non-families, and 27.3% of all households were made up of individuals. The average household size was 2.37 and the average family size was 2.87. The median age was 39.7 years.

The median income for a household in the county was $52,232 and the median income for a family was $62,364. Males had a median income of $41,761 versus $31,250 for females. The per capita income for the county was $27,164. About 8.7% of families and 12.0% of the population were below the poverty line, including 15.0% of those under age 18 and 8.4% of those age 65 or over.

=== 2000 census ===
As of the census of 2000, there were 23,233 people, 9,221 households, and 5,984 families living in the county. The population density was 50 people per square mile (19 people/km^{2}). There were 11,009 housing units at an average density of 24 units per square mile (9.3 units/km^{2}). The racial makeup of the county was 97.31% White, 0.33% Black or African American, 0.45% Native American, 0.37% Asian, 0.03% Pacific Islander, 0.12% from other races, and 1.39% from two or more races. 0.77% of the population were Hispanic or Latino of any race. 15.7% were of English, 14.5% American, 11.9% Irish, 11.4% French, 8.7% French Canadian, 7.0% German and 5.2% Italian ancestry. 95.9% spoke English and 2.4% French at home.

There were 9,221 households, out of which 32.00% had children under the age of 18 living with them, 51.40% were married couples living together, 8.90% had a female householder with no husband present, and 35.10% were non-families. 25.00% of all households were made up of individuals, and 8.10% had someone living alone who was 65 years of age or older. The average household size was 2.45 and the average family size was 2.94.

In the county, the population was spread out, with 24.30% under the age of 18, 10.00% from 18 to 24, 29.90% from 25 to 44, 24.50% from 45 to 64, and 11.40% who were 65 years of age or older. The median age was 36 years. For every 100 females there were 100.10 males. For every 100 females age 18 and over, there were 97.30 males.

The median income for a household in the county was $39,356, and the median income for a family was $44,620. Males had a median income of $30,848 versus $24,444 for females. The per capita income for the county was $20,972. About 6.40% of families and 9.60% of the population were below the poverty line, including 10.70% of those under age 18 and 8.50% of those age 65 or over.

== Politics ==
After being formed in 1836, Lamoille County was unable to vote in that year's presidential election.

In 1840 the county was won by Whig Party candidate William Henry Harrison.

In 1844, the county was won by Democratic Party candidate James K. Polk.

In 1848 and 1852, the county was won by Free Soil Party candidates Martin Van Buren and John P. Hale, respectively.

From John C. Frémont in 1856 to Richard Nixon in 1960 (barring 1912, where the county was won by Progressive Party candidate and former president Theodore Roosevelt), the Republican Party would have a 104-year winning streak in the county.

In 1964, the county was won by Democratic Party incumbent President Lyndon B. Johnson.

Following the Democrat's victory in 1964, the county went back to voting for Republican candidates for another 20 year winning streak starting with Richard Nixon in 1968 and ending with George H. W. Bush in 1988, who became the last Republican presidential candidate to win the county.

In 1992 the county was won by Bill Clinton and has been won by Democratic presidential candidates ever since.

United States presidential election results for Lamoille County, Vermont
Year	Republican		Democratic		Third party(ies)	
Year	No.	%	No.	%	No.	%
1880	1,702	66.56%	587	22.96%	268	10.48%
1884	1,567	64.35%	631	25.91%	237	9.73%
1888	1,797	74.10%	543	22.39%	85	3.51%
1892	1,470	72.13%	517	25.37%	51	2.50%
1896	2,061	80.79%	440	17.25%	50	1.96%
1900	1,742	79.15%	418	18.99%	41	1.86%
1904	1,521	81.73%	296	15.91%	44	2.36%
1908	1,455	79.03%	311	16.89%	75	4.07%
1912	852	36.04%	431	18.23%	1,081	45.73%
1916	1,474	67.12%	643	29.28%	79	3.60%
1920	2,311	82.07%	458	16.26%	47	1.67%
1924	2,480	86.23%	305	10.61%	91	3.16%
1928	3,262	84.64%	576	14.95%	16	0.42%
1932	2,599	69.70%	1,096	29.39%	34	0.91%
1936	2,846	68.79%	1,279	30.92%	12	0.29%
1940	2,566	63.61%	1,463	36.27%	5	0.12%
1944	2,212	68.21%	1,031	31.79%	0	0.00%
1948	2,344	73.69%	816	25.65%	21	0.66%
1952	3,516	84.52%	633	15.22%	11	0.26%
1956	3,464	83.63%	678	16.37%	0	0.00%
1960	3,272	76.02%	1,032	23.98%	0	0.00%
1964	2,036	46.15%	2,376	53.85%	0	0.00%
1968	2,965	68.04%	1,239	28.43%	154	3.53%
1972	4,164	70.16%	1,659	27.95%	112	1.89%
1976	3,535	61.56%	2,016	35.11%	191	3.33%
1980	3,228	46.85%	2,414	35.04%	1,248	18.11%
1984	4,674	62.10%	2,746	36.49%	106	1.41%
1988	4,433	54.51%	3,561	43.78%	139	1.71%
1992	2,936	28.95%	4,459	43.97%	2,747	27.09%
1996	2,705	29.45%	4,997	54.40%	1,484	16.16%
2000	4,456	39.62%	5,676	50.47%	1,114	9.91%
2004	4,260	34.97%	7,636	62.69%	285	2.34%
2008	3,515	27.75%	8,914	70.37%	239	1.89%
2012	3,342	27.88%	8,371	69.83%	275	2.29%
2016	3,570	27.97%	7,241	56.74%	1,951	15.29%
2020	4,163	27.91%	10,240	68.66%	512	3.43%
2024	4,505	30.35%	9,788	65.94%	551	3.71%

== Education ==
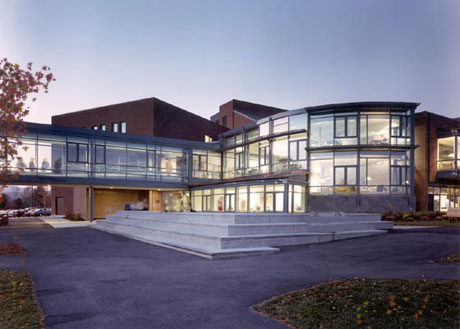
Northern Vermont University-Johnson Library and Learning Center

Northern Vermont University-Johnson is a Vermont State College located in Johnson in Lamoille County. It was established in 1828 as Johnson Academy. It was among the original colleges to come together to form the Vermont State College system.

The Community College of Vermont (CCV) is located in Morrisville in Lamoille County.

== Communities ==
=== Towns ===
- Belvidere
- Cambridge
- Eden
- Elmore
- Hyde Park (shire town)
- Johnson
- Morristown
- Stowe
- Waterville
- Wolcott

=== Villages ===
- Cambridge
- Hyde Park
- Jeffersonville
- Johnson
- Morrisville

=== Census-designated places ===
- North Hyde Park
- Stowe
- Wolcott

=== Unincorporated communities ===
- Belvidere Center
- Eden Mills
- Moscow

== See also ==
- National Register of Historic Places listings in Lamoille County, Vermont
