= Stowe (CDP), Vermont =

Census-designated place in Vermont, United States

Stowe, Vermont
- Census-designated place
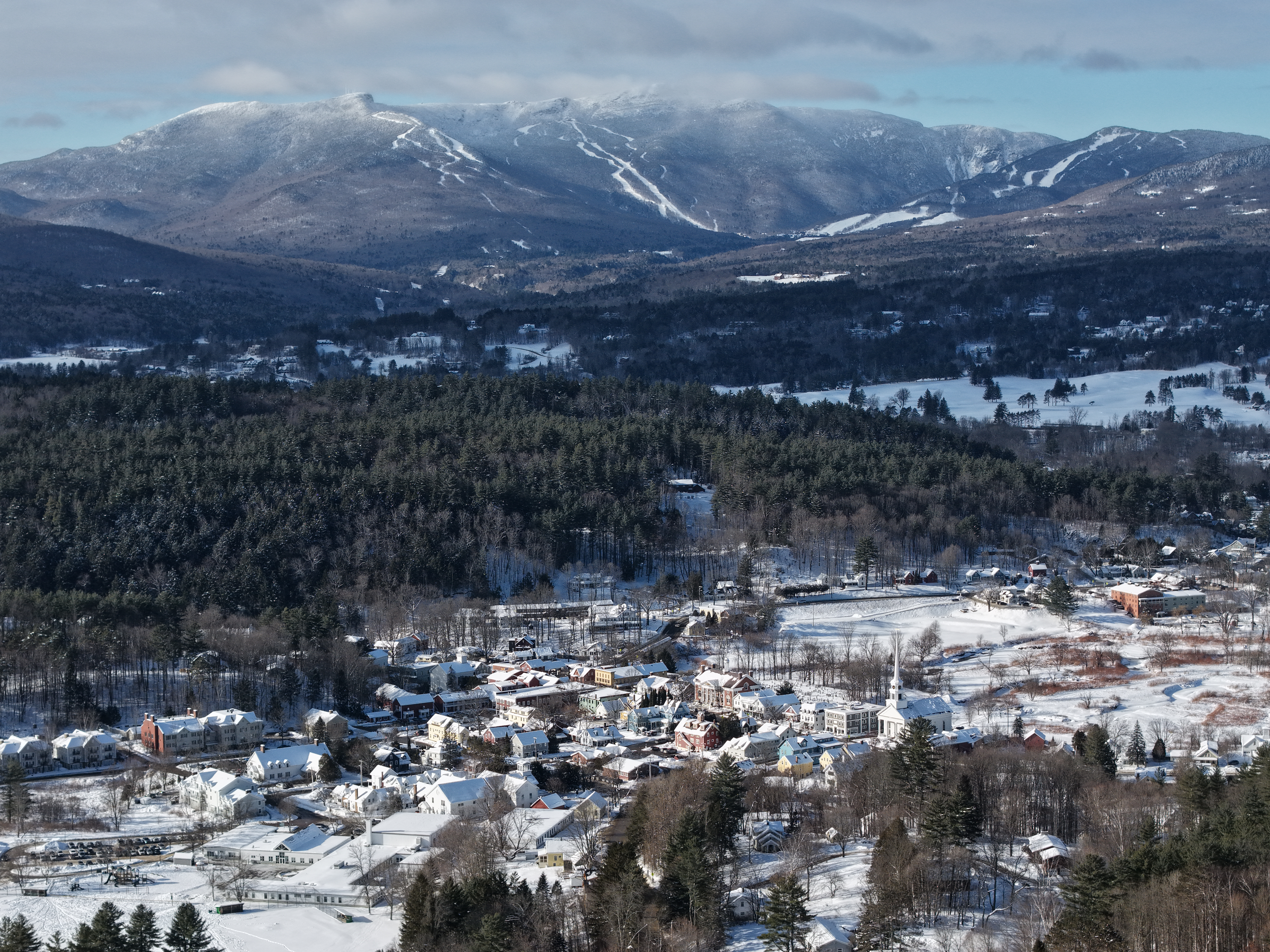
- Stowe, VT, from the southeast

- Location in Vermont Location in the United States
- Coordinates: 44°27′56″N 72°41′06″W
- Country: United States
- State: Vermont
- County: Lamoille
- Town: Stowe

Area
  - Total: 0.82 sq mi (2.13 km^{2})
  - Land: 0.81 sq mi (2.11 km^{2})
  - Water: 0.0077 sq mi (0.02 km^{2})
- Elevation: 722 ft (220 m)

Population (2010)
  - Total: 495
  - Density: 608/sq mi (234.6/km^{2})
- Time zone: UTC−5 (Eastern (EST))
  - Summer (DST): UTC−4 (EDT)
- ZIP Code: 05672
- Area code: 802
- FIPS code: 50-70450
- GNIS feature ID: 2586656

Stowe is a census-designated place (CDP) comprising the central community in the town of Stowe, Lamoille County, Vermont, United States. As of the 2010 census the population of the CDP was 495, out of 4,314 in the entire town.

== Geography ==
Stowe village is in the eastern part of the town of Stowe, along the Little River where it is joined by the West Branch. Vermont Route 100 passes through the village, leading north 9 miles (14 km) to Morrisville and south 10 miles (16 km) to Waterbury and Interstate 89. Vermont Route 108 has its southern terminus in Stowe village and leads north through Smugglers Notch 17 miles (27 km) to Jeffersonville.

According to the United States Census Bureau, the Stowe CDP has a total area of 0.81 square miles (2.1 km^{2}), of which 0.01 square miles (0.02 km^{2}), or 1.02%, are water. Via the Little River, Stowe is part of the Winooski River watershed draining westward to Lake Champlain.
