= Arthur Wallace Peach =

American poet and Vermont historian

Arthur Wallace Peach (1886–1956) was an American poet, the first English chair at Norwich University, and the director of the Vermont Historical Society. His poetry has been covered extensively in scholarly sources, and have been published in many poetry collections.
