= Philip Cummings =

World traveler, teacher of modern languages, lecturer and news analyst

Philip Harry Cummings (1906–1991) was a world traveler, teacher of Spanish and other languages, news analyst, and public speaker.

The only child of Harry Foster and Addie Cummings, Philip was born and grew up in Hardwick, Vermont. His father was a prosperous insurance and real estate salesman. Philip received a B.A. in Modern Languages from Rollins College in 1929, and an M.A. in Spanish from Middlebury College, 1932. He began but did not complete a Ph.D. in Spanish at what was then the University of North Carolina. One article from his research there was published in the professional journal Hispania.

Cummings was a great traveler and made sixteen transatlantic crossings between ages 19 and 29. A classmate at Rollins remembered him clearly after 45 years as "one of the most remarkable persons she had ever met".

Cummings sometimes wrote to important people, such as the eminent Spanish scholar Miguel de Unamuno, "cold" and was able to meet them. He was introduced to Alfonso XIII, King of Spain at court and got to know the Spanish royal family and the Duke of Alba.

One of the most important episodes in Cummings's life was the ten days he spent with his friend and lover, Spanish poet and playwright Federico García Lorca, in August 1929. The two met in Madrid in 1928 and spent another brief time together when Lorca was en route to New York in June 1929. At the conclusion of the Columbia University summer session of 1929, Lorca went by train to Burlington, Vermont, and from there to the Cummings family's summer rental cottage in Eden Mills, Vermont. During that visit, Cummings translated Lorca's book Canciones (Songs) into English, with Lorca's advice on key points. This is the only translation of Lorca's work into any language in which he is known to have participated. During this period, Lorca also wrote several poems that became part of his book Poeta en Nueva York.

Cummings and Lorca renewed their friendship in the fall of 1930 when Cummings returned to Madrid on a IIE fellowship. He returned to the United States abruptly the following spring on the advice of his IIE sponsors, just before Alfonso XIII left the throne. There is no evidence that Cummings ever saw Lorca again, although they may have continued to exchange letters. He did not return to Spain for many years; he was unhappy with Spain's new, leftist government.

Cummings claimed to have destroyed an autobiographical manuscript that Lorca left with him in 1929, but there is no independent evidence that the manuscript ever existed, and Cummings is far from a reliable source.

In the midst of the Great Depression, Cummings was happy to get a job teaching Spanish, French, and German at the Valley Ranch School for Boys in Cody, Wyoming. He kept a detailed diary of his first year there. One portion, dealing with a school holiday visit to the South Dakota capital, Pierre, has been published, and the rest is being prepared for publication. The school closed in 1934.

Starting in 1938, Cummings began a new career as a paid lecturer and news analyst. He was represented by various agencies; in the 1950s he was represented by the W. Colston Leigh agency of New York, Washington, and San Francisco, where he joined a roster of speakers that included such famous names as David Brinkley, Vance Packard, and Eleanor Roosevelt. Cummings's appeal as a lecturer was reflected in his billing as the agency's top repeat speaker on world affairs.

He made his home for many years in Woodstock, Vermont.
