= Johnson, Vermont =

- Town
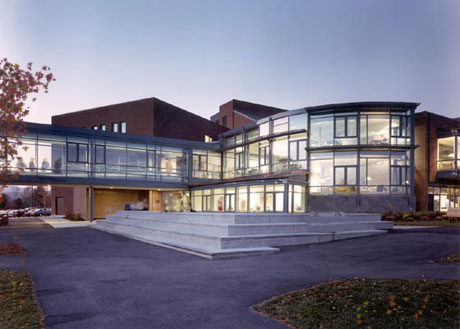
- Northern Vermont University-Johnson

- Seal

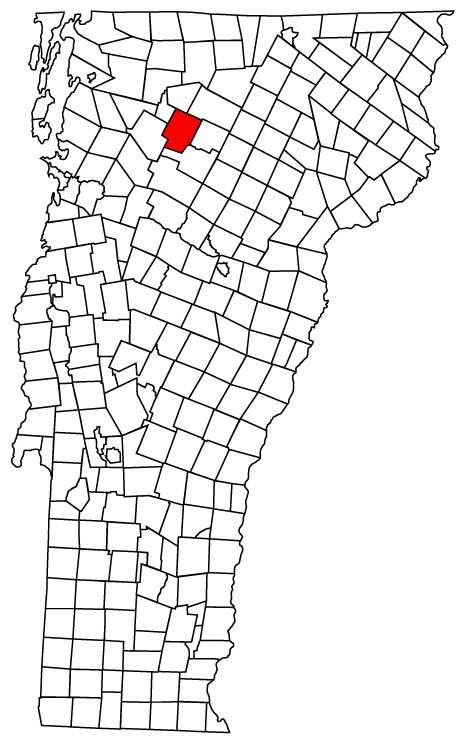
- Located in Lamoille County, Vermont
- Coordinates: 44°38′38″N 72°40′52″W
- Country: United States
- State: Vermont
- County: Lamoille
- Chartered: 1792 (Vermont)
- Communities: Johnson; East Johnson; North Hyde Park

Area
  - Total: 45.1 sq mi (116.8 km^{2})
  - Land: 44.7 sq mi (115.8 km^{2})
  - Water: 0.39 sq mi (1.0 km^{2}) 0.84%
- Elevation: 702 ft (214 m)

Population (2020)
  - Total: 3,491
  - Density: 78/sq mi (30.1/km^{2})
- Time zone: UTC-5 (EST)
  - Summer (DST): UTC-4 (EDT)
- ZIP code: 05656
- Area code: 802
- GNIS feature ID: 1462129
- Website: www.townofjohnson.com

Johnson is a town in Lamoille County, Vermont, United States. The population was 3,491 at the 2020 census. The town is home to Northern Vermont University-Johnson, a part the Vermont State Colleges system. The Vermont Studio Center is located in the village of Johnson. Since 1842, the town has been the home to Johnson Woolen Mills.

== Geography ==
Johnson is in the center of Lamoille County, in the valley of the Lamoille River, with the Green Mountains rising to the north and the south of the river. The village of Johnson is in the center of the town, where the Gihon River joins the Lamoille from the northeast. Vermont Route 15 crosses the center of the town, following the Lamoille River; the highway leads southeast 5 miles (8 km) to Hyde Park, the Lamoille County shire town, and west 9 miles (14 km) to Jeffersonville in the town of Cambridge. Vermont Route 100C leads northeast from Johnson village 4.5 miles (7.2 km) to Vermont Route 100 in North Hyde Park.

According to the United States Census Bureau, the town of Johnson has a total area of 45.1 square miles (116.8 km^{2}), of which 0.4 square miles (1.0 km^{2}), or 0.84%, are water.

=== Climate ===
Climate data for Johnson 2 N, Vermont, 1991–2020 normals, 2013-2020 snowfall: 980ft (299m)
Month	Jan	Feb	Mar	Apr	May	Jun	Jul	Aug	Sep	Oct	Nov	Dec	Year
Mean daily maximum °F (°C)	24.1 (−4.4)	27.6 (−2.4)	36.1 (2.3)	50.3 (10.2)	63.4 (17.4)	71.2 (21.8)	75.9 (24.4)	74.3 (23.5)	67.7 (19.8)	54.4 (12.4)	41.6 (5.3)	30.3 (−0.9)	51.4 (10.8)
Daily mean °F (°C)	14.4 (−9.8)	17.1 (−8.3)	26.3 (−3.2)	40.0 (4.4)	52.7 (11.5)	61.2 (16.2)	65.8 (18.8)	64.1 (17.8)	56.9 (13.8)	45.0 (7.2)	33.7 (0.9)	22.1 (−5.5)	41.6 (5.3)
Mean daily minimum °F (°C)	4.6 (−15.2)	6.6 (−14.1)	16.4 (−8.7)	29.7 (−1.3)	41.9 (5.5)	51.2 (10.7)	55.6 (13.1)	53.8 (12.1)	46.0 (7.8)	35.6 (2.0)	25.7 (−3.5)	13.9 (−10.1)	31.7 (−0.1)
Average precipitation inches (mm)	2.81 (71)	2.38 (60)	2.77 (70)	3.79 (96)	5.04 (128)	4.65 (118)	4.49 (114)	4.37 (111)	4.04 (103)	5.16 (131)	3.74 (95)	3.59 (91)	46.83 (1,188)
Average snowfall inches (cm)	24.0 (61)	30.6 (78)	22.7 (58)	6.0 (15)	0.8 (2.0)	0.0 (0.0)	0.0 (0.0)	0.0 (0.0)	0.0 (0.0)	0.6 (1.5)	14.5 (37)	20.0 (51)	119.2 (303.5)
Source 1: NOAA
Source 2: XMACIS (snowfall)

== Town name ==
The town is named for the American jurist, statesman and educator William Samuel Johnson. The town and a part of neighboring Cambridge were together known as the King's College Tract, having been created by a royal charter of British King George III in 1774. The King's College Tract was reserved for the eventual expansion of Kings College in New York, today's Columbia University. After the U.S. Declaration of Independence, Vermont's Council of Censors granted the town to Johnson in 1785.

== Demographics ==
Historical population
Census	Pop.	Note	%±
1790	93		—
1800	341		266.7%
1810	494		44.9%
1820	778		57.5%
1830	1,079		38.7%
1840	1,410		30.7%
1850	1,381		−2.1%
1860	1,526		10.5%
1870	1,558		2.1%
1880	1,495		−4.0%
1890	1,462		−2.2%
1900	1,391		−4.9%
1910	1,526		9.7%
1920	1,478		−3.1%
1930	1,378		−6.8%
1940	1,420		3.0%
1950	1,527		7.5%
1960	1,478		−3.2%
1970	1,927		30.4%
1980	2,581		33.9%
1990	3,156		22.3%
2000	3,274		3.7%
2010	3,446		5.3%
2020	3,491		1.3%
U.S. Decennial Census

As of the census of 2000, there were 3,274 people, 1,170 households, and 669 families residing in the town. The population density was 72.6 people per square mile (28.0/km^{2}). There were 1,263 housing units at an average density of 28.0 per square mile (10.8/km^{2}). The racial makeup of the town was 96.58% White, 0.61% Black or African American, 0.43% Native American, 0.67% Asian, 0.31% from other races, and 1.41% from two or more races. Hispanic or Latino of any race were 0.73% of the population.

There were 1,170 households, out of which 30.8% had children under the age of 18 living with them, 41.4% were couples living together and joined in either marriage or civil union, 10.8% had a female householder with no husband present, and 42.8% were non-families. 28.2% of all households were made up of individuals, and 8.5% had someone living alone who was 65 years of age or older. The average household size was 2.43 and the average family size was 2.99.

In the town, the population was spread out, with 21.6% under the age of 18, 26.4% from 18 to 24, 25.4% from 25 to 44, 18.2% from 45 to 64, and 8.5% who were 65 years of age or older. The median age was 26 years. For every 100 females, there were 103.7 males. For every 100 females age 18 and over, there were 102.2 males.

The median income for a household in the town was $31,343, and the median income for a family was $38,224. Males had a median income of $28,257 versus $20,610 for females. The per capita income for the town was $15,014. About 13.8% of families and 18.9% of the population were below the poverty line, including 21.6% of those under age 18 and 11.7% of those age 65 or over.

== Notable people ==
- Amalia Post (1836–1897), suffragist
- Julian A. Scott (1846–1901), Medal of Honor Recipient, Painter
- Victor Swenson (1936–2019), educator
