= Hardwick (CDP), Vermont =

Census-designated place in Vermont, United States

Hardwick, Vermont
- Census-designated place
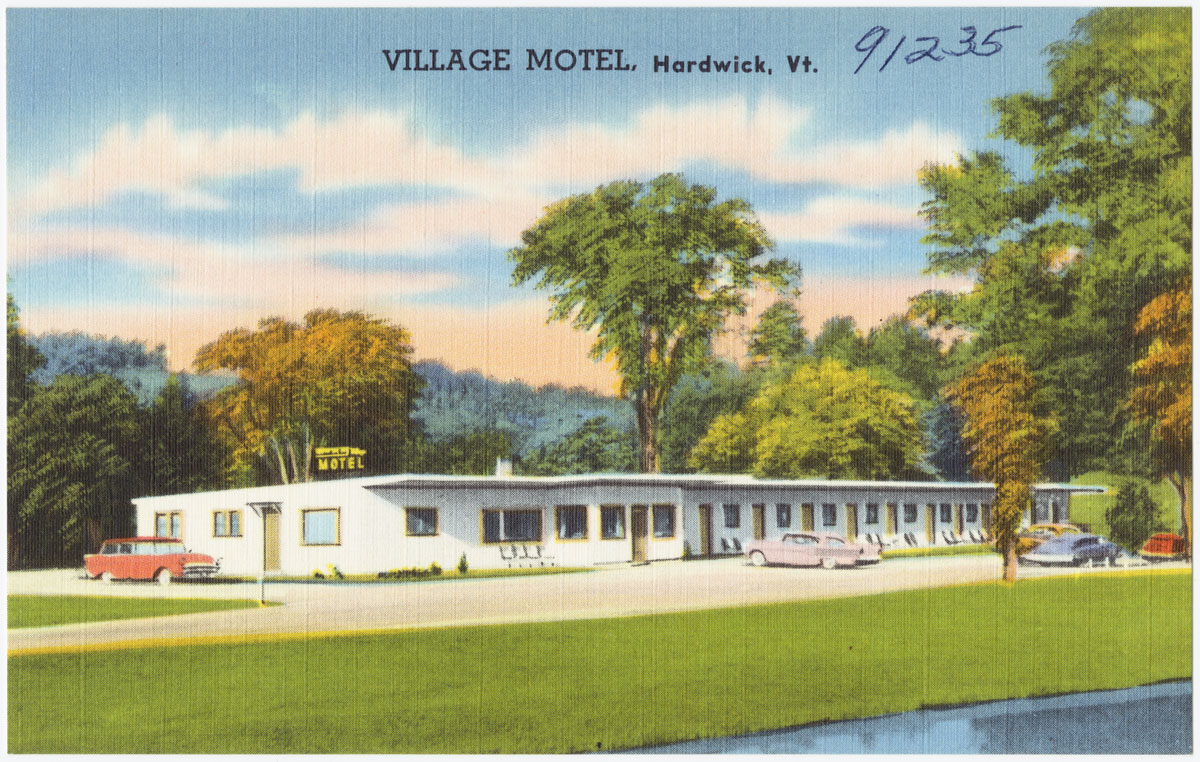
- Village Motel of Hardwick, 1930-1945

- Location within Vermont Location within the United States
- Coordinates: 44°30′16″N 72°22′20″W
- Country: United States
- State: Vermont
- County: Caledonia
- Town: Hardwick

Area
  - Total: 1.59 sq mi (4.11 km^{2})
  - Land: 1.57 sq mi (4.07 km^{2})
  - Water: 0.015 sq mi (0.04 km^{2})
- Elevation: 915 ft (279 m)

Population (2020)
  - Total: 1,269
- Time zone: UTC-5 (Eastern (EST))
  - Summer (DST): UTC-4 (EDT)
- ZIP Code: 05843
- Area code: 802
- FIPS code: 50-31750
- GNIS feature ID: 2586636

Hardwick is the primary village and a census-designated place (CDP) in the town of Hardwick, Caledonia County, Vermont, United States. As of the 2020 census, the CDP had a population of 1,269, out of 2,920 in the entire town of Hardwick.

== Geography ==
Hardwick village is in western Caledonia County, in the southern part of the town of Hardwick. Vermont Routes 14 and 15 pass through the village, joining to follow Wolcott Street north from the village center. Route 15 leads southeast 12 miles (19 km) to U.S. Route 2 in West Danville, and northwest 14 miles (23 km) to Morrisville, while Route 14 leads north 25 miles (40 km) to Irasburg and south 19 miles (31 km) to East Montpelier.

The Lamoille River flows through the center of Hardwick. It continues northwest to flow into Lake Champlain north of Colchester.
