= Johnson (village), Vermont =

Johnson, Vermont
- Village
- Location in Vermont Location in the United States
- Coordinates: 44°38′12″N 72°40′43″W
- Country: United States
- State: Vermont
- County: Lamoille
- Town: Johnson

Area
  - Total: 1.22 sq mi (3.16 km^{2})
  - Land: 1.17 sq mi (3.02 km^{2})
  - Water: 0.054 sq mi (0.14 km^{2})
- Elevation: 499 ft (152 m)

Population (2020)
  - Total: 1,332
  - Density: 1,140/sq mi (441/km^{2})
- Time zone: UTC-5 (Eastern (EST))
  - Summer (DST): UTC-4 (EDT)
- ZIP code: 05656
- Area code: 802
- FIPS code: 50-37000
- GNIS feature ID: 2378311
- Website: https://villageofjohnson.com/

Johnson is a village in the town of Johnson in Lamoille County, Vermont, United States. The population was 1,332 at the 2020 census.

== Geography ==
According to the United States Census Bureau, the village has a total area of 1.2 square miles (3.2 km^{2}), all land.

== Demographics ==
Historical population
| Census | Pop. | Note | %± |
|---|---|---|---|
| 1900 | 587 | | — |
| 1910 | 651 | | 10.9% |
| 1920 | 681 | | 4.6% |
| 1930 | 659 | | −3.2% |
| 1940 | 753 | | 14.3% |
| 1950 | 900 | | 19.5% |
| 1960 | 941 | | 4.6% |
| 1970 | 1,296 | | 37.7% |
| 1980 | 1,393 | | 7.5% |
| 1990 | 1,470 | | 5.5% |
| 2000 | 1,420 | | −3.4% |
| 2010 | 1,443 | | 1.6% |
| 2020 | 1,332 | | −7.7% |
U.S. Decennial Census

As of the census of 2000, there were 1,420 people, 469 households, and 186 families residing in the village. The population density was 1,166.9 people per square mile (449.4/km^{2}). There were 494 housing units at an average density of 406.0/sq mi (156.3/km^{2}). The racial makeup of the village was 95.63% White, 0.92% Black or African American, 0.07% Native American, 1.34% Asian, 0.28% from other races, and 1.76% from two or more races. Hispanic or Latino of any race were 1.06% of the population.

There were 469 households, out of which 20.9% had children under the age of 18 living with them, 25.6% were married couples living together, 10.9% had a female householder with no husband present, and 60.3% were non-families. 39.4% of all households were made up of individuals, and 12.6% had someone living alone who was 65 years of age or older. The average household size was 2.11 and the average family size was 2.88.

In the village, the population was spread out, with 13.2% under the age of 18, 46.4% from 18 to 24, 20.1% from 25 to 44, 11.9% from 45 to 64, and 8.4% who were 65 years of age or older. The median age was 22 years. For every 100 females, there were 99.7 males. For every 100 females age 18 and over, there were 100.8 males.

The median income for a household in the village was $23,846, and the median income for a family was $40,089. Males had a median income of $25,104 versus $19,861 for females. The per capita income for the village was $11,651. About 8.3% of families and 23.6% of the population were below the poverty line, including 18.8% of those under age 18 and 15.4% of those age 65 or over.
