= Hyde Park (village), Vermont =

Hyde Park, Vermont
- Village
- Logo

- Location in Vermont Location in the United States
- Coordinates: 44°45′49″N 72°36′54″W
- Country: United States
- State: Vermont
- County: Lamoille
- Town: Hyde Park

Area
  - Total: 1.16 sq mi (3.01 km^{2})
  - Land: 1.16 sq mi (3.00 km^{2})
  - Water: 0.0039 sq mi (0.01 km^{2})
- Elevation: 745 ft (227 m)

Population (2020)
  - Total: 410
  - Density: 350/sq mi (140/km^{2})
- Time zone: UTC-5 (Eastern (EST))
  - Summer (DST): UTC-4 (EDT)
- ZIP code: 05655
- Area code: 802
- FIPS code: 50-34975
- GNIS feature ID: 2378307
- Website: www.villageofhydepark.com

Hyde Park is a village in the town of town of Hyde Park, Lamoille County, Vermont, United States. The village population was 410 at the 2020 census.

== Geography ==
According to the United States Census Bureau, the village has a total area of 1.2 square miles (3.0 km^{2}), all land.

== Demographics ==
Historical population
Census	Pop.	Note	%±
1880	331		—
1900	422		—
1910	423		0.2%
1920	368		−13.0%
1930	313		−14.9%
1940	330		5.4%
1950	440		33.3%
1960	474		7.7%
1970	418		−11.8%
1980	475		13.6%
1990	457		−3.8%
2000	415		−9.2%
2010	462		11.3%
2020	410		−11.3%
U.S. Decennial Census

As of the census of 2000, there were 415 people, 192 households, and 111 families residing in the village. The population density was 355.7 people per square mile (137.0/km^{2}). There were 207 housing units at an average density of 177.4/sq mi (68.3/km^{2}). The racial makeup of the village was 98.55% White, 0.96% Black or African American, 0.24% Asian, and 0.24% from two or more races. Hispanic or Latino of any race were 0.48% of the population.

There were 192 households, out of which 23.4% had children under the age of 18 living with them, 45.3% were married couples living together, 9.4% had a female householder with no husband present, and 41.7% were non-families. 34.4% of all households were made up of individuals, and 11.5% had someone living alone who was 65 years of age or older. The average household size was 2.16 and the average family size was 2.75.

In the village, the population was spread out, with 19.8% under the age of 18, 6.7% from 18 to 24, 25.8% from 25 to 44, 29.6% from 45 to 64, and 18.1% who were 65 years of age or older. The median age was 44 years. For every 100 females, there were 92.1 males. For every 100 females age 18 and over, there were 85.0 males.

The median income for a household in the village was $35,781, and the median income for a family was $50,000. Males had a median income of $35,357 versus $26,016 for females. The per capita income for the village was $22,790. About 2.0% of families and 5.6% of the population were below the poverty line, including 5.5% of those under age 18 and 6.8% of those age 65 or over.

== See also ==
- List of municipalities in Vermont
- North Hyde Park, Vermont
