= 1948 United States presidential election in Vermont =

- November 2, 1948
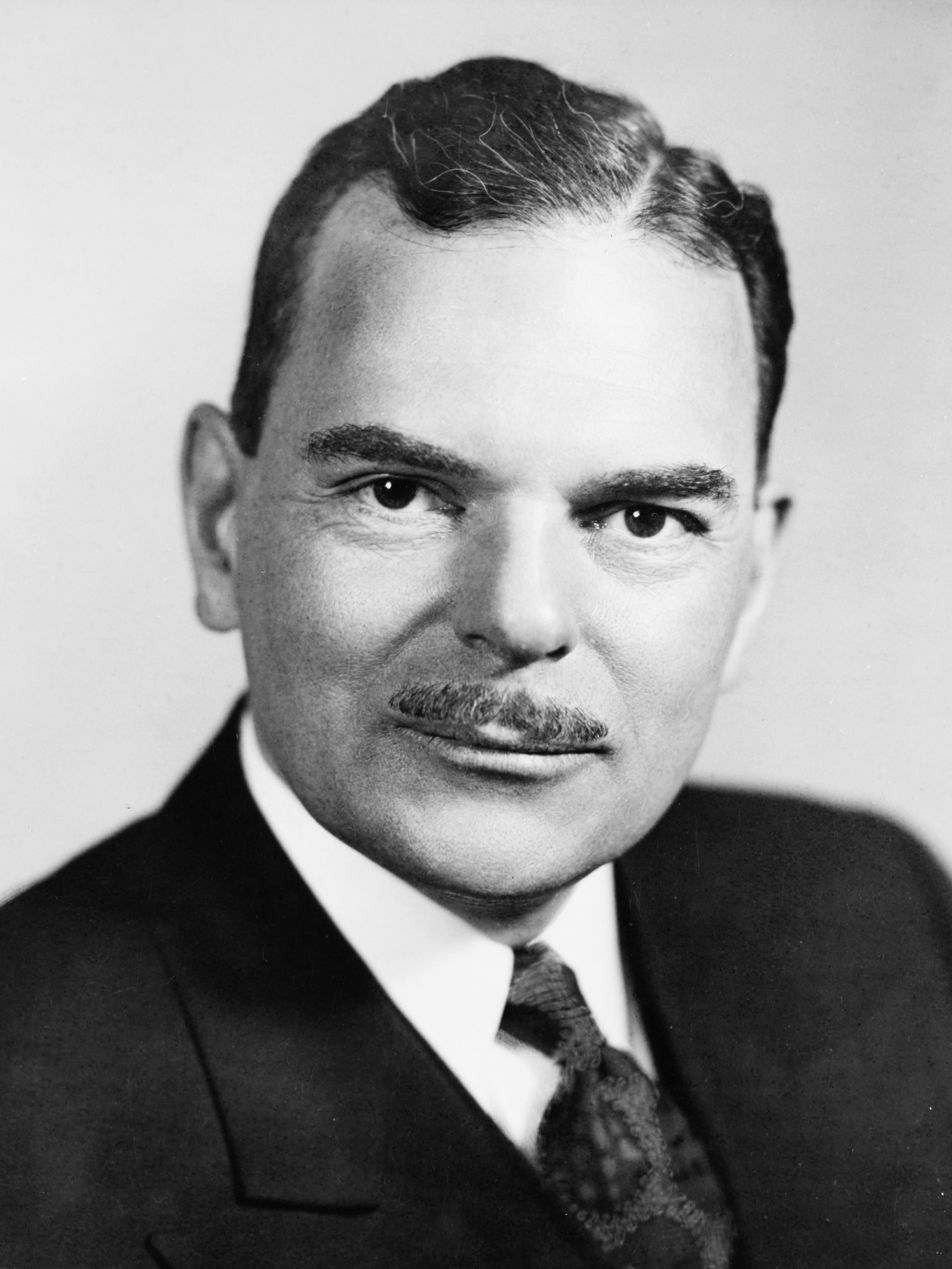

Nominee	Thomas E. Dewey	Harry S. Truman
Party	Republican	Democratic
Home state	New York	Missouri
Running mate	Earl Warren	Alben W. Barkley
Electoral vote	3	0
Popular vote	75,926	45,557
Percentage	61.54%	36.92%

Dewey
40–50%
50–60%
60–70%
70–80%
80–90%
90–100%
Truman
50–60%
60–70%
80–90%
President before election
Harry S. Truman
Democratic
Elected President
Harry S. Truman
Democratic

The 1948 United States presidential election in Vermont took place on November 2, 1948, as part of the 1948 United States presidential election which was held throughout all contemporary 48 states. Voters chose three representatives, or electors to the Electoral College, who voted for president and vice president.

Vermont voted for the Republican nominee, former Governor Thomas E. Dewey of New York, over the Democratic nominee, incumbent President Harry S. Truman of Missouri. Dewey's running mate was Governor Earl Warren of California, while Truman ran with Senator Alben W. Barkley of Kentucky.

Dewey took a landslide 61.54% of the vote to Truman's 36.92%, a victory margin of 24.61%. Progressive Party candidate Henry A. Wallace came in a distant third, with 1.04%.

Vermont historically was a bastion of Northeastern Republicanism, and by 1948 Vermont had gone Republican in every presidential election since the founding of the Republican Party. From 1856 to 1944, Vermont had had the longest streak of voting Republican of any state, having never voted Democratic before, and this tradition easily continued in 1948 with Dewey's decisive win.

Vermont had been one of only two states (along with nearby Maine) to reject Democrat Franklin D. Roosevelt in all 4 of his presidential campaigns, even in the nationwide Democratic landslides of 1932 and 1936. Nevertheless, FDR had improved dramatically on previous Democrats’ performances in Vermont, and in an opposite trend of the nation, had been more Democratic in the 1940s than in either of the 1930s landslides, with Roosevelt coming within just under 10 points of winning Vermont in 1940. Thus Dewey's decisive win with 61.54% marked the first time since 1928 that a Republican broke sixty percent of the vote in Vermont. With 61.54% of the popular vote, Vermont was his strongest victory in the nation.

Dewey carried eleven of the state's 14 counties, breaking 60% in 9, and 70% in 5 of these. However, the three northwestern counties of Vermont had been Democratic enclaves in an otherwise Republican state throughout the 1930s and 1940s, and Truman once again won Chittenden County, Franklin County and Grand Isle County for the Democrats. Dewey did win back sparsely populated Essex County, in the northeast of the state, which had defected to the Democrats and voted for Roosevelt in 1940 and 1944.

== Results ==
1948 United States presidential election in Vermont
Party	Candidate	Votes	Percentage	Electoral votes
Republican	Thomas E. Dewey	75,926	61.54%	3
Democratic	Harry S. Truman (incumbent)	45,557	36.92%	0
Progressive	Henry A. Wallace	1,279	1.04%	0
Socialist	Norman Thomas	585	0.47%	0
N/A	Write-ins	35	0.03%	0
Totals		123,382	100.00%	3

=== Results by county ===
County	Thomas E. Dewey Republican		Harry S. Truman Democratic		Henry A. Wallace Progressive		Other candidates Various parties		Margin		Total votes cast
County	#	%	#	%	#	%	#	%	#	%	Total votes cast
Addison	4,148	70.68%	1,615	27.52%	62	1.06%	44	0.75%	2,533	43.16%	5,869
Bennington	5,840	62.30%	3,340	35.63%	110	1.17%	84	0.90%	2,500	26.67%	9,374
Caledonia	5,873	68.75%	2,585	30.26%	57	0.67%	27	0.32%	3,288	38.49%	8,542
Chittenden	8,509	47.97%	8,903	50.19%	250	1.41%	77	0.43%	-394	-2.22%	17,739
Essex	1,055	54.21%	881	45.27%	5	0.26%	5	0.26%	174	8.94%	1,946
Franklin	4,897	46.89%	5,455	52.23%	63	0.60%	29	0.28%	-558	-5.34%	10,444
Grand Isle	724	46.32%	822	52.59%	13	0.83%	4	0.26%	-98	-6.27%	1,563
Lamoille	2,344	73.69%	816	25.65%	11	0.35%	10	0.31%	1,528	48.04%	3,181
Orange	4,061	76.97%	1,139	21.59%	56	1.06%	20	0.38%	2,922	55.38%	5,276
Orleans	3,775	62.87%	2,204	36.71%	10	0.17%	15	0.25%	1,571	26.17%	6,004
Rutland	10,206	60.56%	6,452	38.28%	122	0.72%	73	0.43%	3,754	22.27%	16,853
Washington	7,720	59.92%	4,839	37.56%	234	1.82%	90	0.70%	2,881	22.36%	12,883
Windham	7,148	70.49%	2,770	27.32%	144	1.42%	78	0.77%	4,378	43.18%	10,140
Windsor	9,626	70.95%	3,736	27.54%	142	1.05%	64	0.47%	5,890	43.41%	13,568
Total	75,926	61.54%	45,557	36.92%	1,279	1.04%	620	0.50%	30,369	24.61%	123,382

==== Counties that flipped from Democratic to Republican ====
- Essex

== See also ==
- United States presidential elections in Vermont
