= 1952 United States presidential election in Vermont =

- November 4, 1952

| Nominee | Dwight D. Eisenhower | Adlai Stevenson |
| Party | Republican | Democratic |
| Home state | New York | Illinois |
| Running mate | Richard Nixon | John Sparkman |
| Electoral vote | 3 | 0 |
| Popular vote | 109,717 | 43,355 |
| Percentage | 71.45% | 28.23% |

Eisenhower
50–60%
60–70%
70–80%
80–90%
90–100%
Stevenson
50–60%
60–70%
70–80%
President before election
Harry S. Truman
Democratic
Elected President
Dwight D. Eisenhower
Republican

The 1952 United States presidential election in Vermont took place on November 4, 1952, as part of the 1952 United States presidential election which was held throughout all contemporary 48 states. Voters chose three representatives, or electors to the Electoral College, who voted for the president and vice president.

Vermont voted overwhelmingly for the Republican nominee, General Dwight D. Eisenhower of New York, over the Democratic nominee, former Illinois Governor Adlai Stevenson of Illinois. Eisenhower ran with Senator Richard Nixon of California, while Stevenson's running mate was Senator John Sparkman of Alabama.

Eisenhower took a landslide 71.45% of the vote to Stevenson's 28.23%, a victory margin of 43.22%. Vermont historically was a bastion of Northeastern Republicanism, and by 1952 Vermont had gone Republican in every presidential election since the founding of the Republican Party. From 1856 to 1948, Vermont had had the longest streak of voting Republican of any state, having never voted Democratic before, and this tradition easily continued in 1952 with Eisenhower's landslide win.

Even as Eisenhower won a comfortable victory nationally, Vermont weighed in as a whopping 32% more Republican than the national average and with 71.45% of the popular vote, this made Vermont the most Republican in the union in the 1952 election.

Eisenhower, a war hero and moderate Republican who had pledged to maintain popular New Deal Democratic policies, had wide appeal beyond the boundaries of the traditional Republican coalition. While Vermont was one of the only two states in the nation (along with Maine) to vote against Franklin Roosevelt all 4 times, the GOP margins in the state had narrowed substantially in the 1930s and 1940s, particularly due to the strong Democratic presence in the northwestern part of the state. However, Eisenhower's unique personal appeal brought even that region back into the GOP coalition, and allowed him to break 70% in the state in both 1952 and 1956 (Eisenhower's would win with a slightly larger margin in 1956), the first Republican to do so since Calvin Coolidge in 1924, and the last to date.

== Results ==
1952 United States presidential election in Vermont
| Party | Candidate | Votes | Percentage | Electoral votes |
|---|---|---|---|---|
| Republican | Dwight D. Eisenhower | 109,717 | 71.45% | 3 |
| Democratic | Adlai Stevenson | 43,355 | 28.23% | 0 |
| Progressive | Vincent Hallinan | 282 | 0.18% | 0 |
| Socialist | Darlington Hoopes | 185 | 0.12% | 0 |
| N/A | Write-ins | 18 | 0.01% | 0 |
| Totals | | 153,557 | 100.00% | 3 |

=== Results by county ===
| County | Dwight D. Eisenhower Republican | | Adlai Stevenson Democratic | | Various candidates Other parties | | Margin | | Total votes cast |
| County | # | % | # | % | # | % | # | % | Total votes cast |
|---|---|---|---|---|---|---|---|---|---|
| Addison | 6,057 | 78.18% | 1,667 | 21.52% | 24 | 0.31% | 4,390 | 56.66% | 7,748 |
| Bennington | 8,385 | 73.31% | 3,018 | 26.39% | 34 | 0.30% | 5,367 | 46.92% | 11,437 |
| Caledonia | 7,595 | 80.60% | 1,807 | 19.18% | 21 | 0.22% | 5,788 | 61.42% | 9,423 |
| Chittenden | 13,533 | 57.87% | 9,746 | 41.68% | 106 | 0.45% | 3,787 | 16.19% | 23,385 |
| Essex | 1,592 | 69.04% | 705 | 30.57% | 9 | 0.39% | 887 | 38.47% | 2,306 |
| Franklin | 6,949 | 57.82% | 5,018 | 41.75% | 51 | 0.42% | 1,931 | 16.07% | 12,018 |
| Grand Isle | 976 | 59.15% | 665 | 40.30% | 9 | 0.55% | 311 | 18.85% | 1,650 |
| Lamoille | 3,516 | 84.52% | 633 | 15.22% | 11 | 0.26% | 2,883 | 69.30% | 4,160 |
| Orange | 5,610 | 83.49% | 1,082 | 16.10% | 27 | 0.40% | 4,528 | 67.39% | 6,719 |
| Orleans | 5,830 | 74.19% | 2,003 | 25.49% | 25 | 0.32% | 3,827 | 48.70% | 7,858 |
| Rutland | 13,980 | 69.95% | 5,970 | 29.87% | 36 | 0.18% | 8,010 | 40.08% | 19,986 |
| Washington | 11,979 | 72.59% | 4,460 | 27.03% | 64 | 0.39% | 7,519 | 45.56% | 16,503 |
| Windham | 9,774 | 77.60% | 2,790 | 22.15% | 31 | 0.25% | 6,984 | 55.45% | 12,595 |
| Windsor | 13,941 | 78.46% | 3,791 | 21.33% | 37 | 0.21% | 10,150 | 57.13% | 17,769 |
| Totals | 109,717 | 71.45% | 43,355 | 28.23% | 485 | 0.32% | 66,362 | 43.22% | 153,557 |

==== Counties flipped from Democratic to Republican ====
- Chittenden
- Franklin
- Grand Isle

== Analysis ==
Eisenhower swept every county in Vermont, breaking 70% in 9 of the 14 counties. The three northwestern counties of Vermont had long been Democratic enclaves in an otherwise Republican state through the 1930s and 1940s, but Eisenhower finally won them back for the GOP. The region still remained the most Democratic in the state, as Eisenhower received less than 60% of the vote in Chittenden County, Franklin County and Grand Isle County, while every county outside the northwest broke 60% for Eisenhower and three broke 80%.

== See also ==
- United States presidential elections in Vermont
