= 1956 United States presidential election in Vermont =

- November 6, 1956

Nominee	Dwight D. Eisenhower	Adlai Stevenson
Party	Republican	Democratic
Home state	Pennsylvania (Note: Although he was born in Texas and grew up in Kansas before his military career, at the time of the 1952 election Eisenhower was president of Columbia University and was, officially, a resident of New York. During his first term as president, he moved his private residence to Gettysburg, Pennsylvania, and officially changed his residency to Pennsylvania.)	Illinois
Running mate	Richard Nixon	Estes Kefauver
Electoral vote	3	0
Popular vote	110,390	42,549
Percentage	72.16%	27.81%

Eisenhower
50–60%
60–70%
70–80%
80–90%
90–100%
Stevenson
50–60%
60–70%
70–80%
President before election
Dwight D. Eisenhower
Republican
Elected President
Dwight D. Eisenhower
Republican

The 1956 United States presidential election in Vermont took place on November 6, 1956, as part of the 1956 United States presidential election which was held throughout all contemporary 48 states. Voters chose three representatives, or electors to the Electoral College, who voted for president and vice president.

Vermont voted overwhelmingly for the Republican nominee, incumbent President Dwight D. Eisenhower of Pennsylvania, over the Democratic nominee, former Illinois Governor Adlai Stevenson. Eisenhower ran with incumbent Vice President Richard Nixon of California, while Stevenson's running mate was Senator Estes Kefauver of Tennessee.

Eisenhower took a landslide 72.16% of the vote to Stevenson's 27.81%, a victory margin of 44.35%. This was the most lopsided statewide win of the election. Vermont historically was a bastion of Northeastern Republicanism, and by 1956 Vermont had gone Republican in every presidential election since the founding of the Republican Party. From 1856 to 1952, Vermont had had the longest streak of voting Republican of any state, having never voted Democratic before, and this tradition easily continued in 1956 with Eisenhower's landslide win.

Eisenhower, a war hero and moderate Republican who had pledged to reform and maintain popular New Deal Democratic policies, had wide appeal beyond the boundaries of the traditional Republican coalition. While Vermont had been one of the only two states (the other being Maine) in the nation to vote against Franklin Roosevelt all 4 times, the GOP margins in the state had narrowed substantially in the 1930s and 1940s, particularly due to the strong Democratic presence in the northwestern part of the state. However Eisenhower's unique personal appeal brought even that region back into the GOP coalition, and allowed him to break 70% in the state in both 1952 and 1956 (where Eisenhower had performed better than he did in 1952), the first Republican to do so since Calvin Coolidge in 1924, and the last Republican to date.

== Results ==
1956 United States presidential election in Vermont
Party	Candidate	Votes	Percentage	Electoral votes
Republican	Dwight D. Eisenhower (incumbent)	110,390	72.16%	3
Democratic	Adlai Stevenson	42,549	27.81%	0
No party	Write-ins	39	0.03%	0
Totals		152,978	100.00%	3

=== Results by county ===
County	Dwight D. Eisenhower Republican		Adlai Stevenson Democratic		Various candidates Write-ins		Margin		Total votes cast
County	#	%	#	%	#	%	#	%	Total votes cast
Addison	5,990	78.22%	1,668	21.78%			4,322	56.44%	7,658
Bennington	8,434	75.59%	2,719	24.37%	4	0.04%	5,715	51.22%	11,157
Caledonia	7,560	81.26%	1,744	18.74%			5,816	62.52%	9,304
Chittenden	14,108	57.39%	10,474	42.61%			3,634	14.78%	24,582
Essex	1,714	70.42%	719	29.54%	1	0.04%	995	40.88%	2,434
Franklin	7,125	59.55%	4,840	40.45%			2,285	19.10%	11,965
Grand Isle	978	61.82%	604	38.18%			374	23.64%	1,582
Lamoille	3,464	83.63%	678	16.37%			2,786	67.26%	4,142
Orange	5,616	83.95%	1,072	16.02%	2	0.03%	4,544	67.93%	6,690
Orleans	5,344	72.26%	2,052	27.74%			3,292	44.52%	7,396
Rutland	14,570	73.83%	5,165	26.17%			9,405	47.66%	19,735
Washington	11,351	71.50%	4,520	28.47%	5	0.03%	6,831	43.03%	15,876
Windham	9,979	79.99%	2,474	19.83%	22	0.18%	7,505	60.16%	12,475
Windsor	14,157	78.73%	3,820	21.24%	5	0.03%	10,337	57.49%	17,982
Totals	110,390	72.16%	42,549	27.81%	39	0.03%	67,841	44.35%	152,978

== Analysis ==
Eisenhower swept every county in Vermont, breaking 70% in 11 of the 14 counties. The three northwestern counties of Vermont had long been Democratic enclaves in an otherwise Republican state through the 1930s and 1940s, but Eisenhower won them back for the GOP in both 1952 and 1956, in the latter case even breaking 60% in Grand Isle County. The region still remained the most Democratic in the state, as Eisenhower received less than 60% of the vote in Chittenden County and Franklin County, while every county outside the northwest broke seventy percent for Eisenhower. In three counties Eisenhower even broke eighty percent of the vote, which, as of 2024, no other candidate has managed to do since. No presidential candidate since has surpassed Eisenhower's 72.16% vote share or his 44.35% margin of victory, as by the late 1950s cracks were already beginning to form in the Republican stranglehold on Vermont, and the GOP shifted toward an increasingly Southern and conservative party beginning in the 1960s.

Even as Eisenhower won a decisive re-election landslide nationally, Vermont weighed in as a whopping 29% more Republican than the national average, making Vermont the most Republican state in the union in the 1956 election. While Vermont had been the most Republican state in the nation in many elections prior to 1956, this would prove the last election when Vermont would hold that title.

This would be the last time Vermont was the strongest state for either party until 64 years later, in 2020, when it was Democratic candidate Joe Biden's strongest state, demonstrating the completion of Vermont's trend towards the Democrats.

== See also ==
- United States presidential elections in Vermont
