= 1920 United States presidential election in Vermont =

- November 2, 1920
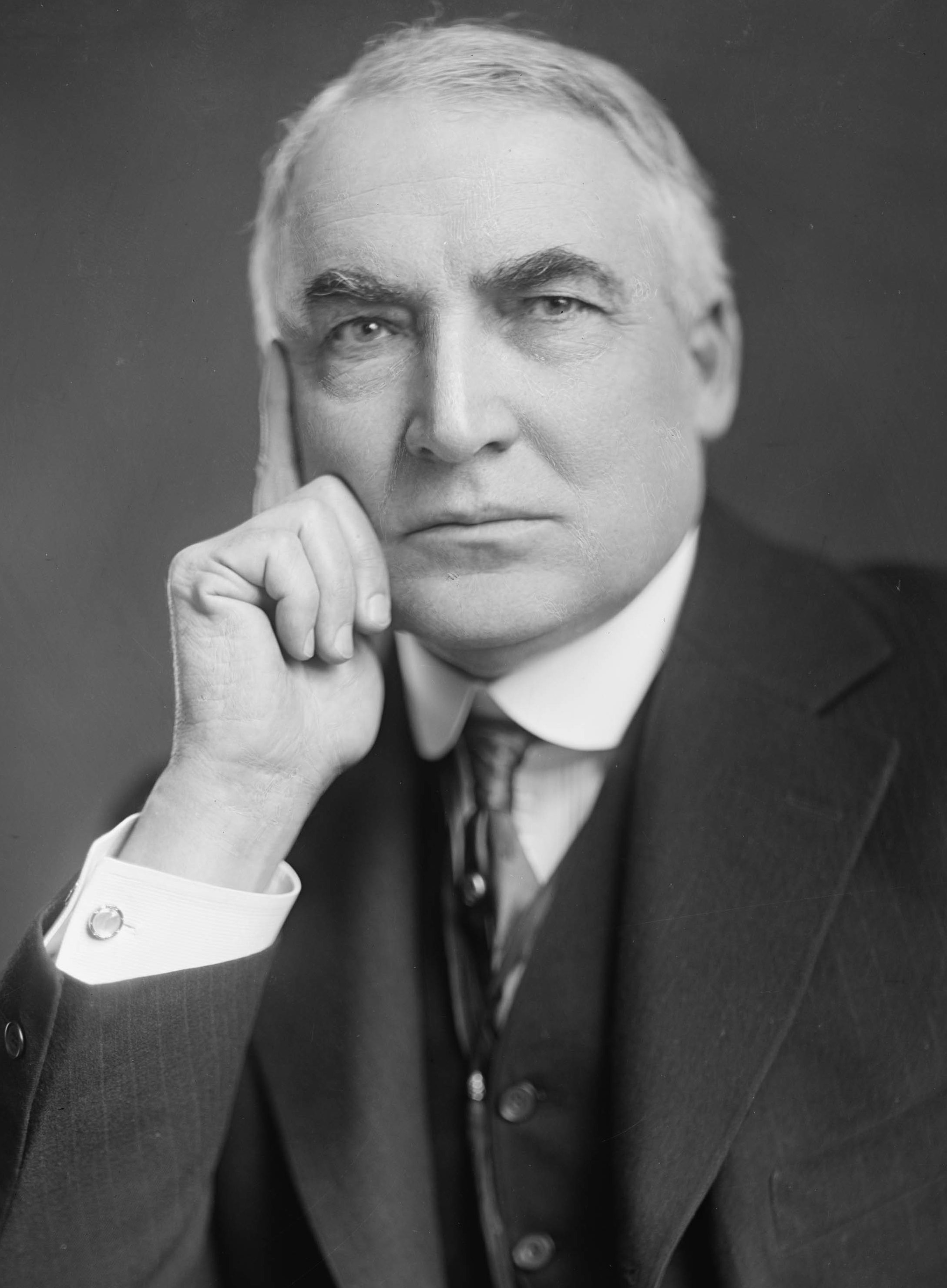

Nominee	Warren G. Harding	James M. Cox
Party	Republican	Democratic
Home state	Ohio	Ohio
Running mate	Calvin Coolidge	Franklin D. Roosevelt
Electoral vote	4	0
Popular vote	68,212	20,919
Percentage	75.82%	23.25%

Harding
50–60%
60–70%
70–80%
80–90%
90–100%
Cox
50–60%
President before election
Woodrow Wilson
Democratic
Elected President
Warren G. Harding
Republican

The 1920 United States presidential election in Vermont took place on November 2, 1920, as part of the 1920 United States presidential election which was held throughout all contemporary 48 states. Voters chose four representatives, or electors to the Electoral College, who voted for president and vice president.

Vermont voted overwhelmingly for the Republican nominee, Ohio Senator Warren G. Harding, over the Democratic nominee, Ohio Governor James M. Cox. Harding ran with Massachusetts Governor Calvin Coolidge, while Cox ran with Assistant Secretary of the Navy Franklin D. Roosevelt of New York.

Harding won in a massive landslide, taking 75.82% of the vote, while Cox took 23.25%, a Republican victory margin of 52.57%.

Vermont historically was a bastion of Northeastern Republicanism, and by 1920 it had gone Republican in every presidential election since the founding of the Republican Party. From 1856 to 1916, Vermont maintained the longest streak of voting Republican of any state, having never voted Democratic before, and this tradition easily continued amidst the nationwide Republican landslide in 1920.

Harding was also helped in the state by the local popularity of his running mate, Calvin Coolidge, a traditional New England Yankee born in the small town of Plymouth Notch, Vermont, who had started his political career nearby as Governor of Massachusetts.

Harding swept every county in Vermont by landslide margins, including winning back Grand Isle County, which had previously gone to Woodrow Wilson in both 1912 and 1916. Harding took more than sixty percent of the vote in all fourteen, broke seventy percent of the vote in eleven counties, and even broke eighty percent in five.

Vermont would be the third most Republican state in the union in terms of victory margin, and the second most Republican state in terms of vote share after North Dakota. Vermont would weigh in as over 26% more Republican than the national average in the 1920 election.

== Results ==
1920 United States presidential election in Vermont
Party	Candidate	Votes	Percentage	Electoral votes
Republican	Warren G. Harding	68,212	75.82%	4
Democratic	James M. Cox	20,919	23.25%	0
Prohibition	Aaron S. Watkins	774	0.86%	0
N/A	Write-ins	56	0.06%	0
Totals		89,961	100.00%	4

=== Results by county ===
	Warren G. Harding Republican		James M. Cox Democratic		Various candidates Other parties		Margin		Total votes cast
County	#	%	#	%	#	%	#	%	#
Addison	4,515	88.93%	503	9.91%	59	1.16%	4,012	79.02%	5,077
Bennington	4,172	71.43%	1,615	27.65%	54	0.92%	2,557	43.78%	5,841
Caledonia	5,537	75.85%	1,694	23.21%	69	0.95%	3,843	52.64%	7,300
Chittenden	7,215	66.41%	3,564	32.80%	86	0.79%	3,651	33.60%	10,865
Essex	1,243	68.90%	552	30.60%	9	0.50%	691	38.30%	1,804
Franklin	4,869	66.72%	2,342	32.09%	87	1.19%	2,527	34.63%	7,298
Grand Isle	928	71.60%	354	27.31%	14	1.08%	574	44.29%	1,296
Lamoille	2,311	82.07%	458	16.26%	47	1.67%	1,853	65.80%	2,816
Orange	3,713	78.93%	938	19.94%	53	1.13%	2,775	58.99%	4,704
Orleans	4,400	84.99%	738	14.26%	39	0.75%	3,662	70.74%	5,177
Rutland	8,940	73.10%	3,192	26.10%	97	0.79%	5,748	47.00%	12,229
Washington	6,418	75.76%	1,953	23.06%	100	1.18%	4,465	52.71%	8,471
Windham	5,551	80.36%	1,302	18.85%	55	0.80%	4,249	61.51%	6,908
Windsor	8,400	82.56%	1,714	16.85%	61	0.60%	6,686	65.71%	10,175
Totals	68,212	75.82%	20,919	23.25%	830	0.92%	47,293	52.57%	89,961

==== Counties that flipped from Democratic to Republican ====
- Grand Isle

== See also ==
- United States presidential elections in Vermont
