= 1944 United States presidential election in Vermont =

- November 7, 1944

Nominee	Thomas E. Dewey	Franklin D. Roosevelt
Party	Republican	Democratic
Home state	New York	New York
Running mate	John W. Bricker	Harry S. Truman
Electoral vote	3	0
Popular vote	71,527	53,820
Percentage	57.06%	42.93%

Dewey
50–60%
60–70%
70–80%
80–90%
90–100%
Roosevelt
50–60%
60–70%
70–80%
80–90%
President before election
Franklin D. Roosevelt
Democratic
Elected President
Franklin D. Roosevelt
Democratic

The 1944 United States presidential election in Vermont took place on November 7, 1944, as part of the 1944 United States presidential election which was held throughout all 48 states. Voters chose three representatives, or electors to the Electoral College, who voted for president and vice president.

Vermont voted for the Republican nominee, former Governor Thomas E. Dewey of New York, over the Democratic nominee, incumbent President Franklin D. Roosevelt of New York. Dewey's running mate was Governor John W. Bricker of Ohio, while Roosevelt ran with Senator Harry S. Truman of Missouri.

Dewey took 57.06% of the vote, to Roosevelt's 42.93%, a margin of 14.12%.

Vermont historically was a bastion of Northeastern Republicanism, and by 1944 it had gone Republican in every presidential election since the founding of the Republican Party. From 1856 to 1940, Vermont had the longest streak of voting Republican of any state, having never voted Democratic before, and this tradition continued in 1944 with Dewey's decisive win.

Vermont had been one of only two states (along with nearby Maine) to reject Democrat Franklin D. Roosevelt in all four of his presidential campaigns, even in the nationwide Democratic landslides of 1932 and 1936.

However 1940 had been Roosevelt's high point in Vermont. In 1940, Roosevelt had improved on his previous showings in Vermont, coming within 10 points of winning the state, and thus Dewey's more comfortable win in 1944 represented a shift back toward the GOP. Dewey's 57.06% of the popular vote in Vermont made it his fourth strongest state after Kansas, Nebraska and South Dakota.

Dewey carried ten of the state's 14 counties, breaking 60% in 6 and 70% in Orange. However, the three northwestern counties of Vermont had been Democratic enclaves in an otherwise Republican state throughout the 1930s and 1940s, and Roosevelt once again won Chittenden County, Franklin County and Grand Isle County for the Democrats. Roosevelt also once again carried rural Essex County in the northeast of the state, as he had first done 4 years earlier. Roosevelt also remains the most recent Democratic president to win more than one term without carrying Vermont once. This also marks the last time Vermont would be carried by a different candidate from neighboring New Hampshire until 2000.

== Results ==
1944 United States presidential election in Vermont
Party	Candidate	Votes	Percentage	Electoral votes
Republican	Thomas E. Dewey	71,527	57.06%	3
Democratic	Franklin D. Roosevelt (incumbent)	53,820	42.93%	0
N/A	Write-ins	14	0.01%	0
Totals		125,361	100.00%	3

=== Results by county ===
County	Thomas Edmund Dewey Republican		Franklin Delano Roosevelt Democratic		Various candidates Other parties		Margin		Total votes cast
County	#	%	#	%	#	%	#	%	Total votes cast
Addison	4,097	66.25%	2,079	33.62%	8	0.13%	2,018	32.63%	6,184
Bennington	5,252	58.61%	3,709	41.39%			1,543	17.22%	8,961
Caledonia	5,086	64.46%	2,804	35.54%			2,282	28.92%	7,890
Chittenden	7,513	41.05%	10,788	58.95%			-3,275	-17.90%	18,301
Essex	1,064	48.58%	1,126	51.42%			-62	-2.83%	2,190
Franklin	4,374	42.01%	6,036	57.98%	1	0.01%	-1,662	-15.96%	10,411
Grand Isle	667	45.44%	801	54.56%			-134	-9.13%	1,468
Lamoille	2,212	68.21%	1,031	31.79%			1,181	36.42%	3,243
Orange	4,117	73.77%	1,464	26.23%			2,653	47.54%	5,581
Orleans	3,801	58.86%	2,657	41.14%			1,144	17.71%	6,458
Rutland	9,544	57.30%	7,111	42.70%			2,433	14.61%	16,655
Washington	7,162	55.47%	5,749	44.53%			1,413	10.94%	12,911
Windham	6,708	66.49%	3,376	33.46%	5	0.05%	3,332	33.03%	10,089
Windsor	9,930	66.12%	5,089	33.88%			4,841	32.23%	15,019
Totals	71,527	57.06%	53,820	42.93%	14	0.01%	17,707	14.12%	125,361

== See also ==
- United States presidential elections in Vermont
