= 2024 United States presidential election in Vermont =

- November 5, 2024
- Turnout: 72.12% (▼1.15 pp)

Nominee	Kamala Harris	Donald Trump
Party	Democratic	Republican
Home state	California	Florida
Running mate	Tim Walz	JD Vance
Electoral vote	3	0
Popular vote	235,791	119,395
Percentage	63.83%	32.32%

Harris
40–50%
50–60%
60–70%
70–80%
80–90%
Trump
40–50%
50–60%
60–70%
Tie/No data
President before election
Joe Biden
Democratic
Elected President
Donald Trump
Republican

The 2024 United States presidential election in Vermont took place on Tuesday, November 5, 2024, as part of the 2024 United States elections. Vermont voters chose electors to represent them in the Electoral College via a popular vote. The state of Vermont has 3 electoral votes in the Electoral College, following reapportionment due to the 2020 United States census in which the state neither gained nor lost a seat.

Vermont was won by the Democratic nominee for the ninth time in as many presidential elections. Vice President Kamala Harris carried Vermont by nearly 32 points, a slight decrease from Joe Biden's 35-point victory four years earlier. Nonetheless, it provided Harris with her largest winning margin of any state in 2024.

== Primary elections ==
=== Republican primary ===
The Vermont Republican primary was held on Super Tuesday, March 5, 2024. Nikki Haley won the primary, becoming the first woman to win a state primary in a Republican presidential primary.

Vermont Republican primary, March 5, 2024
Candidate	Votes	Percentage	Actual delegate count		
Candidate	Votes	Percentage	Bound	Unbound	Total
Nikki Haley	36,241	49.32%	9		9
Donald Trump	33,162	45.13%	8		8
Chris Christie (withdrawn)	1,020	1.39%			
Ron DeSantis (withdrawn)	949	1.29%			
Write-in votes	586	0.80%			
Vivek Ramaswamy (withdrawn)	546	0.74%			
Ryan Binkley (withdrawn)	278	0.38%			
Overvotes	51	0.07%			
Blank ballots	654	0.89%			
Total:	73,487	100.00%	17		17

=== Democratic primary ===
The Vermont Democratic primary was held on Super Tuesday, March 5, 2024. Joe Biden won the primary.

2024 Vermont Democratic pres. primary
Candidate	Votes	%	Delegates
Joe Biden (incumbent)	56,924	82.98	16
Marianne Williamson	2,873	4.19	0
Dean Phillips	1,942	2.83	0
Mark Greenstein	779	1.14	0
Rashida Tlaib (write-in)	763	1.11	0
Cenk Uygur	700	1.02	0
Jason Palmer	404	0.59	0
Kamala Harris (write-in)	23	0.03	0
"Blank" (write-in)	556	0.81	—
Robert F. Kennedy Jr. (write-in, Independent)	322	0.47	0
Bernie Sanders (write-in, Independent)	288	0.42	0
Nikki Haley (write-in, Republican)	187	0.27	0
Other write-in votes	1,240	1.81	0
Blank ballots and Overvotes	(Note: 1,525 blank ballots, 73 overvotes)1,598	2.33	—
Total	68,599	100%	16

== General election ==
=== Predictions ===
Source	Ranking	As of
Cook Political Report	Solid D	December 19, 2023
Inside Elections	Solid D	April 26, 2023
Sabato's Crystal Ball	Safe D	June 29, 2023
Decision Desk HQ/The Hill	Safe D	December 14, 2023
CNalysis	Solid D	December 30, 2023
CNN	Solid D	January 14, 2024
The Economist	Safe D	June 12, 2024
538	Solid D	June 11, 2024
NBC News	Safe D	October 6, 2024

=== Polling ===
Kamala Harris vs. Donald Trump

Poll source	Date(s) administered	Sample size (Note: Key: A – all adults RV – registered voters LV – likely voters V – unclear)	Margin of error	Kamala Harris Democratic	Donald Trump Republican	Other / Undecided
	August 23, 2024	Robert F. Kennedy Jr. suspends his presidential campaign and endorses Donald Trump.				
	August 22, 2024	Democratic National Convention concludes				
University of New Hampshire	August 15–19, 2024	924 (LV)	± 3.2%	70%	29%	1%
	August 19, 2024	Democratic National Convention begins				

Kamala Harris vs. Donald Trump vs. Robert F. Kennedy Jr. vs Cornel West vs. Jill Stein vs. Chase Oliver

Poll source	Date(s) administered	Sample size	Margin of error	Kamala Harris Democratic	Donald Trump Republican	Robert Kennedy Jr Independent	Cornel West Independent	Jill Stein Green	Chase Oliver Libertarian	Other / Undecided
University of New Hampshire	October 29 – November 2, 2024	1,167 (LV)	± 2.9%	63%	31%	2%	0%	–	0%	4% (Note: Claudia De la Cruz (PSL) with 2%; "Another Candidate" with 1%)
University of New Hampshire	August 15–19, 2024	924 (LV)	± 3.2%	67%	27%	3%	0%	–	0%	3% (Note: "Another candidate" with 1%)

Hypothetical polling with Joe Biden and Donald Trump

Joe Biden vs. Donald Trump

Poll source	Date(s) administered	Sample size	Margin of error	Joe Biden Democratic	Donald Trump Republican	Other / Undecided
John Zogby Strategies (Note: Poll conducted for Kennedy's campaign)	April 13–21, 2024	272 (LV)	–	56%	35%	9%
Mainstreet Research/Florida Atlantic University	February 29 – March 3, 2024	117 (RV)	–	58%	28%	14% (Note: "Another candidate" with 8%)
Mainstreet Research/Florida Atlantic University	February 29 – March 3, 2024	111 (LV)	–	59%	28%	13% (Note: "Another candidate" with 7%)

Hypothetical polling with other candidates

Joe Biden vs. Robert F. Kennedy Jr.

Poll source	Date(s) administered	Sample size	Margin of error	Joe Biden Democratic	Robert F. Kennedy Jr. Independent	Other / Undecided
John Zogby Strategies	April 13–21, 2024	272 (LV)	–	47%	42%	11%

Robert F. Kennedy Jr. vs. Donald Trump

Poll source	Date(s) administered	Sample size	Margin of error	Robert F. Kennedy Jr. Independent	Donald Trump Republican	Other / Undecided
John Zogby Strategies	April 13–21, 2024	272 (LV)	–	52%	29%	19%

=== Results ===
State House district results: Trump 40–50% 50–60% / Harris 40–50% 50–60% 60–70% 70–80% 80–90%

2024 United States presidential election in Vermont
Party	Candidate	Votes	%	±%
Democratic	Kamala Harris; Tim Walz	235,791	63.83%	–2.26%
Republican	Donald Trump; JD Vance	119,395	32.32%	+1.65%
We the People	Robert F. Kennedy Jr. (withdrawn); Nicole Shanahan (withdrawn)	5,905	1.60%	New
Libertarian	Chase Oliver; Mike ter Maat	1,828	0.49%	–0.49%
Socialism and Liberation	Claudia De la Cruz; Karina Garcia	1,710	0.46%	New
Green Mountain Peace and Justice	Cornel West; Melina Abdullah	1,549	0.42%	+0.37%
Green	Jill Stein (write-in); Butch Ware (write-in)	893	0.24%	−0.12%
Socialist Workers	Rachele Fruit; Dennis Richter	211	0.06%	+0.01%
Write-in		2,140	0.58%	N/A
Total votes		369,422	100.00%	N/A

==== By county ====
County	Kamala Harris Democratic		Donald Trump Republican		Various candidates Other parties		Margin		Total
County	#	%	#	%	#	%	#	%	Total
Addison	14,879	65.82%	6,841	30.26%	887	3.92%	8,038	35.56%	22,607
Bennington	12,326	59.52%	7,697	37.17%	687	3.31%	4,629	22.35%	20,710
Caledonia	8,977	53.97%	6,927	41.65%	729	4.38%	2,050	12.32%	16,633
Chittenden	72,656	74.65%	20,937	21.51%	3,736	3.84%	51,719	53.14%	97,329
Essex	1,344	39.24%	1,890	55.18%	191	5.58%	-546	-15.94%	3,425
Franklin	13,280	49.66%	12,490	46.70%	973	3.64%	790	2.96%	26,743
Grand Isle	2,940	58.79%	1,893	37.85%	168	3.36%	1,047	20.94%	5,001
Lamoille	9,788	65.94%	4,505	30.35%	551	3.71%	5,283	35.59%	14,844
Orange	10,220	57.83%	6,683	37.82%	769	4.35%	3,537	20.01%	17,672
Orleans	7,006	47.45%	7,233	48.99%	526	3.56%	-227	-1.54%	14,765
Rutland	17,375	50.95%	15,586	45.70%	1,141	3.35%	1,789	5.25%	34,102
Washington	24,527	69.35%	9,327	26.37%	1,515	4.28%	15,200	42.98%	35,369
Windham	17,904	69.04%	6,928	26.71%	1,101	4.25%	10,976	42.33%	25,933
Windsor	22,569	65.82%	10,458	30.50%	1,262	3.68%	12,111	35.32%	34,289
Totals	235,791	63.83%	119,395	32.32%	14,236	3.85%	116,396	31.51%	369,422

Counties that flipped from Democratic to Republican

- Orleans (largest municipality: Derby)

==== By congressional district ====
Due to the state's low population, only one congressional district is allocated. This district, called the at-large district because it covers the entire state, is thus equivalent to the statewide election results.

District	Trump	Harris	Representative
At-large	32.32%	63.83%	Becca Balint

== Analysis ==
A sparsely populated state in New England, Vermont is one of the most rural states in the nation and is considered to be deeply blue, contradicting a trend in modern American electoral politics in which rural areas tend to be red. It was historically a moderate to liberal "Yankee Republican" stronghold, having backed the GOP in all but one presidential election between the party's formation and George H. W. Bush's narrow victory in 1988, the exception being Lyndon B. Johnson's 1964 landslide. However, an influx of more liberal voters has turned Vermont into a Democratic stronghold at the presidential level since the early 1990s, as the state has been won by the Democratic candidate in every presidential race starting in 1992, all of these victories being by double digits apart from Al Gore's 9.93% win in 2000. As a measure of how Republican Vermont once was, Trump and George W. Bush are the only Republicans to have won the White House without carrying Vermont.

Despite it being Harris’s strongest state, all of the state’s counties shifted rightward. Bernie Sanders had his weakest Senate election performance in the 2024 U.S. Senate election in Vermont. Moderate Republican governor Phil Scott won in a landslide in the 2024 Vermont gubernatorial election.

Trump managed to narrowly flip Orleans County, the first time for a presidential Republican candidate since 2000, and also the first time a Republican had won any county other than Essex County since then. Vermont was once again the most Democratic state in the nation, only the second occasion in the state's history (behind 2020) in which it was the strongest for the Democrats, and the first time since 1956 in which it was the strongest state for either party in back-to-back elections.

== See also ==
- United States presidential elections in Vermont
- 2024 United States presidential election
- 2024 Democratic Party presidential primaries
- 2024 Republican Party presidential primaries
- 2024 Vermont gubernatorial election
- 2024 Vermont lieutenant gubernatorial election
- 2024 United States elections

== Notes ==
Partisan clients
