= 1924 United States presidential election in Vermont =

- November 4, 1924

Nominee	Calvin Coolidge	John W. Davis	Robert M. La Follette
Party	Republican	Democratic	Progressive
Home state	Massachusetts	West Virginia	Wisconsin
Running mate	Charles G. Dawes	Charles W. Bryan	Burton K. Wheeler
Electoral vote	4	0	0
Popular vote	80,498	16,124	5,964
Percentage	78.22%	15.67%	5.79%

Coolidge
40–50%
50–60%
60–70%
70–80%
80–90%
90–100%
Davis
50–60%
President before election
Calvin Coolidge
Republican
Elected President
Calvin Coolidge
Republican

The 1924 United States presidential election in Vermont took place on November 4, 1924, as part of the 1924 United States presidential election which was held throughout all contemporary 48 states. Voters chose four representatives, or electors to the Electoral College, who voted for president and vice president.

Vermont voted overwhelmingly for the Republican nominee, incumbent President Calvin Coolidge of Massachusetts, over the Democratic nominee, Ambassador John W. Davis of West Virginia. Coolidge ran with former Budget Director Charles G. Dawes of Illinois, while Davis ran with Governor Charles W. Bryan of Nebraska. Also in the running that year was the Progressive Party nominee, Senator Robert M. La Follette of Wisconsin and his running mate Senator Burton K. Wheeler of Montana.

Coolidge won in a massive landslide, taking 78.22% of the vote, while Davis took 15.67% for a Republican victory margin of 62.55%. La Follette came in a distant third, with 5.79%. Coolidge won every town in his birth state except for Lemington in Essex County which narrowly went to John W Davis. Vermont historically was a bastion of Northeastern Republicanism, and by 1924 it had gone Republican in every presidential election since the founding of the Republican Party. From 1856 to 1920, Vermont had had the longest streak of voting Republican of any state, having never voted Democratic before, and this tradition continued amidst a second consecutive nationwide Republican landslide in 1924.

The 1920s were a fiercely Republican decade in American politics, and Vermont in that era was a fiercely Republican state in presidential elections. The economic boom and social good feelings of the Roaring Twenties under popular Republican leadership virtually guaranteed Calvin Coolidge an easy win in the state against the conservative Southern Democrat John Davis, who had practically no appeal in Northern states like Vermont. In fact, with only 15.67% of the popular vote, Davis' performance in Vermont was the weakest of any Democratic presidential candidate in the state to date.

Calvin Coolidge also enjoyed a unique personal popularity which helped him in the state. Coolidge was the epitome of a traditional New England Yankee, having been born in the small-town of Plymouth Notch, Vermont, and establishing his political career nearby as Governor of Massachusetts. Thus Coolidge remained especially popular with voters across New England, but especially in his birth state, and Vermont would give him an even more overwhelming victory than it had given to Warren G. Harding four years earlier. Even with the strong third party candidacy of Robert La Follette, Coolidge in 1924 managed to gain in both vote share and margin over Harding's landslide showing in the state in 1920. Coolidge was particularly popular in Windsor County, his birthplace, which gave him over 88% of the vote and was his strongest county in Vermont and his fifth-strongest nationwide.

Partly as a consequence of Coolidge's personal popularity in the state, Robert La Follette was not able to attract a large percentage of the vote in Vermont. La Follette had been a Republican Senator prior to mounting his Progressive Party presidential campaign, and in working-class Mid-Atlantic and rural German and Scandinavian-American areas was able to peel off a large proportion of progressive Republican voters. However, Vermont Republican voters remained overwhelmingly loyal to Coolidge. Thus while taking 16.61% nationally, La Follette only received 5.79% of the vote in Vermont.

== Results ==
1924 United States presidential election in Vermont
Party	Candidate	Votes	Percentage	Electoral votes
Republican	Calvin Coolidge (incumbent)	80,498	78.22%	4
Democratic	John W. Davis	16,124	15.67%	0
Progressive	Robert M. La Follette	5,964	5.79%	0
Prohibition	Herman P. Faris	326	0.32%	0
N/A	Write-ins	5	0.00%	0
Totals		102,917	100.00%	4

=== Results by county ===
County	John Calvin Coolidge Republican		John William Davis Democratic		Robert M. La Follette, Sr. Progressive		Herman Preston Faris Prohibition		Margin		Total votes cast (Note: These figures show some differences from those published in Edgar Eugene Robinson’s The Presidential Vote and the Géoelections website.)
County	#	%	#	%	#	%	#	%	#	%	Total votes cast
Addison	4,927	87.68%	557	9.91%	105	1.87%	30	0.53%	4,370	77.77%	5,619
Bennington	5,341	72.91%	1,466	20.01%	497	6.78%	21	0.29%	3,875	52.90%	7,325
Caledonia	6,205	83.60%	929	12.52%	268	3.61%	20	0.27%	5,276	71.09%	7,422
Chittenden	8,008	70.96%	2,658	23.55%	580	5.14%	40	0.35%	5,350	47.40%	11,286
Essex	1,391	63.60%	576	26.34%	213	9.74%	7	0.32%	815	37.27%	2,187
Franklin	4,594	67.10%	1,649	24.08%	581	8.49%	23	0.34%	2,945	43.01%	6,847
Grand Isle	861	65.23%	343	25.98%	106	8.03%	10	0.76%	518	39.24%	1,320
Lamoille	2,480	86.23%	305	10.61%	71	2.47%	20	0.70%	2,175	75.63%	2,876
Orange	4,657	82.85%	724	12.88%	233	4.15%	7	0.12%	3,933	69.97%	5,621
Orleans	5,006	85.18%	619	10.53%	218	3.71%	32	0.54%	4,387	74.65%	5,877 (Note: In this county there were two write-in votes for a candidate not on the ballot in any state.)
Rutland	10,642	74.32%	2,477	17.30%	1,143	7.98%	58	0.41%	8,165	57.02%	14,320
Washington	8,525	74.30%	1,715	14.95%	1,207	10.52%	27	0.24%	6,810	59.35%	11,474
Windham	7,638	83.18%	1,091	11.88%	442	4.81%	12	0.13%	6,547	71.29%	9,183
Windsor	10,223	88.43%	1,015	8.78%	300	2.60%	19	0.16%	9,208	79.65%	11,560 (Note: In this county there were three write-in votes for Socialist Labor Party candidate Frank Tetes Johns, who was officially on the ballot in eighteen states in which he compiled a total of 28,633 votes.)
Totals	80,498	78.22%	16,124	15.67%	5,964	5.80%	326	0.32%	64,374	62.55%	102,912

== Analysis ==
Coolidge swept every county in Vermont by landslide margins, taking more than 60% of the vote in all fourteen. Coolidge broke seventy percent of the vote in eleven counties and even broke eighty percent in seven. Notably, Coolidge received more than seventy percent of the vote even in Chittenden County, the state's most populous county, home to the state's largest city, Burlington. Just four years later, in 1928, Chittenden County flipped to the Democrats and become a Democratic stronghold in the New Deal era, making Coolidge's dominance there in 1924 remarkable. It would also be the final time that Chittenden County would be won by a Republican candidate until Dwight D. Eisenhower won it in 1952.

Vermont proved to be the most Republican state in the union in 1924, in terms of both vote share and victory margin. Vermont weighed in as a whopping 37% more Republican than the national average in the 1924 election. No Republican presidential candidate since 1924 has managed to surpass Coolidge's performance in Vermont either in terms of vote share or victory margin. Coolidge's 78.22% of the popular vote percentage is also the fourth strongest for any Republican presidential candidate after William McKinley's 80.08% in 1896 and Ulysses S. Grant's 78.57% and 78.29% in 1868 and 1872. To date, this is the last time that the city of Winooski voted Republican for President.

== See also ==
- United States presidential elections in Vermont
