= 1916 United States presidential election in Vermont =

- November 7, 1916
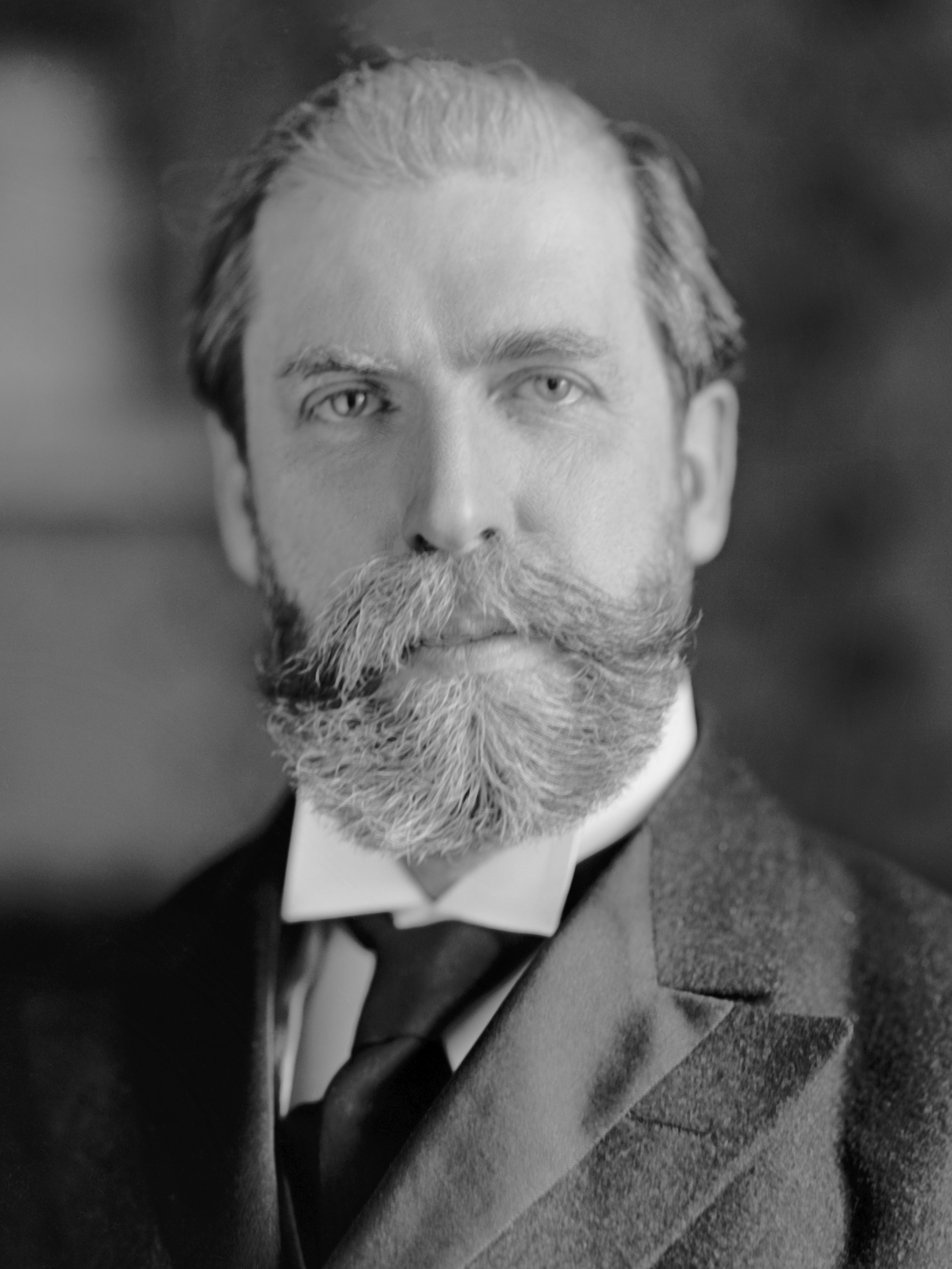

Nominee	Charles Evans Hughes	Woodrow Wilson
Party	Republican	Democratic
Home state	New York	New Jersey
Running mate	Charles W. Fairbanks	Thomas R. Marshall
Electoral vote	4	0
Popular vote	40,250	22,708
Percentage	62.43%	35.22%

Hughes
30–40%
40–50%
50–60%
60–70%
70–80%
80–90%
90–100%
Wilson
40–50%
50–60%
60–70%
70–80%
Tie
40–50%
President before election
Woodrow Wilson
Democratic
Elected President
Woodrow Wilson
Democratic

The 1916 United States presidential election in Vermont took place on November 7, 1916, as part of the 1916 United States presidential election which was held throughout all contemporary 48 states. Voters chose four representatives, or electors to the Electoral College, who voted for president and vice president.

Vermont was won by the Republican nominee, U.S. Supreme Court Justice Charles Evans Hughes of New York, and his running mate Senator Charles W. Fairbanks of Indiana. Hughes and Fairbanks defeated the Democratic nominees, incumbent Democratic President Woodrow Wilson and Vice President Thomas R. Marshall.

Hughes won a decisive victory with 62.43% of the vote, to Wilson's 35.22%, a Republican victory margin of 27.21%.

Vermont historically was a bastion of Northeastern Republicanism, and by 1916 it had gone Republican in every presidential election since the founding of the Republican Party. From 1856 to 1912, Vermont had had the longest streak of voting Republican of any state, having never voted Democratic before, and this tradition continued in 1916.

In 1912, Vermont had been one of only two states (along with Utah) to vote for incumbent Republican President William Howard Taft, who was pushed into third place nationally by the strong third party candidacy of Theodore Roosevelt, a former Republican president who had run in 1912 with his own Progressive Party. Taft and Roosevelt had split the Republican vote nationally in 1912, and in Vermont, Taft edged out Roosevelt 37–35, while Wilson had received only 24% of the vote. With the Republican base re-united behind Charles Evans Hughes in 1916, the GOP scored a landslide win in Vermont with over 62% of the vote, although Wilson also gained 11 points in support from his 1912 showing.

Hughes carried thirteen of the state's fourteen counties, breaking 60% of the vote in 8 of them, and even breaking 70% in 2 counties. Wilson's only county victory came from sparsely populated Grand Isle County in the far northwest of the state, which had also been the only county in the state to give Wilson a plurality win in 1912. This was the first election since 1852 in which a Democratic candidate earned more than forty percent of the vote in any Vermont county.

As Wilson narrowly won re-election nationally, Vermont weighed in as over 30% more Republican than the national average in the 1916 election, making it the most Republican state in the union.

== Results ==
1916 United States presidential election in Vermont
Party	Candidate	Votes	Percentage	Electoral votes
Republican	Charles Evans Hughes	40,250	62.43%	4
Democratic	Woodrow Wilson (incumbent)	22,708	35.22%	0
Socialist	Allan L. Benson	798	1.24%	0
Prohibition	Frank Hanly	709	1.10%	0
N/A	Write-ins	10	0.02%	0
Totals		64,475	100.00%	4

=== Results by county ===
County	Charles Evans Hughes Republican		Woodrow Wilson Democratic		Allan L. Benson Socialist		James F. Hanly Prohibition		Various candidates Write-ins		Margin		Total votes cast
County	#	%	#	%	#	%	#	%	#	%	#	%	Total votes cast
Addison	2,765	74.67%	874	23.60%	11	0.30%	53	1.43%			1,891	51.07%	3,703
Bennington	2,602	60.40%	1,590	36.91%	83	1.93%	33	0.77%			1,012	23.49%	4,308
Caledonia	3,024	60.44%	1,887	37.72%	24	0.48%	68	1.36%			1,137	22.73%	5,003
Chittenden	3,786	56.85%	2,772	41.62%	43	0.65%	58	0.87%	1	0.02%	1,014	15.23%	6,660
Essex	734	56.77%	544	42.07%	7	0.54%	8	0.62%			190	14.69%	1,293
Franklin	2,796	56.41%	2,107	42.51%	11	0.22%	43	0.87%			689	13.90%	4,957
Grand Isle	407	48.17%	434	51.36%	3	0.36%	1	0.12%			-27	-3.20%	845
Lamoille	1,474	67.12%	643	29.28%	27	1.23%	51	2.32%	1	0.05%	831	37.84%	2,196
Orange	2,151	59.31%	1,379	38.02%	51	1.41%	46	1.27%			772	21.28%	3,627
Orleans	2,758	71.58%	1,047	27.17%	7	0.18%	41	1.06%			1,711	44.41%	3,853
Rutland	5,926	66.35%	2,785	31.18%	84	0.94%	134	1.50%	3	0.03%	3,141	35.17%	8,932
Washington	4,216	57.11%	2,732	37.01%	335	4.54%	98	1.33%	1	0.01%	1,484	20.10%	7,382
Windham	3,375	65.50%	1,698	32.95%	42	0.82%	37	0.72%	1	0.02%	1,677	32.54%	5,153
Windsor	4,236	64.54%	2,216	33.77%	70	1.07%	38	0.58%	3	0.05%	2,020	30.78%	6,563
Totals	40,250	62.43%	22,708	35.22%	798	1.24%	709	1.10%	10	0.02%	17,542	27.21%	64,475

==== Counties that flipped from Progressive to Republican ====
- Caledonia
- Franklin
- Lamoille
- Orange
- Orleans
- Windsor

== See also ==
- United States presidential elections in Vermont
