= Grand Isle County, Vermont =

County in Vermont, United States

- County
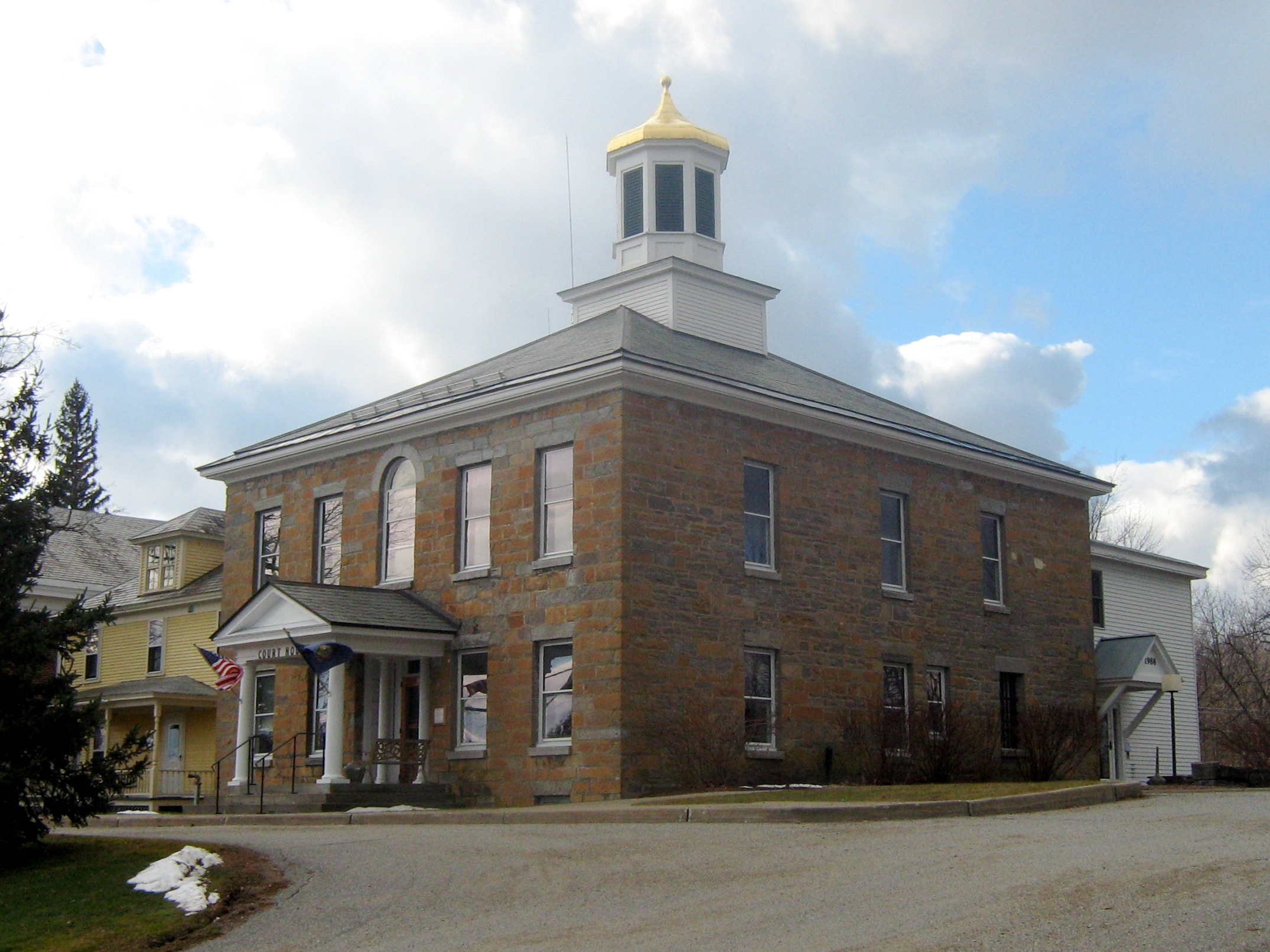
- Grand Isle County Courthouse in North Hero

- Location within the U.S. state of Vermont
- Coordinates: 44°48′58″N 73°18′00″W
- Country: United States
- State: Vermont
- Founded: 1805
- Shire Town: North Hero
- Largest town: Alburgh (town)

Area
  - Total: 195 sq mi (510 km^{2})
  - Land: 82 sq mi (210 km^{2})
  - Water: 113 sq mi (290 km^{2}) 58%

Population (2020)
  - Total: 7,293
  - Estimate (2025): 7,511 ▲
  - Density: 89/sq mi (34/km^{2})
- Time zone: UTC−5 (Eastern)
  - Summer (DST): UTC−4 (EDT)
- Congressional district: At-large

Grand Isle County is a county in the U.S. state of Vermont. As of the 2020 census, the population was 7,293, making it Vermont's second-least populous county. Its shire town (county seat) is North Hero. The county was created in 1802 and organized in 1805.

Grand Isle County is part of the Burlington metropolitan area. The county does not have a high school; students choose from a number of high schools in neighboring counties. The county consists of several non-contiguous and sparsely populated islands and peninsulas of Lake Champlain, connected to each other by U.S. Route 2.

== History ==
Grand Isle County is one of several Vermont counties created from land ceded by the state of New York on January 15, 1777, when Vermont declared itself to be a distinct state from New York. The land was originally contested by Massachusetts, New Hampshire, New France and New Netherland, but it remained undelineated until July 20, 1764, when King George III established the boundary between New Hampshire and New York along the west bank of the Connecticut River, north of Massachusetts and south of the parallel of 45 degrees north latitude. New York assigned the land gained to Albany County. On March 12, 1772, Albany County was partitioned to create Charlotte County, and this situation persisted until Vermont's independence from New York and Britain, which, however, did not end the contest.

On September 3, 1783, as a result of the signing of the Treaty of Paris, the Revolutionary War ended with Great Britain recognizing the independence of the United States. Vermont's border with Quebec was established at 45 degrees north latitude, which explains why this county has no dry-land connection to the rest of the United States.

Massachusetts did not formally withdraw its claim to the region, first made in 1629, until December 16, 1786. New York, still not satisfied with the relinquishment of its land to Vermont, asked the U.S. Congress to arbitrate the matter. Congress ruled against New York on March 7, 1788.

Subsequently, when Vermont petitioned for statehood, Congress ordered a joint commission to settle the border between New York and Vermont. This commission ruled before Vermont's admission, which took place on March 4, 1791, but a small change they permitted has never been acted upon. Grand Isle County was created in 1802 from parts of Franklin and Chittenden Counties.

In the late 19th century the Rutland Railroad ran service from northern New York State by the Canada–U.S. border, along the west side of Vermont to Rutland, Vermont, and south to Chatham, New York. From 1899 a series of causeways provided continuous train service north–south through the Lake Champlain islands, making a direct connection to Burlington. The last service from Alburgh was in 1948.

== Geography ==
According to the U.S. Census Bureau, the county has a total area of 195 square miles (510 km^{2}), of which 82 square miles (210 km^{2}) is land and 113 square miles (290 km^{2}) (58%) is water. It has the highest proportion of water coverage of any county in the state. It is the smallest county in Vermont by area, and the second-smallest by population (only Essex County has fewer people). Four of its five towns (North Hero, South Hero, Grand Isle and Isle La Motte) are situated entirely on islands in Lake Champlain, while Alburgh is on a peninsula (an exclave known as the Alburgh Tongue) extending south into the lake from Quebec. The highest elevation in the county is only 279 feet, on the west side of South Hero. The lake shoreline elevation is generally 99' above sea level.

There are three main inhabited islands, one inhabited peninsula, and many smaller uninhabited islands in Grand Isle County. Alburgh is the physically largest landmass of Grand Isle County, and it lies on a peninsula that borders Quebec to the north. Isle La Motte, North Hero Island, and Grand Island are the three inhabited islands. Grand Isle County does not share any land borders with the Contiguous United States, however there are three roadway bridges that connect Grand Isle County with the mainland United States with two bridges connecting to Vermont and one to New York State at Rouses Point, New York.

=== Adjacent counties ===
- Franklin County – east
- Chittenden County – southeast
- Clinton County, New York – west
- Le Haut-Richelieu Regional County Municipality, Quebec – north

=== Major highways ===
- US 2
- VT 78
- VT 129
- VT 225

== Demographics ==
Historical population
Census	Pop.	Note	%±
1810	3,445		—
1820	3,527		2.4%
1830	3,696		4.8%
1840	3,883		5.1%
1850	4,145		6.7%
1860	4,276		3.2%
1870	4,082		−4.5%
1880	4,124		1.0%
1890	3,843		−6.8%
1900	4,462		16.1%
1910	3,761		−15.7%
1920	3,784		0.6%
1930	3,944		4.2%
1940	3,802		−3.6%
1950	3,406		−10.4%
1960	2,927		−14.1%
1970	3,574		22.1%
1980	4,613		29.1%
1990	5,318		15.3%
2000	6,901		29.8%
2010	6,970		1.0%
2020	7,293		4.6%
2025 (est.)	7,511	▲	3.0%
U.S. Decennial Census; 1790–1960 1900–1990; 1990–2000 2010–2018

=== 2020 census ===
As of the 2020 census, the county had a population of 7,293. Of the residents, 17.4% were under the age of 18 and 23.6% were 65 years of age or older; the median age was 50.4 years. For every 100 females there were 102.2 males, and for every 100 females age 18 and over there were 101.2 males.

The racial makeup of the county was 92.2% White, 0.7% Black or African American, 0.6% American Indian and Alaska Native, 0.5% Asian, 0.6% from some other race, and 5.5% from two or more races. Hispanic or Latino residents of any race comprised 1.7% of the population.

There were 3,170 households in the county, of which 24.4% had children under the age of 18 living with them and 19.5% had a female householder with no spouse or partner present. About 24.9% of all households were made up of individuals and 12.1% had someone living alone who was 65 years of age or older.

There were 5,265 housing units, of which 39.8% were vacant. Among occupied housing units, 83.3% were owner-occupied and 16.7% were renter-occupied. The homeowner vacancy rate was 1.9% and the rental vacancy rate was 8.8%.

Grand Isle County, Vermont – Racial and ethnic composition Note: the US Census treats Hispanic/Latino as an ethnic category. This table excludes Latinos from the racial categories and assigns them to a separate category. Hispanics/Latinos may be of any race.
Race / Ethnicity (NH = Non-Hispanic)	Pop 2000	Pop 2010	Pop 2020	% 2000	% 2010	% 2020
White alone (NH)	6,698	6,600	6,697	97.05%	94.69%	91.82%
Black or African American alone (NH)	9	23	49	0.13%	0.32%	0.67%
Native American or Alaska Native alone (NH)	60	64	39	0.86%	0.91%	0.53%
Asian alone (NH)	15	21	30	0.21%	0.30%	0.41%
Pacific Islander alone (NH)	3	4	0	0.04%	0.05%	0.00%
Other race alone (NH)	0	3	16	0.00%	0.04%	0.21%
Mixed race or Multiracial (NH)	87	175	335	1.26%	2.53%	4.59%
Hispanic or Latino (any race)	29	80	127	0.42%	1.14%	1.74%
Total	6,901	6,970	7,293	100.00%	100.00%	100.00%

=== 2010 census ===
As of the 2010 United States census, there were 6,970 people, 2,902 households, and 2,027 families living in the county. The population density was 85.2 inhabitants per square mile (32.9/km^{2}). There were 5,048 housing units at an average density of 61.7 units per square mile (23.8 units/km^{2}). The racial makeup of the county was 95.3% white, 0.9% American Indian, 0.4% black or African American, 0.3% Asian, 0.1% Pacific islander, 0.3% from other races, and 2.8% from two or more races. Those of Hispanic or Latino origin made up 1.1% of the population. In terms of ancestry, 18.0% were English, 14.2% were Irish, 10.6% were French Canadian, 10.3% were German, 10.3% were American, and 6.9% were Scottish.

Of the 2,902 households, 28.4% had children under the age of 18 living with them, 56.2% were married couples living together, 8.6% had a female householder with no husband present, 30.2% were non-families, and 22.5% of all households were made up of individuals. The average household size was 2.40 and the average family size was 2.79. The median age was 45.5 years.

The median income for a household in the county was $57,436 and the median income for a family was $66,686. Males had a median income of $46,569 versus $36,514 for females. The per capita income for the county was $30,499. About 6.1% of families and 6.4% of the population were below the poverty line, including 9.9% of those under age 18 and 3.7% of those age 65 or over.

=== 2000 census ===
As of the census of 2000, there were 6,901 people, 2,761 households, and 1,954 families living in the county. The population density was 84 people per square mile (32 people/km^{2}). There were 4,663 housing units at an average density of 56 units per square mile (22 units/km^{2}). The racial makeup of the county was 97.41% White, 0.14% Black or African American, 0.87% Native American, 0.23% Asian, 0.04% Pacific Islander, 0.03% from other races, and 1.28% from two or more races. 0.42% of the population were Hispanic or Latino of any race. 18.8% were of French, 14.6% French Canadian, 14.3% English, 10.6% American, 8.9% Irish and 7.4% German ancestry. 95.0% spoke English and 3.8% French as their first language.

There were 2,761 households, out of which 31.20% had children under the age of 18 living with them, 60.10% were married couples living together, 7.10% had a female householder with no husband present, and 29.20% were non-families. 22.20% of all households were made up of individuals, and 8.20% had someone living alone who was 65 years of age or older. The average household size was 2.50 and the average family size was 2.93.

In the county, the population was spread out, with 24.80% under the age of 18, 5.60% from 18 to 24, 28.70% from 25 to 44, 28.50% from 45 to 64, and 12.30% who were 65 years of age or older. The median age was 40 years. For every 100 females, there were 99.90 males. For every 100 females age 18 and over, there were 97.90 males.

The median income for a household in the county was $43,033, and the median income for a family was $48,878. Males had a median income of $35,539 versus $26,278 for females. The per capita income for the county was $22,207. About 5.90% of families and 7.60% of the population were below the poverty line, including 9.20% of those under age 18 and 7.90% of those age 65 or over.

== Politics ==
In 1828, Grand Isle County was won by National Republican Party candidate John Quincy Adams and in 1832 was won by Henry Clay.

From William Henry Harrison in 1836 to Winfield Scott in 1852, the county voted for Whig Party candidates.

From John C. Frémont in 1856 to William Howard Taft in 1908, the Republican Party had a 52-year winning streak in the county.

In 1912, Democratic Party candidate Woodrow Wilson won the county, making him the first Democratic presidential candidate to win the county and the first since Lewis Cass in 1848 to win any Vermont county. Wilson also won the county in 1916.

Republican candidates Warren Harding, Calvin Coolidge and Herbert Hoover won the county in 1920, 1924 and 1928, respectively.

Democratic candidate Franklin D. Roosevelt won Grand Isle County in all four of his presidential runs, from 1932 to 1944. During that time, Grand Isle, Chittenden and Franklin Counties became Democratic enclaves in an otherwise Republican-voting Vermont. The county was also won by Harry S. Truman in 1948.

Dwight D. Eisenhower won back Grand Isle County for the Republicans in the 1952 and 1956 elections.

The county went to Democratic candidates John F. Kennedy in 1960 and Lyndon B. Johnson in 1964.

Richard Nixon carried the county in 1968 and in 1972, as did Gerald Ford in 1976.

In 1980, the county was narrowly won by Democrat Jimmy Carter; in 1984, the county was won by Ronald Reagan, the last Republican presidential candidate to win Grand Isle County.

Since Michael Dukakis in 1988, the county has been won by Democratic candidates.

In the 2004, Grand Isle County chose John Kerry over George W. Bush by 12 points, with Kerry carrying all six municipalities.

In 2008, Barack Obama carried the county by a 28.2% margin over John McCain, with Obama winning by 37% statewide.

United States presidential election results for Grand Isle County, Vermont
Year	Republican		Democratic		Third party(ies)	
Year	No.	%	No.	%	No.	%
1880	397	60.80%	239	36.60%	17	2.60%
1884	407	62.81%	207	31.94%	34	5.25%
1888	465	71.76%	180	27.78%	3	0.46%
1892	349	64.75%	177	32.84%	13	2.41%
1896	426	69.04%	158	25.61%	33	5.35%
1900	356	68.86%	146	28.24%	15	2.90%
1904	343	73.61%	109	23.39%	14	3.00%
1908	364	64.31%	188	33.22%	14	2.47%
1912	193	31.03%	210	33.76%	219	35.21%
1916	407	48.17%	434	51.36%	4	0.47%
1920	928	71.60%	354	27.31%	14	1.08%
1924	861	65.23%	343	25.98%	116	8.79%
1928	830	50.55%	801	48.78%	11	0.67%
1932	649	43.94%	811	54.91%	17	1.15%
1936	712	45.41%	852	54.34%	4	0.26%
1940	716	41.65%	998	58.06%	5	0.29%
1944	667	45.44%	801	54.56%	0	0.00%
1948	724	46.32%	822	52.59%	17	1.09%
1952	976	59.15%	665	40.30%	9	0.55%
1956	978	61.82%	604	38.18%	0	0.00%
1960	798	49.35%	819	50.65%	0	0.00%
1964	506	33.67%	996	66.27%	1	0.07%
1968	754	48.36%	730	46.82%	75	4.81%
1972	1,259	62.39%	743	36.82%	16	0.79%
1976	1,004	52.59%	866	45.36%	39	2.04%
1980	947	42.28%	999	44.60%	294	13.13%
1984	1,537	60.27%	980	38.43%	33	1.29%
1988	1,316	48.24%	1,369	50.18%	43	1.58%
1992	1,012	29.95%	1,444	42.73%	923	27.32%
1996	958	31.50%	1,555	51.13%	528	17.36%
2000	1,550	42.61%	1,835	50.44%	253	6.95%
2004	1,754	43.02%	2,246	55.09%	77	1.89%
2008	1,490	34.90%	2,694	63.11%	85	1.99%
2012	1,471	36.10%	2,531	62.11%	73	1.79%
2016	1,487	36.19%	2,094	50.96%	528	12.85%
2020	1,810	37.31%	2,905	59.88%	136	2.80%
2024	1,893	37.85%	2,940	58.79%	168	3.36%

Gubernatorial elections results

Gubernatorial elections results
Year	Republican	Democratic	Third parties
2024	81.75% 4,050	15.02% 744	3.23% 160
2022	78.78% 3,115	16.54% 654	4.68% 185
2020	77.84% 3,755	19.15% 924	3.01% 145
2018	65.49% 2,429	30.68% 1,138	3.83% 142
2016	63.16% 2,615	34.35% 1,422	2.49% 103
2014	50.46% 1,490	40.50% 1,196	9.03% 267
2012	44.79% 1,811	51.67% 2,089	3.54% 143
2010	54.57% 1,906	42.80% 1,495	2.63% 92
2008	59.65% 2,523	21.37% 904	18.98% 803
2006	64.09% 2,350	33.52% 1,229	2.39% 88
2004	63.07% 2,558	33.60% 1,363	3.33% 135
2002	49.81% 1,577	37.27% 1,180	12.92% 409
2000	43.75% 1,596	45.48% 1,659	10.75% 393

== Communities ==
=== Towns ===
- Alburgh
- Grand Isle
- Isle La Motte
- North Hero (shire town)
- South Hero

=== Village ===
- Alburgh

=== Census-designated place ===
- South Hero

== Education ==
There is one school district in the county, the Grand Isle Supervisory Union, which has elementary school services.

== Notable person ==
- Bernie Sanders, former mayor of Burlington (1981–1989), U.S. Senator from Vermont since 2007, and 2016 and 2020 Democratic presidential candidate

== See also ==
- List of counties in Vermont
- List of municipalities in Vermont
- National Register of Historic Places listings in Grand Isle County, Vermont
