= 1840 United States presidential election in Vermont =

- November 10, 1840
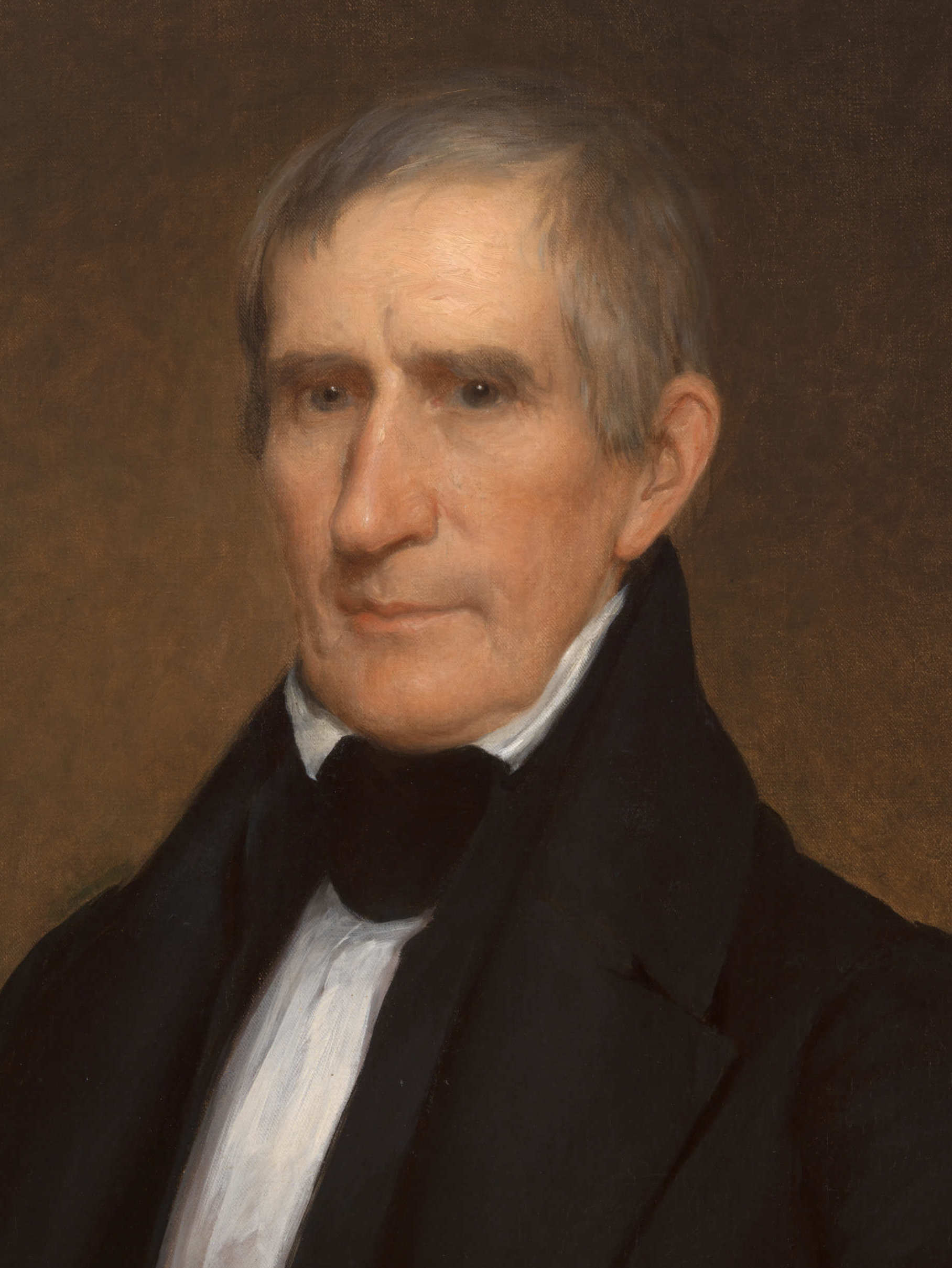

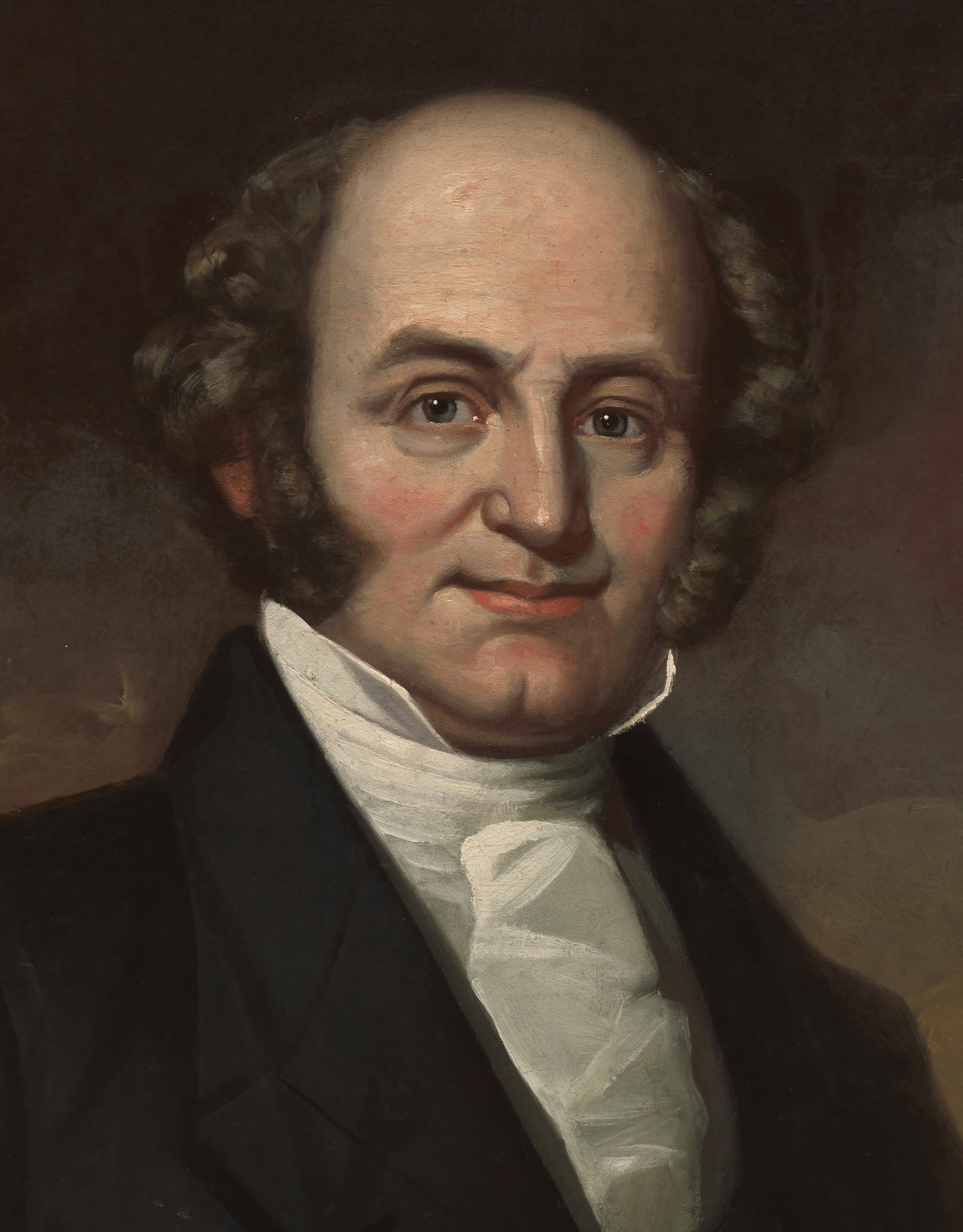
Nominee	William Henry Harrison	Martin Van Buren
Party	Whig	Democratic
Home state	Ohio	New York
Running mate	John Tyler	none
Electoral vote	7	0
Popular vote	32,445	18,009
Percentage	63.90%	35.47%
County results
Harrison
50–60%
60–70%
70–80%
President before election
Martin Van Buren
Democratic
Elected President
William Henry Harrison
Whig

A presidential election was held in Vermont on November 10, 1840 as part of the 1840 United States presidential election. Voters chose seven representatives, or electors to the Electoral College, who voted for President and Vice President.

Vermont voted for the Whig candidate, William Henry Harrison, over Democratic candidate Martin Van Buren. Harrison won Vermont by a margin of 28.43%.

Harrison's 28.43% margin of victory made it his strongest victory in the election while he carried 63.90% of the popular vote made Vermont his second strongest state after Kentucky.

Harrison had previously won Vermont against Van Buren four years earlier.

== Results ==
1840 United States presidential election in Vermont
Party	Candidate	Running mate	Popular vote		Electoral vote	
Party	Candidate	Running mate	Count	%	Count	%
Whig	William Henry Harrison of Ohio	John Tyler of Virginia	32,445	63.90%	7	100.00%
Democratic	Martin Van Buren of New York	Richard Mentor Johnson of Kentucky	18,009	35.47%	0	0.00%
Liberty	James G. Birney of New York	Thomas Earle of Pennsylvania	319	0.63%	0	0.00%
Total			50,773	100.00%	7	100.00%

== See also ==
- United States presidential elections in Vermont
