= 1940 United States presidential election in Vermont =

- November 5, 1940

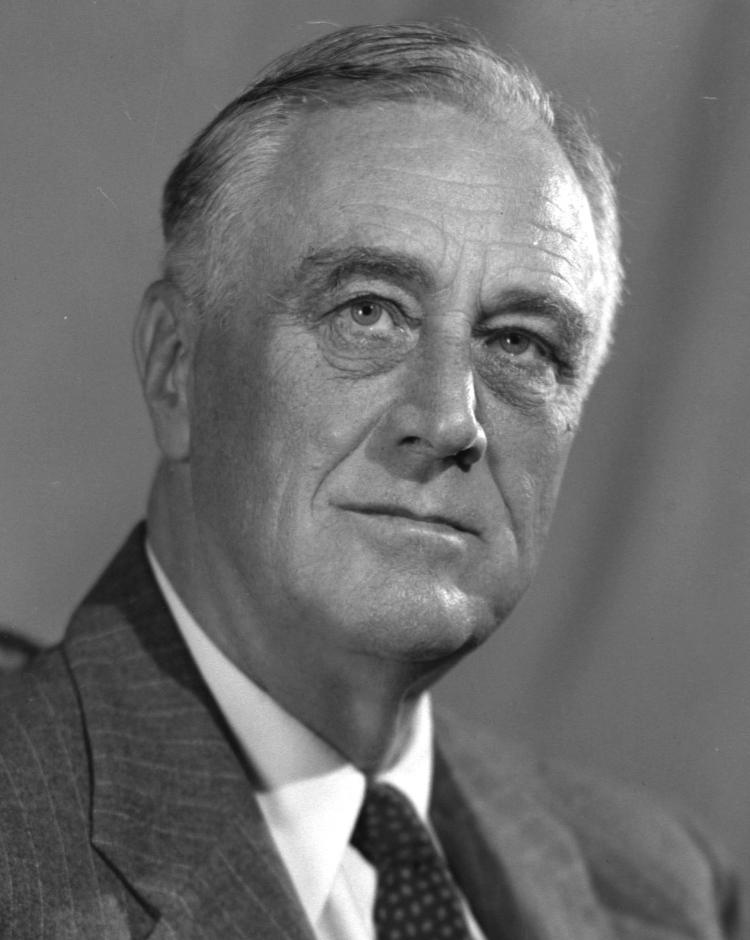
Nominee	Wendell Willkie	Franklin D. Roosevelt
Party	Republican	Democratic
Home state	New York	New York
Running mate	Charles L. McNary	Henry A. Wallace
Electoral vote	3	0
Popular vote	78,371	64,269
Percentage	54.78%	44.92%

Willkie
40–50%
50–60%
60–70%
70–80%
80–90%
90–100%
Roosevelt
50–60%
60–70%
70–80%
90–100%
Tie
40–50%
50%
President before election
Franklin D. Roosevelt
Democratic
Elected President
Franklin D. Roosevelt
Democratic

The 1940 United States presidential election in Vermont took place on November 5, 1940, as part of the 1940 United States presidential election which was held throughout all contemporary 48 states. Voters chose three representatives, or electors to the Electoral College, who voted for president and vice president.

Vermont voted for the Republican nominee, corporate lawyer Wendell Willkie of New York, over the Democratic nominee, incumbent President Franklin D. Roosevelt of New York. Willkie's running mate was Senate Minority Leader Charles L. McNary of Oregon, while Roosevelt ran with Secretary of Agriculture Henry A. Wallace of Iowa.

Willkie took 54.78% of the vote, to Roosevelt's 44.92%, a margin of 9.86%. Vermont historically was a bastion of Northeastern Republicanism, and by 1940, it had gone Republican in every presidential election since the founding of the Republican Party. From 1856 to 1936, Vermont had had the longest streak of voting Republican of any state, having never voted Democratic before, and this tradition continued in 1940. Vermont had been one of only two states, along with nearby Maine, to reject Roosevelt in all four of his successful presidential campaigns, even in the nationwide Democratic landslides of 1932 and 1936.

However, 1940 would prove to be Roosevelt's high point in Vermont, and in New England as a whole, even as the rest of the nation shifted toward the GOP. Roosevelt came within just under 10 percentage points of winning the state, the only time he ever got within single digits of a Republican opponent there. The results in Maine, the only state to have joined Vermont in voting Republican in 1936, showed a similar but even more dramatic swing toward Roosevelt, with Willkie holding onto Maine by a narrow 51–49 margin. Roosevelt's gain in Vermont and other New England states, in an election when Willkie carried almost 700 counties that the President had won during his landslide four years beforehand, was due to support in the region for helping Britain and France during World War II. As a result, Vermont became one of five states that shifted left from 1936, alongside Maine, New Hampshire, North Carolina, and Rhode Island.

Whereas Vermont had been the most Republican state in the union in the 1930s, a strong swing against Roosevelt in the Midwest pushed Vermont into being only the fifth-most Republican state after South Dakota, Nebraska, Kansas, and North Dakota, although it still registered as a strong twenty percent more Republican than the national average. Willkie carried ten of the state's 14 counties, breaking 60% in six of them. However, Roosevelt carried Vermont's three northwestern counties of Chittenden County, Franklin County, and Grand Isle County, all of which were Democratic enclaves in an otherwise Republican state throughout the 1930s and 1940s. Roosevelt also managed to carry for the first time rural Essex County in the northeastern portion of the state, being the first Democrat to do so since Martin Van Buren in 1836.

== Results ==
1940 United States presidential election in Vermont
Party	Candidate	Votes	Percentage	Electoral votes
Republican	Wendell Willkie	78,371	54.78%	3
Democratic	Franklin D. Roosevelt (incumbent)	64,269	44.92%	0
Communist	Earl Browder	411	0.29%	0
N/A	Write-ins	11	0.01%	0
Totals		143,062	100.00%	3

=== Results by county ===
County	Wendell Lewis Willkie Republican		Franklin Delano Roosevelt Democratic		Various candidates Other parties		Margin		Total votes cast
County	#	%	#	%	#	%	#	%	Total votes cast
Addison	4,500	63.22%	2,593	36.43%	25	0.35%	1,907	26.79%	7,118
Bennington	5,845	57.42%	4,308	42.32%	27	0.27%	1,537	15.10%	10,180
Caledonia	5,793	62.56%	3,444	37.19%	23	0.25%	2,349	25.37%	9,260
Chittenden	7,926	41.58%	11,069	58.07%	66	0.35%	-3,143	-16.49%	19,061
Essex	1,365	46.96%	1,531	52.67%	11	0.38%	-166	-5.71%	2,907
Franklin	5,258	41.21%	7,439	58.30%	63	0.49%	-2,181	-17.09%	12,760
Grand Isle	716	41.65%	998	58.06%	5	0.29%	-282	-16.40%	1,719
Lamoille	2,566	63.61%	1,463	36.27%	5	0.12%	1,103	27.34%	4,034
Orange	4,527	68.81%	2,029	30.84%	23	0.35%	2,498	37.97%	6,579
Orleans	4,480	57.52%	3,294	42.29%	15	0.19%	1,186	15.23%	7,789
Rutland	10,829	55.02%	8,798	44.70%	54	0.27%	2,031	10.32%	19,681
Washington	8,426	52.00%	7,727	47.69%	50	0.31%	699	4.31%	16,203
Windham	7,031	63.01%	4,101	36.75%	27	0.24%	2,930	26.26%	11,159
Windsor	9,109	62.34%	5,475	37.47%	28	0.19%	3,634	24.87%	14,612
Totals	78,371	54.78%	64,269	44.92%	422	0.29%	14,102	9.86%	143,062

==== Counties that flipped from Republican to Democratic ====
- Essex

== See also ==
- United States presidential elections in Vermont
