= 1836 United States presidential election in Vermont =

- November 15, 1836
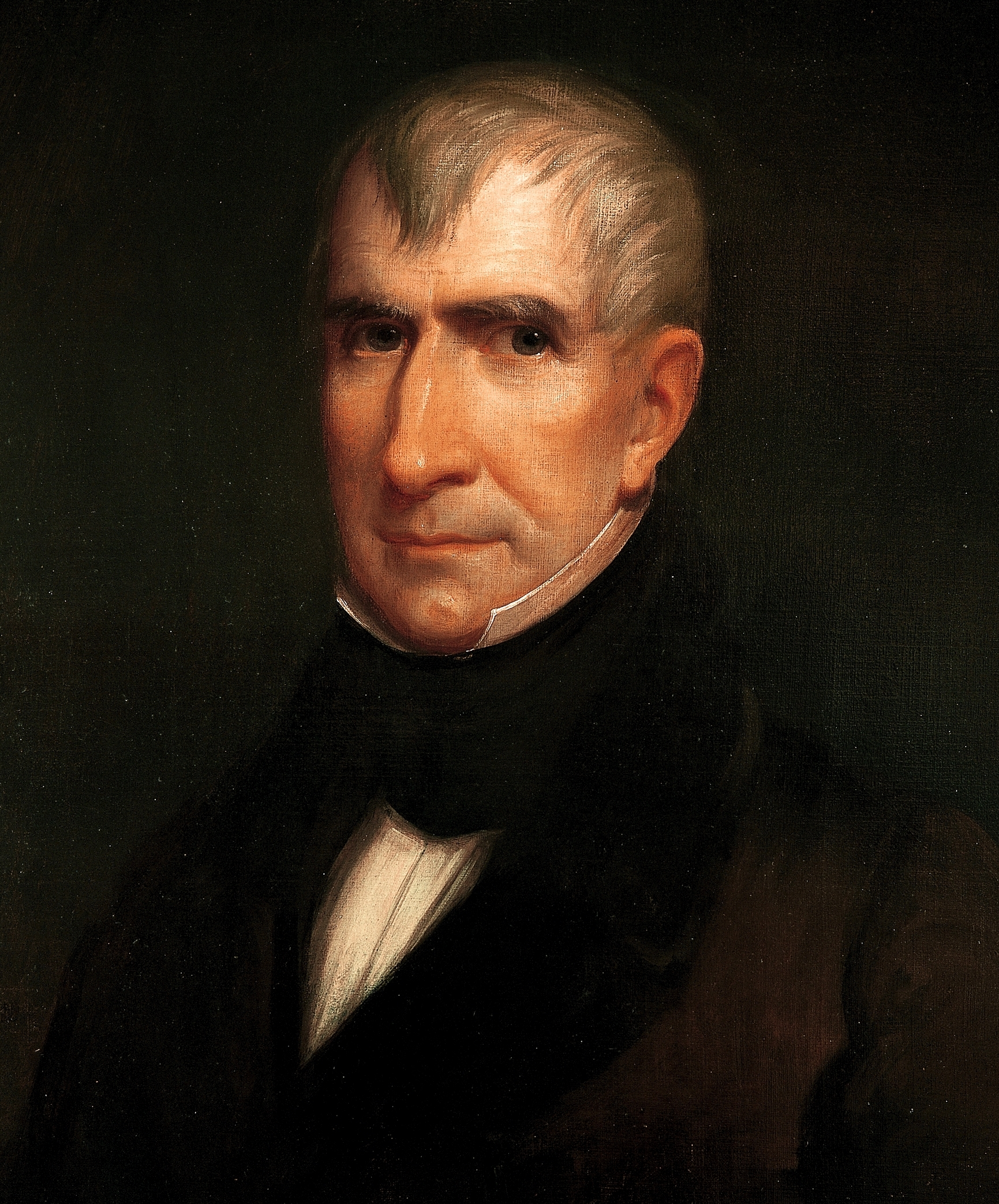

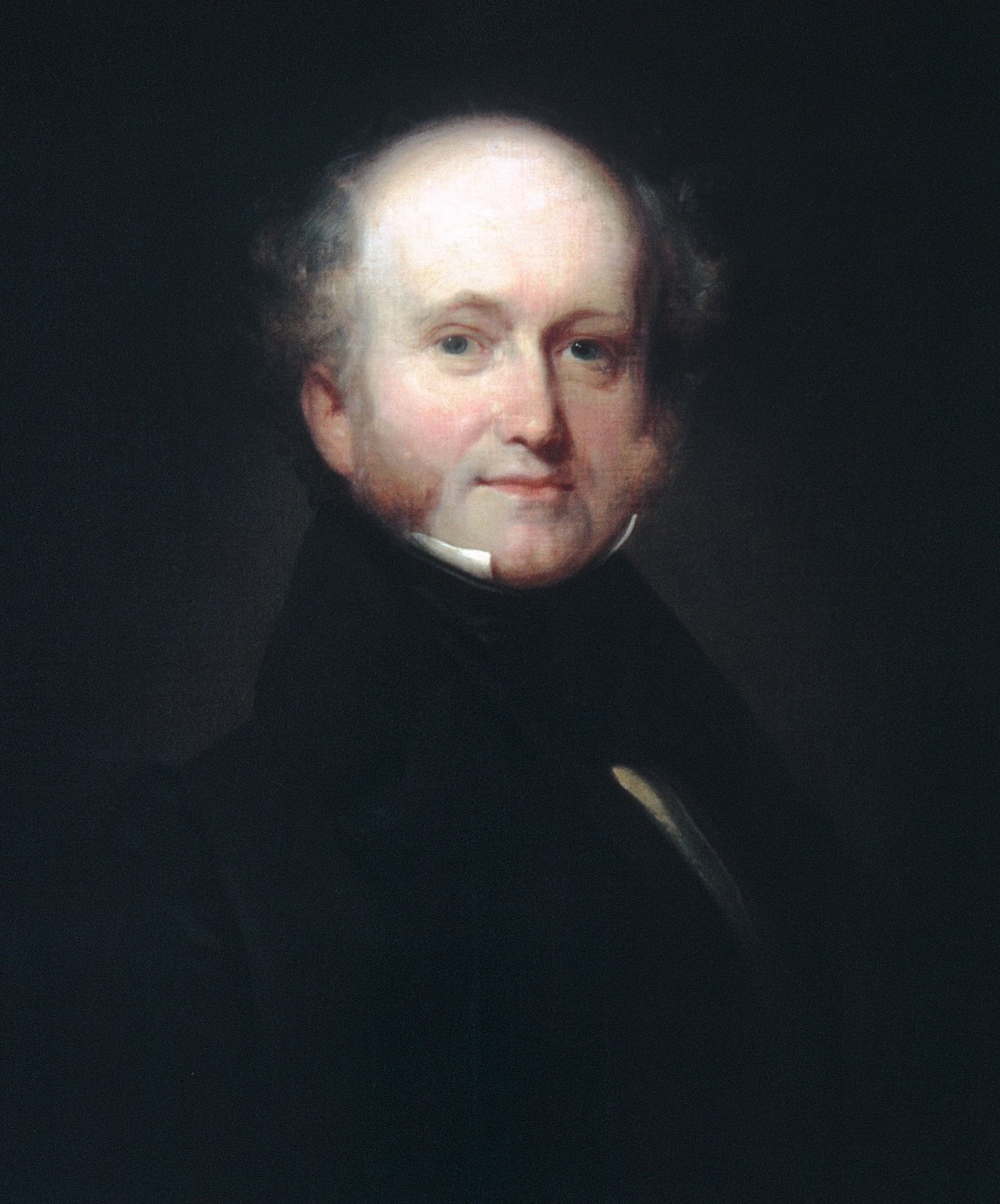
Nominee	William Henry Harrison	Martin Van Buren
Party	Whig	Democratic
Home state	Ohio	New York
Running mate	Francis Granger	Richard Mentor Johnson
Electoral vote	7	0
Popular vote	20,994	14,037
Percentage	59.93%	40.07%
County results
Harrison
50–60%
60–70%
70–80%
Van Buren
50–60%
Unknown/No vote
President before election
Andrew Jackson
Democratic
Elected President
Martin Van Buren
Democratic

A presidential election was held in Vermont on November 15, 1836 as part of the 1836 United States presidential election. Voters chose seven representatives, or electors to the Electoral College, who voted for President and Vice President.

Vermont voted for Whig candidate William Henry Harrison over Democratic candidate Martin Van Buren. Harrison won Vermont by a margin of 19.86%.

This would be the final time a Democratic candidate would carry Essex County until Franklin D. Roosevelt won it 104 years later in 1940.

1836 would stand as the strongest performance for a Democratic candidate in Vermont until 96 years later in 1932, when Franklin D. Roosevelt performed slightly better with 41.08%.

Harrison would later win Vermont again four years later when he defeated Van Buren.

== Results ==
1836 United States presidential election in Vermont
Party	Candidate	Running mate	Popular vote		Electoral vote	
Party	Candidate	Running mate	Count	%	Count	%
Whig	William Henry Harrison of Ohio	Francis Granger of New York	20,994	59.93%	7	100.00%
Democratic	Martin Van Buren of New York	Richard Mentor Johnson of Kentucky	14,037	40.07%	0	0.00%
Total			35,031	100.00%	7	100.00%

== See also ==
- United States presidential elections in Vermont
