= 1912 United States presidential election in Vermont =

- November 5, 1912
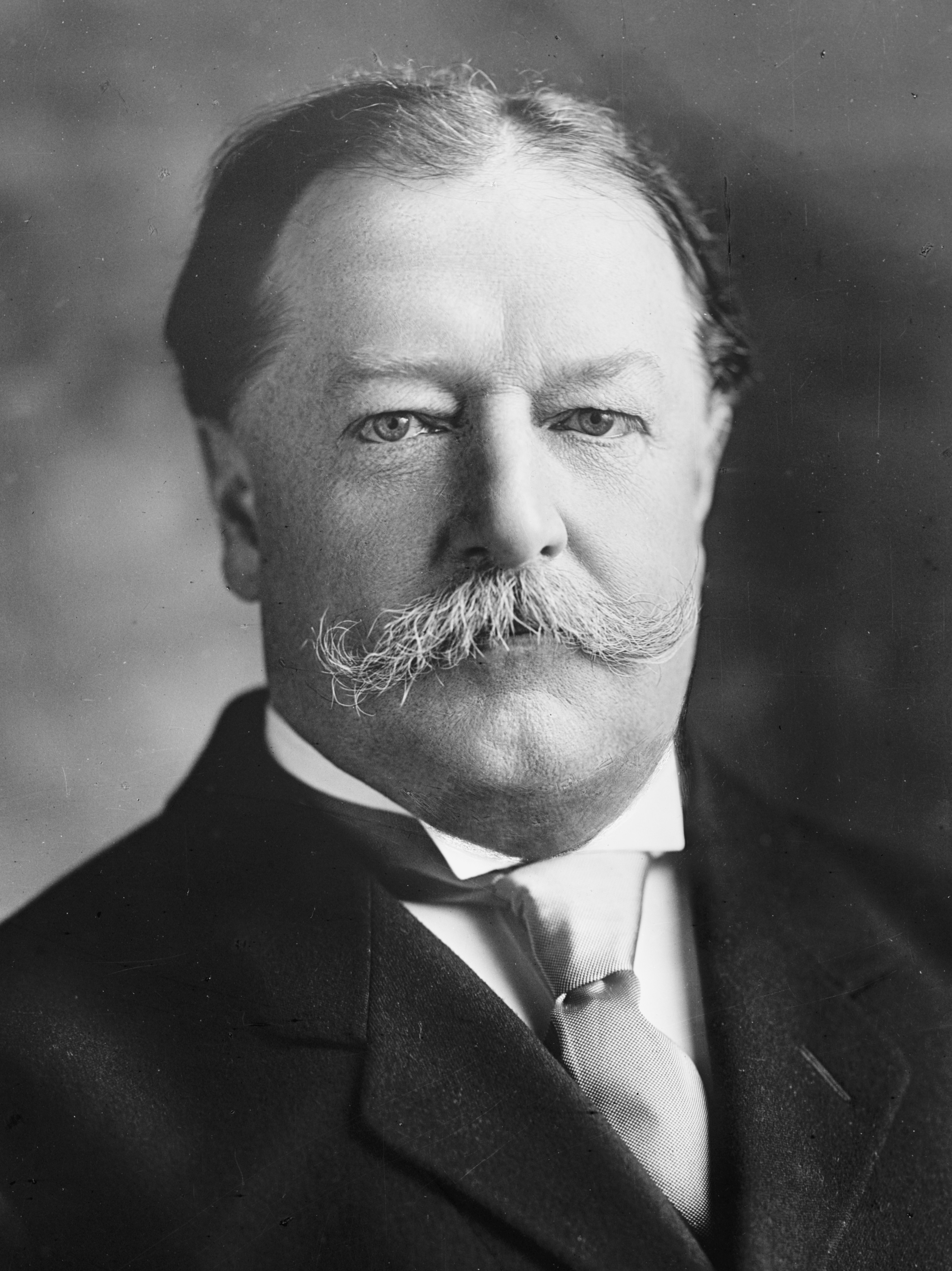

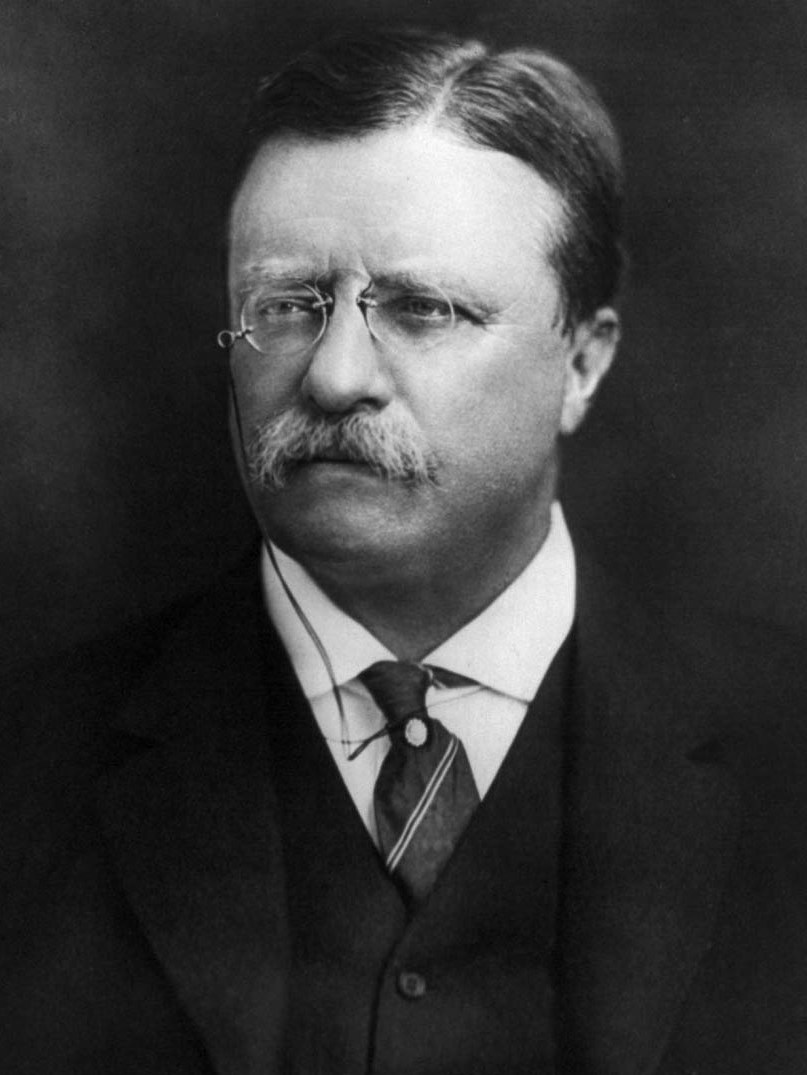

Nominee	William Howard Taft	Theodore Roosevelt	Woodrow Wilson
Party	Republican	Progressive	Democratic
Home state	Ohio	New York	New Jersey
Running mate	Nicholas Murray Butler	Hiram Johnson	Thomas R. Marshall
Electoral vote	4	0	0
Popular vote	23,332	22,132	15,354
Percentage	37.13%	35.22%	24.43%

Taft
30–40%
40–50%
50–60%
60–70%
70–80%
80–90%
Roosevelt
30–40%
40–50%
50–60%
60–70%
Wilson
30–40%
40–50%
50–60%
60–70%
Tie
President before election
William Howard Taft
Republican
Elected President
Woodrow Wilson
Democratic

The 1912 United States presidential election in Vermont took place on November 5, 1912, as part of the 1912 United States presidential election which was held throughout all contemporary 48 states. Voters chose four representatives, or electors to the Electoral College, who voted for president and vice president.

Vermont was won by the Republican nominees, incumbent President William Howard Taft from Ohio, and his running mate Nicholas Murray Butler from New Jersey. Taft and Butler defeated the Progressive Party candidates, former President Theodore Roosevelt from New York and his running mate California Governor Hiram Johnson, and the Democratic nominees, New Jersey Governor Woodrow Wilson and Indiana Governor Thomas R. Marshall.

Taft won the state with a plurality of 37.13%, to Roosevelt's 35.22%, with Wilson in third place at 24.43%. Taft's victory margin over Roosevelt was 1.91%. Historically, Vermont was a bastion of Northeastern Republicanism, and by 1912 it had gone Republican in every presidential election since the founding of the Republican Party. From 1856 to 1908, Vermont had the longest streak of voting Republican of any state, having never voted Democratic before, and this tradition continued in 1912.

Vermont was one of only two states (along with Utah) to vote for incumbent Republican President William Howard Taft, who was pushed into third place nationally by the strong third-party candidacy of Theodore Roosevelt, a former Republican president who formed his own Bull Moose Party after a failed challenge to Taft for the Republican nod. Taft and Roosevelt split the Republican vote nationally in 1912, with Roosevelt coming in second place behind Wilson nationwide and carrying six states. However, Vermont Republicans proved to be mostly loyal to President Taft as the official Republican nominee, allowing Taft to edge out Roosevelt narrowly to carry the state, leaving Wilson a distant third. Were Taft and Roosevelt voters united behind a single Republican candidate, they would have combined to over 72% of the vote in Vermont.

Socialist candidate Eugene V. Debs, who got 6% of the election vote nationally in 1912, performed much poorer in Vermont with just 1.48% of the vote and finishing in fifth place in Vermont, which was even lower than the 1.74% of the vote won by Prohibition candidate Eugene W. Chafin who finished in fourth in Vermont. However, in the city of Barre, Debs got 24% of the vote, and also got over 12% of the vote within the surrounding town of Barre. Both Barre City and Barre Town are within Washington County, which was Debs' best county in the state by some distance with 5.50%, but which was still below his 6% vote in the election across the nation as a whole. Barre City is the home of the Socialist Labor Party Hall, which was a location for debates among socialists, anarchists and trade union leaders over the future direction of the labor movement in the United States in the early 20th century.

Vermont was the third most Republican state in the nation in 1912, only beaten by Utah and neighboring New Hampshire. However, Taft's margin over Wilson was much greater in Vermont than in Utah or any other state.

== Results ==
1912 United States presidential election in Vermont
Party	Candidate	Votes	Percentage	Electoral votes
Republican	William Howard Taft (incumbent)	23,332	37.13%	4
Progressive	Theodore Roosevelt	22,132	35.22%	0
Democratic	Woodrow Wilson	15,354	24.43%	0
Prohibition	Eugene W. Chafin	1,095	1.74%	0
Socialist	Eugene V. Debs	928	1.48%	0
Totals		62,841	100.00%	4

=== Results by county ===
	William Howard Taft Republican		Woodrow Wilson Democratic		Theodore Roosevelt Progressive "Bull Moose"		Eugene Chafin Prohibition		Eugene Debs Socialist		Margin (Note: Because Roosevelt finished ahead of Wilson in Vermont as a whole, all margins give are Taft minus Roosevelt unless stated in the total for the county in question.)		Total votes cast
County	#	%	#	%	#	%	#	%	#	%	#	%	#
Addison	1,835	45.34%	621	15.34%	1,487	36.74%	85	2.10%	19	0.47%	348	8.60%	4,047
Bennington	1,464	36.10%	1,057	26.07%	1,380	34.03%	49	1.21%	105	2.59%	84	2.07%	4,055
Caledonia	1,583	32.86%	1,065	22.11%	2,049	42.54%	88	1.83%	32	0.66%	-466	-9.67%	4,817
Chittenden	2,368	36.80%	2,266	35.21%	1,663	25.84%	96	1.49%	42	0.65%	102 (Note: In this county where Wilson did finish ahead of Roosevelt, margin given is Taft vote minus Wilson vote and percentage margin Taft percentage minus Wilson percentage)	1.59%	6,435
Essex	463	39.01%	348	29.32%	353	29.74%	13	1.10%	10	0.84%	110	9.27%	1,187
Franklin	1,433	33.16%	1,317	30.48%	1,457	33.72%	89	2.06%	25	0.58%	-24	-0.56%	4,321
Grand Isle	193	31.03%	210	33.76%	204	32.80%	9	1.45%	6	0.96%	6 (Note: In this county where Taft ran third behind both Wilson and Roosevelt, margin given is Wilson vote minus Roosevelt vote and percentage margin Wilson percentage minus Roosevelt percentage)	0.96%	622
Lamoille	852	36.04%	431	18.23%	996	42.13%	55	2.33%	30	1.27%	-144	-6.09%	2,364
Orange	1,289	34.19%	956	25.36%	1,426	37.82%	67	1.78%	32	0.85%	-137	-3.63%	3,770
Orleans	1,475	36.37%	628	15.49%	1,891	46.63%	44	1.09%	17	0.42%	-416	-10.26%	4,055
Rutland	2,999	36.03%	2,079	24.98%	2,927	35.16%	240	2.88%	79	0.95%	72	0.86%	8,324
Washington	2,797	41.26%	1,743	25.71%	1,730	25.52%	136	2.01%	373	5.50%	1,054	15.55%	6,779
Windham	2,143	38.25%	1,327	23.69%	2,020	36.06%	45	0.80%	67	1.20%	123	2.20%	5,602
Windsor	2,409	37.48%	1,302	20.26%	2,546	39.61%	79	1.23%	91	1.42%	-137	-2.13%	6,427
Totals	23,303	37.10%	15,350	24.44%	22,129	35.23%	1,095	1.74%	928	1.48%	1,174	!1.87%	62,805

==== Counties that flipped from Republican to Democratic ====
- Grand Isle

==== Counties that flipped from Republican to Progressive ====
- Caledonia
- Franklin
- Lamoille
- Orange
- Orleans
- Windsor

== Analysis ==
With Taft only winning 37.13% of the vote, he became the first Republican presidential candidate to win Vermont's popular vote with only a plurality. This was also the only time such occurred until Ronald Reagan won Vermont in 1980 with only a plurality of 44.37% of the popular vote. In addition, this was also one of only two times in the state's history (the other being George H. W. Bush's 3.52% victory margin in 1988) that Vermont was decided by a margin of less than 5.00%

Taft carried seven counties in Vermont to Roosevelt's six, while Wilson won only tiny Grand Isle County in the far northwest of the state, with a plurality of less than 40% of the vote. This was the first time that any county in Vermont voted Democratic in a presidential election since the birth of the Republican Party in 1854. This was the first time since Lewis Cass carried Washington County in 1848 that a Democrat had carried any of Vermont's counties, as well as the first time since Free Soil Party candidate John P. Hale won Lamoille County in 1852 that a third-party candidate carried any of Vermont's counties and the most recent time such has occurred to date. Consequently, this is the first election since the Republican Party's formation in 1854 that the party failed to win every county in the state.

Vermont was Wilson's weakest state in the nation in terms of percentage of the vote, and was one of only two states where Wilson finished as low as third in 1912, the other being Michigan where Roosevelt won and Wilson finished a much closer third behind Taft. Since 1912, there has been only one occasion (Bill Clinton in Utah in 1992) where a winning presidential candidate came in third in any of the states that had not seceded into the Confederate States of America. This was the first of two occasions since 1852 that Vermont did not vote for the same candidate as Maine (the other being 1968, when Richard Nixon won Vermont while Hubert Humphrey won Maine).

== See also ==
- United States presidential elections in Vermont
- 1912 United States presidential election in Utah - President William Howard Taft's other sole win in 1912
