= 1936 United States presidential election in Maine =

- November 3, 1936

Nominee	Alf Landon	Franklin D. Roosevelt
Party	Republican	Democratic
Home state	Kansas	New York
Running mate	Frank Knox	John Nance Garner
Electoral vote	5	0
Popular vote	168,823	126,333
Percentage	55.49%	41.52%
County results
Landon
50–60%
60–70%
70–80%
Roosevelt
40–50%
50–60%
60–70%
President before election
Franklin D. Roosevelt
Democratic
Elected President
Franklin D. Roosevelt
Democratic

The 1936 United States presidential election in Maine was held on November 3, 1936, as part of the 1936 United States presidential election. The state voters chose five electors to the Electoral College, who voted for president and vice president.

Maine voted for Republican Party candidate Alf Landon of Kansas, over Democratic Party candidate and incumbent President Franklin D. Roosevelt.

Landon won Maine by a margin of 13.97%, making it his best state in the Union, and with 55.49% of the popular vote, made it his second strongest state after nearby Vermont. Landon achieved this despite losing two counties (Washington and York) that had voted for Herbert Hoover in 1932, as he made gains of up to ten percent in the rock-ribbed Yankee counties of Hancock, Lincoln and Waldo.

Maine had been one of only 6 states to vote to re-elect Hoover, the embattled incumbent Republican president, over FDR in the latter's 1932 landslide, and in 1936, it was one of only two states in the entire nation (along with nearby Vermont) to vote for Alf Landon over the wildly popular Roosevelt. Maine and Vermont ultimately would be the only states to reject FDR in all four of his presidential campaigns.

== Results ==
1936 United States presidential election in Maine
Party	Candidate	Running mate	Popular vote		Electoral vote	
Party	Candidate	Running mate	Count	%	Count	%
Republican	Alf Landon of Kansas	Frank Knox of Illinois	168,823	55.49%	5	100.00%
Democratic	Franklin Delano Roosevelt of New York	John Nance Garner of Texas	126,333	41.52%	0	0.00%
Union	William Lemke of North Dakota	Thomas C. O'Brien of Massachusetts	7,581	2.49%	0	0.00%
Socialist	Norman Thomas of New York	George A. Nelson of Wisconsin	783	0.26%	0	0.00%
Prohibition	David Leigh Colvin of New York	Claude A. Watson of California	334	0.11%	0	0.00%
Communist	Earl Russell Browder of Kansas	James W. Ford of New York	257	0.08%	0	0.00%
Socialist Labor	John W. Aiken of Connecticut	Emil F. Teichert of New York	129	0.18%	0	0.00%
Total			304,240	100.00%	5	100.00%

=== Results by county ===
County	Alfred Mossman Landon Republican		Franklin Delano Roosevelt Democratic		William Frederick Lemke Union		Various candidates Other parties		Margin		Total votes cast
County	#	%	#	%	#	%	#	%	#	%	Total votes cast
Androscoggin	10,480	38.14%	16,657	60.62%	250	0.91%	90	0.33%	-6,177	-22.48%	27,477
Aroostook	14,708	64.69%	7,704	33.88%	218	0.96%	106	0.47%	7,004	30.81%	22,736
Cumberland	30,021	55.56%	22,895	42.37%	904	1.67%	210	0.39%	7,126	13.19%	54,030
Franklin	4,957	62.53%	2,859	36.06%	82	1.03%	30	0.38%	2,098	26.47%	7,928
Hancock	9,151	72.06%	3,315	26.10%	187	1.47%	47	0.37%	5,836	45.96%	12,700
Kennebec	14,987	55.34%	11,268	41.61%	706	2.61%	120	0.44%	3,719	13.73%	27,081
Knox	6,567	60.36%	3,991	36.69%	252	2.32%	69	0.63%	2,576	23.67%	10,879
Lincoln	5,252	72.62%	1,850	25.58%	87	1.20%	43	0.59%	3,402	47.04%	7,232
Oxford	8,778	57.13%	5,836	37.98%	619	4.03%	133	0.87%	2,942	19.15%	15,366
Penobscot	19,077	60.82%	9,732	31.03%	2,318	7.39%	241	0.77%	9,345	29.79%	31,368
Piscataquis	4,057	55.61%	3,051	41.82%	151	2.07%	36	0.49%	1,006	13.79%	7,295
Sagadahoc	3,707	51.99%	3,273	45.90%	125	1.75%	25	0.35%	434	6.09%	7,130
Somerset	7,558	56.91%	5,282	39.77%	334	2.51%	107	0.81%	2,276	17.14%	13,281
Waldo	5,309	64.97%	2,678	32.77%	159	1.95%	26	0.32%	2,631	32.20%	8,172
Washington	6,387	44.06%	7,925	54.67%	129	0.89%	54	0.37%	-1,538	-10.61%	14,495
York	17,827	48.09%	18,017	48.60%	1,060	2.86%	166	0.45%	-190	-0.51%	37,070
Totals	168,823	55.49%	126,333	41.52%	7,581	2.49%	1,503	0.49%	42,490	13.97%	304,240

==== Counties that flipped from Republican to Democratic ====
- Washington
- York

== See also ==
- United States presidential elections in Maine
- 1936 United States presidential election in Vermont - Alf Landon's other sole win in 1936
