= 2020 United States presidential election in Vermont =

- November 3, 2020
- Turnout: 73.27% ▲

Nominee	Joe Biden	Donald Trump
Party	Democratic	Republican
Home state	Delaware	Florida
Running mate	Kamala Harris	Mike Pence
Electoral vote	3	0
Popular vote	242,820	112,704
Percentage	66.09%	30.67%

Biden
40–50%
50–60%
60–70%
70–80%
80–90%
90–100%
Trump
40–50%
50–60%
60–70%
Tie/No data
President before election
Donald Trump
Republican
Elected President
Joe Biden
Democratic

The 2020 United States presidential election in Vermont was held on Tuesday, November 3, 2020, as part of the 2020 United States presidential election in which all 50 states plus the District of Columbia participated. Vermont voters chose electors to represent them in the Electoral College via a popular vote, pitting the Republican Party's nominee, incumbent President Donald Trump, and running mate Vice President Mike Pence against Democratic Party nominee, former Vice President Joe Biden, and his running mate California Senator Kamala Harris. Vermont has three electoral votes in the Electoral College.

Biden easily emerged victorious in the Green Mountain State 66.09% to 30.67%, a margin of 35.4%. This is the first time Vermont was the strongest state for either party since 1956, when it was Republican Dwight D. Eisenhower's best state. Vermont also saw the largest increase in turnout from 2016, increasing 14.3%. Biden greatly improved on Hillary Clinton's 55.7% vote share and 25.9% margin from 2016, when third-party candidates received over 14% of the vote; with an improvement of 9% in the margin of victory, this marked the strongest leftward shift any state experienced in 2020. Biden's performance was also the fourth-strongest Democratic performance in state history, as well as the third-largest Democratic margin of victory. Trump carried only one county, sparsely populated Essex bordering New Hampshire, which had voted for the winner from 1980 to 2016. Consequently, Biden became the first president to win without the county since Jimmy Carter in 1976.

Another factor for Biden's improvement was strong support from Bernie Sanders, one of the state's U.S. Senators and a former candidate for the 2020 Democratic nomination who, despite endorsing Hillary Clinton, had received 5.7% of the vote in 2016 as a non-soliciting write-in candidate. Per exit polls by the Associated Press, Sanders maintained a 63% approval rating among his constituents, and his supporters broke 93% for Biden.

== Background ==
Vermont was once one of the most Republican states in the nation. From 1856 to 1988, it voted Republican in every election except Lyndon Johnson's 44-state landslide in 1964. However, the brand of Republicanism practiced in Vermont has historically been a moderate one. Coupled with an influx of more liberal newcomers from out of state, this made Vermont considerably friendlier to Democrats as the national GOP moved further to the right.

After narrowly supporting George H. W. Bush in 1988, Vermont gave Bill Clinton a 16-point margin in 1992. Republicans have not seriously contested the state since then, and Vermont is now reckoned as part of the "Blue Wall"–the 19 jurisdictions that delivered their electoral votes to the Democratic standard-bearer at every election from 1992 to 2012, and again in 2020. Underlining how Republican Vermont once was, Trump and George W. Bush are the only Republicans to win the White House without carrying Vermont.

== Primary elections ==
=== Republican primary ===
The Republican primary was held on March 3, 2020. Donald Trump and Bill Weld were among the declared Republican candidates.

2020 Vermont Republican primary
Candidate	Votes	%	Delegates
Donald Trump (incumbent)	33,984	86.49	17
Bill Weld	3,971	10.11	0
Rocky De La Fuente	341	0.87	0
Write-ins	480	1.22	0
Overvotes	37	0.09	0
Blank votes	478	1.22	0
Total	39,291	100%	17

=== Democratic primary ===
The Democratic primary was held on March 3, 2020. Bernie Sanders, one of the two current senators from Vermont and a 2016 Democratic primary candidate, declared his candidacy on February 19, 2019, after speculation he would do so. Joe Biden, Michael Bloomberg, and Elizabeth Warren were among the other major declared candidates.

Popular vote share by county Sanders—40–50% Sanders—50–60%

2020 Vermont Democratic presidential primary
Candidate	Votes	%	Delegates
Bernie Sanders	79,921	50.57	11
Joe Biden	34,669	21.94	5
Elizabeth Warren	19,785	12.52	
Michael Bloomberg	14,828	9.38	
Pete Buttigieg (withdrawn) (Note: Candidate withdrew during absentee voting, shortly before the primary.)	3,709	2.35	
Amy Klobuchar (withdrawn)	1,991	1.26	
Tulsi Gabbard	1,303	0.82	
Andrew Yang (withdrawn) (Note: Candidate withdrew following the New Hampshire primary, when absentee voting had already begun.)	591	0.37	
Tom Steyer (withdrawn)	202	0.13	
Deval Patrick (withdrawn)	137	0.09	
Marianne Williamson (withdrawn)	135	0.09	
Donald Trump (write-in Republican)	83	0.05	
Julian Castro (withdrawn)	52	0.03	
Hillary Clinton (write-in)	5	0.00	
Michael Bennet (write-in)	3	0.00	
Other candidates / Write-in	(Note: Including "Blank" (written in) with 8 votes; Ron Paul, Michelle Obama, John Edwards and two others with 2 votes; and 110 other write-ins with 1 vote)238	0.15	
Overvotes / Blank votes	(Note: 57 overvotes and 323 blank votes)380	0.24	
Total	158,032	100%	16

== General election ==
=== Predictions ===
Source	Ranking	As of
The Cook Political Report	Safe D	September 10, 2020
Inside Elections	Safe D	September 4, 2020
Sabato's Crystal Ball	Safe D	July 14, 2020
Politico	Safe D	September 8, 2020
RCP	Safe D	August 3, 2020
Niskanen	Safe D	July 26, 2020
CNN	Safe D	August 3, 2020
The Economist	Safe D	September 2, 2020
CBS News	Likely D	August 16, 2020
270towin	Safe D	August 2, 2020
ABC News	Safe D	July 31, 2020
NPR	Likely D	August 3, 2020
NBC News	Safe D	August 6, 2020
538	Safe D	September 9, 2020

=== Polling ===
Aggregate polls

Source of poll aggregation	Dates administered	Dates updated	Joe Biden Democratic	Donald Trump Republican	Other/ Undecided (Note: Calculated by taking the difference of 100% and all other candidates combined.)	Margin
FiveThirtyEight	until November 2, 2020	November 3, 2020	66.5%	27.8%	5.7%	Biden +38.7

Polls

Poll source	Date(s) administered	Sample size (Note: Key: A – all adults RV – registered voters LV – likely voters V – unclear)	Margin of error	Donald Trump Republican	Joe Biden Democratic	Jo Jorgensen Libertarian	Howie Hawkins Green	Other	Undecided
SurveyMonkey/Axios	Oct 20 – Nov 2, 2020	906 (LV)	± 4.5%	26% (Note: Overlapping sample with the previous SurveyMonkey/Axios poll, but more information available regarding sample size)	71%	-	-	–	–
co/efficient/Scott Milne for Lt. Governor (Note: Poll sponsored by Milne's campaign in the 2020 Vermont lieutenant gubernatorial election)	Oct 19–29, 2020	584 (LV)	± 4.05%	32%	62%	-	-	–	6%
SurveyMonkey/Axios	Oct 1–28, 2020	1,167 (LV)	–	29%	69%	-	-	–	–
SurveyMonkey/Axios	Sep 1–30, 2020	427 (LV)	–	34%	64%	-	-	–	2%
Braun Research/VPR	Sep 3–15, 2020	582 (LV)	± 4%	32%	56%	-	-	8% (Note: "Someone else" with 6%"; "None of the above" with 2%)	3%
SurveyMonkey/Axios	Aug 1–31, 2020	236 (LV)	–	29%	70%	-	-	–	0%
SurveyMonkey/Axios	Jul 1–31, 2020	368 (LV)	–	27%	71%	-	-	–	2%
SurveyMonkey/Axios	Jun 8–30, 2020	113 (LV)	–	20%	75%	-	-	–	5%

=== Results ===
2020 United States presidential election in Vermont
Party	Candidate	Votes	%	±%
Democratic	Joe Biden Kamala Harris	242,820	66.09%	+10.37%
Republican	Donald Trump Mike Pence	112,704	30.67%	+0.91%
Libertarian	Jo Jorgensen Spike Cohen	3,608	0.98%	−2.16%
Green	Howie Hawkins Angela Walker	1,310	0.36%	−1.75%
Independent	Kanye West Michelle Tidball	1,269	0.35%	N/A
Grumpy Old Patriots	H. Brooke Paige Thomas Witman	1,175	0.32%	N/A
Independent	Christopher LaFontaine Michael Speed	856	0.23%	N/A
Independent	Bernie Sanders (write-in)	619	0.17%	−5.51%
Independent	Richard Duncan Mitch Bupp	213	0.06%	N/A
American Solidarity	Brian Carroll Amar Patel	209	0.06%	N/A
Constitution	Don Blankenship William Mohr	208	0.06%	+0.04%
Socialist Workers	Alyson Kennedy Malcolm Jarrett	195	0.05%	N/A
Liberty Union	Gloria La Riva Sunil Freeman	166	0.05%	−0.05%
Boiling Frog	Gary Swing David Olszta	141	0.04%	N/A
Prohibition	Phil Collins Billy Joe Parker	137	0.04%	N/A
Bull Moose	Keith McCormic Sam Blasiak	126	0.03%	N/A
Independent	Brock Pierce Karla Ballard	100	0.03%	N/A
Bread and Roses	Jerome Segal John De Graaf	65	0.02%	N/A
Approval Voting	Blake Huber Frank Atwood	54	0.01%	N/A
Independent	Kyle Kopitke Taja Ivanow	53	0.01%	N/A
Alliance	Rocky De La Fuente Darcy Richardson	48	0.01%	N/A
Independent	Zachary Scalf Matthew Lyda	29	0.01%	N/A
Write-in		1,942	0.53%	-0.93%
Total votes		367,428	100.00%	N/A

==== By county ====
County	Joe Biden Democratic		Donald Trump Republican		Various candidates Other parties		Margin		Total votes cast
County	#	%	#	%	#	%	#	%	Total votes cast
Addison	14,967	67.96%	6,292	28.57%	136	3.47%	8,675	39.39%	22,022
Bennington	12,705	62.09%	7,114	34.77%	643	3.14%	5,591	27.32%	20,462
Caledonia	9,011	55.73%	6,551	40.52%	607	3.75%	2,460	15.21%	16,169
Chittenden	74,961	75.78%	21,017	21.25%	2,937	2.97%	53,944	54.53%	98,915
Essex	1,405	42.73%	1,773	53.92%	110	3.35%	-368	-11.19%	3,288
Franklin	13,611	52.69%	11,274	43.65%	945	3.66%	2,337	9.04%	25,830
Grand Isle	2,905	59.88%	1,810	37.31%	763	2.81%	1,095	22.57%	4,851
Lamoille	10,240	68.66%	4,163	27.91%	512	3.43%	6,077	40.75%	14,915
Orange	10,304	60.18%	6,187	36.13%	631	3.69%	4,117	24.05%	17,122
Orleans	7,147	50.70%	6,512	46.20%	437	3.10%	635	4.50%	14,096
Rutland	18,230	53.66%	14,672	43.19%	1,068	3.15%	3,558	10.47%	33,970
Washington	25,191	71.35%	8,928	25.29%	1,188	3.36%	16,263	46.06%	35,307
Windham	18,767	72.08%	6,440	24.74%	828	3.18%	12,327	47.34%	26,035
Windsor	23,376	67.86%	9,971	28.95%	1,099	3.19%	13,405	38.91%	34,446
Totals	242,820	66.09%	112,704	30.67%	11,904	3.24%	130,116	35.42%	367,428

==== By congressional district ====
Due to the state's low population, only one congressional district is allocated. This district, called the at-large district because it covers the entire state, is thus equivalent to the statewide election results.

District	Trump	Biden	Representative
At-large	30.67%	66.09%	Peter Welch

== Notes ==
Partisan clients

== See also ==
- United States presidential elections in Vermont
- 2020 United States presidential election
- 2020 Democratic Party presidential primaries
- 2020 Republican Party presidential primaries
- 2020 United States elections
