= 1936 United States presidential election in Vermont =

- November 3, 1936

Nominee	Alf Landon	Franklin D. Roosevelt
Party	Republican	Democratic
Home state	Kansas	New York
Running mate	Frank Knox	John Nance Garner
Electoral vote	3	0
Popular vote	81,023	62,124
Percentage	56.39%	43.24%

Landon
50–60%
60–70%
70–80%
80–90%
90–100%
Roosevelt
50–60%
60–70%
70–80%
90–100%
Tie
40–50%
50%
President before election
Franklin D. Roosevelt
Democratic
Elected President
Franklin D. Roosevelt
Democratic

The 1936 United States presidential election in Vermont took place on November 3, 1936, as part of the 1936 United States presidential election which was held throughout all contemporary 48 states. Voters chose three representatives, or electors to the Electoral College, who voted for president and vice president.

Vermont voted for the Republican nominee, Kansas Governor Alf Landon, over the Democratic nominee, incumbent President Franklin D. Roosevelt of New York. Landon's running mate was newspaper publisher Frank Knox of Illinois, while Roosevelt ran with incumbent Vice President John Nance Garner of Texas.

Landon took 56.39% of the vote, to Roosevelt's 43.24%, a margin of 13.15%.

Vermont historically was a bastion of Northeastern Republicanism, and by 1936 it had gone Republican in every presidential election since the founding of the Republican Party. From 1856 to 1932, Vermont had had the longest streak of voting Republican of any state, having never voted Democratic before, and this tradition continued even in the midst of a nationwide Democratic landslide in 1936. It would not vote Democratic until 1964.

Vermont had been one of only six states to vote to re-elect embattled incumbent Republican President Herbert Hoover over FDR in the latter's 1932 landslide, and in 1936, it was one of only two states in the entire nation (along with nearby Maine) to vote for Alf Landon over the wildly popular Roosevelt. Vermont and Maine ultimately would be the only states to reject FDR in all four of his presidential campaigns.

In terms of vote share, Vermont was the most Republican state in the nation, and in terms of margin, it was the second most Republican state after Maine, as populist William Lemke cut into the two-party vote in Maine but was not on the ballot in Vermont. Vermont would weigh in as a whopping 37% more Republican than the national average in the 1936 election.

Landon carried eleven of the state's fourteen counties, breaking 60% in seven. However, the three northwestern counties of Vermont had become Democratic enclaves in an otherwise Republican state, and Roosevelt once again won Chittenden, Franklin and Grand Isle counties for the Democrats. As of 2024, this is the last time that the towns of Glastenbury and Somerset voted Republican, as well as the last time that either town cast any votes in a presidential election, as every subsequent election from 1940 onwards would see neither town cast any votes for president.

== Results ==
1936 United States presidential election in Vermont
Party	Candidate	Votes	Percentage	Electoral votes
Republican	Alfred Landon	81,023	56.39%	3
Democratic	Franklin D. Roosevelt (incumbent)	62,124	43.24%	0
Communist	Earl Browder	405	0.28%	0
N/A	Write-ins	137	0.10%	0
Totals		143,689	100.00%	3

=== Results by county ===
County	Alfred Mossman Landon Republican		Franklin Delano Roosevelt Democratic		Various candidates Other parties		Margin		Total votes cast
County	#	%	#	%	#	%	#	%	Total votes cast
Addison	5,161	65.90%	2,646	33.79%	24	0.31%	2,515	32.12%	7,831
Bennington	5,515	56.08%	4,166	42.36%	153	1.56%	1,349	13.72%	9,834
Caledonia	6,054	64.25%	3,342	35.47%	27	0.29%	2,712	28.78%	9,423
Chittenden	7,757	41.32%	10,962	58.39%	56	0.30%	-3,205	-17.07%	18,775
Essex	1,474	55.00%	1,203	44.89%	3	0.11%	271	10.11%	2,680
Franklin	5,507	44.56%	6,817	55.15%	36	0.29%	-1,310	-10.60%	12,360
Grand Isle	712	45.41%	852	54.34%	4	0.26%	-140	-8.93%	1,568
Lamoille	2,846	68.79%	1,279	30.92%	12	0.29%	1,567	37.88%	4,137
Orange	4,956	73.28%	1,796	26.56%	11	0.16%	3,160	46.72%	6,763
Orleans	5,038	65.26%	2,662	34.48%	20	0.26%	2,376	30.78%	7,720
Rutland	10,794	52.94%	9,543	46.80%	54	0.26%	1,251	6.14%	20,391
Washington	8,351	50.67%	8,073	48.99%	56	0.34%	278	1.69%	16,480
Windham	7,369	66.42%	3,699	33.34%	27	0.24%	3,670	33.08%	11,095
Windsor	9,489	64.90%	5,084	34.77%	49	0.34%	4,405	30.13%	14,622
Totals	81,023	56.39%	62,124	43.24%	532	0.37%	18,899	13.15%	143,679

== See also ==
- United States presidential elections in Vermont
- 1936 United States presidential election in Maine - Alf Landon's other sole win in 1936
