= 1856 United States presidential election in Vermont =

- November 4, 1856
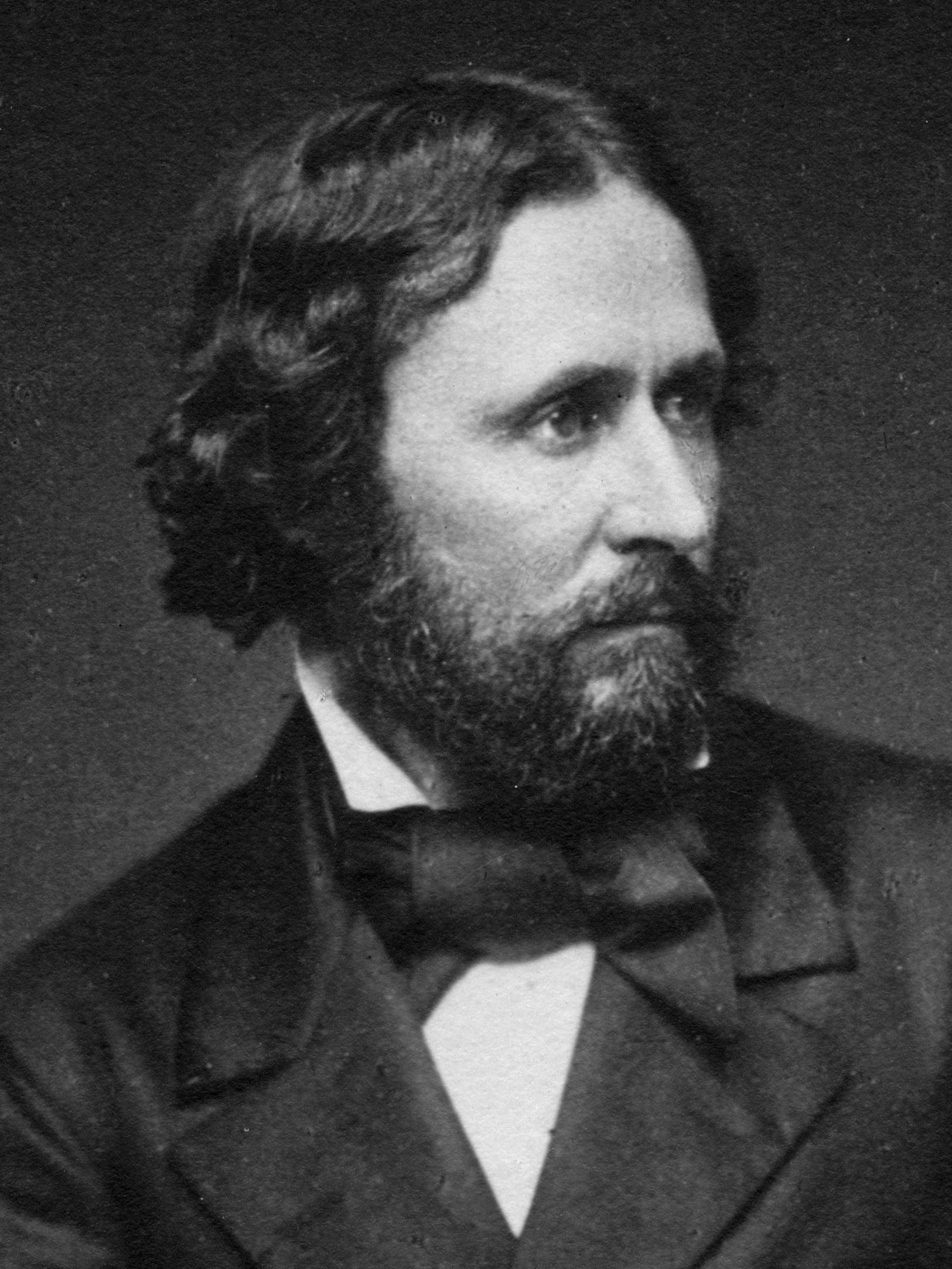

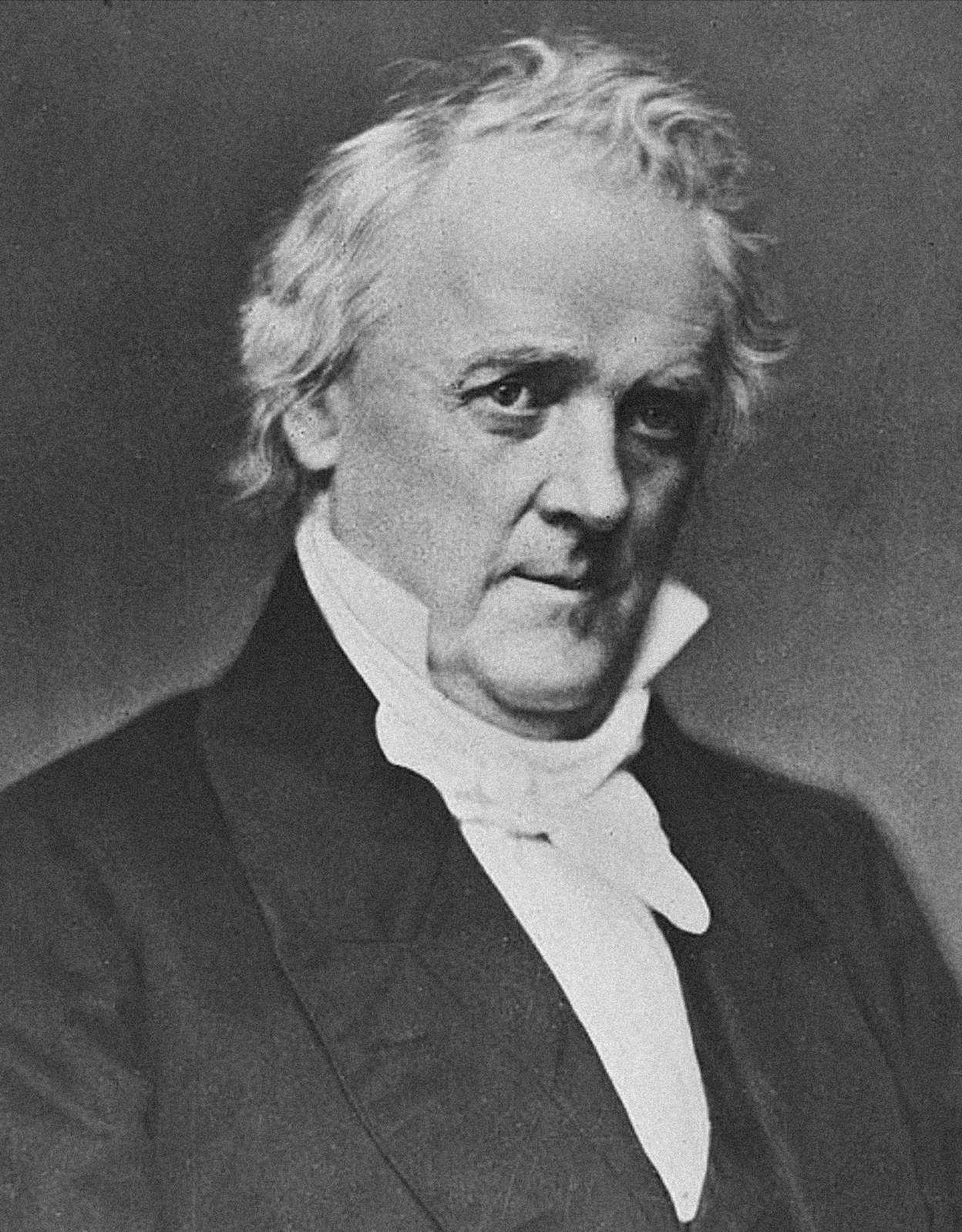
Nominee	John C. Frémont	James Buchanan
Party	Republican	Democratic
Home state	California	Pennsylvania
Running mate	William L. Dayton	John C. Breckinridge
Electoral vote	5	0
Popular vote	39,561	10,577
Percentage	77.96%	20.84%

Frémont
50–60%
60–70%
70–80%
80–90%
90–100%
Buchanan
50–60%
60–70%
80–90%
Tie
50%
President before election
Franklin Pierce
Democratic
Elected President
James Buchanan
Democratic

The 1856 United States presidential election in Vermont took place on November 4, 1856, as part of the 1856 United States presidential election. Voters chose five representatives, or electors to the Electoral College, who voted for president and vice president.

Vermont voted for the Republican candidate, John C. Frémont, over the Democratic candidate, James Buchanan, and the Know Nothing candidate, Millard Fillmore. Frémont won the state by a margin of 57.12%.

With 77.96% of the popular vote, Vermont would be his strongest victory in the Union in terms of percentage in the popular vote.

Frémont's victory also started the 104-year-long streak of Republican presidential candidate victories in Vermont, which would last for 27 consecutive presidential elections from 1856 through 1960—as of 2020, still tied with Georgia from 1852 to 1960 for the most of any state. A Democratic presidential candidate would not win Vermont until Lyndon B. Johnson won the state against Barry Goldwater 108 years later in 1964.

== Results ==
1856 United States presidential election in Vermont
Party	Candidate	Votes	%
Republican	John C. Frémont	39,561	77.96%
Democratic	James Buchanan	10,577	20.84%
Know Nothing	Millard Fillmore	545	1.07%
Total votes		50,683	100%

=== By county ===
Results by county
County	John C. Frémont Republican		James Buchanan Democratic		Millard Fillmore Know Nothing		Total
County	#	%	#	%	#	%	Total
Addison	3,362	89.32%	334	8.87%	68	1.81%	3,764
Bennington	2,120	71.26%	785	26.39%	70	2.35%	2,975
Caledonia	2,540	70.09%	1,061	29.28%	23	0.63%	3,624
Chittenden	2,844	78.89%	688	19.08%	73	2.02%	3,605
Essex	622	69.11%	274	30.44%	4	0.44%	900
Franklin	2,454	72.41%	870	25.67%	65	1.92%	3,389
Grand Isle	405	80.04%	92	18.18%	9	1.78%	506
Lamoille	1,608	79.49%	402	19.87%	13	0.64%	2,023
Orange	3,207	69.24%	1,364	29.45%	61	1.32%	4,632
Orleans	2,007	80.06%	494	19.70%	6	0.24%	2,507
Rutland	4,798	84.59%	839	14.79%	35	0.62%	5,672
Washington	3,821	73.69%	1,359	26.21%	5	0.10%	5,185
Windham	4,068	83.76%	742	15.28%	47	0.97%	4,857
Windsor	5,707	80.97%	1,275	18.09%	66	0.94%	7,048
Totals	39,563	78.05%	10,579	20.87%	545	1.08%	50,687

==== Counties that flipped from Free Soil to Republican ====
- Lamoille

==== Counties that flipped from Whig to Republican ====
- Addison
- Bennington
- Caledonia
- Chittenden
- Essex
- Franklin
- Grand Isle
- Orange
- Orleans
- Rutland
- Washington
- Windham
- Windsor

== See also ==
- United States presidential elections in Vermont
