= 2012 United States presidential election in Vermont =

- November 6, 2012

Nominee	Barack Obama	Mitt Romney
Party	Democratic	Republican
Home state	Illinois	Massachusetts
Running mate	Joe Biden	Paul Ryan
Electoral vote	3	0
Popular vote	199,239	92,698
Percentage	66.57%	30.97%

Obama
40–50%
50–60%
60–70%
70–80%
80–90%
Romney
50–60%
No data
President before election
Barack Obama
Democratic
Elected President
Barack Obama
Democratic

The 2012 United States presidential election in Vermont took place on November 6, 2012, as part of the 2012 United States presidential election in which all 50 states plus the District of Columbia participated. Vermont voters chose three electors to represent them in the Electoral College via a popular vote pitting incumbent Democratic President Barack Obama and his running mate, Vice President Joe Biden, against Republican challenger and former Massachusetts Governor Mitt Romney and his running mate, U.S. Representative Paul Ryan.

A very liberal Northeastern state, and a former bastion of progressive Republicanism until the realignment election of 1992, Vermont was the second most Democratic state in the nation, weighing in as a whopping 31.74% more Democratic than the national average in the 2012 election. Repeating his success from 2008, Obama again carried Vermont in a landslide, taking 66.57% of the vote to Romney's 30.97%, a Democratic victory margin of 35.60%. Though this was slightly worse than his 2008 performance, when he received 67.46% of the vote to Republican Senator John McCain's 30.45%, a margin of 37.01%, this was still the second best performance for a Democrat in Vermont history, surpassing Lyndon B. Johnson's 1964 performance.

Vermont historically was a bastion of northeastern Republicanism, voting Republican in every single election but one between 1856 and 1988, interrupted only in 1964. It also elected solely Republican governors from 1854 to 1962 and solely Republican Senators from 1855 to 1968. However, after migration from liberal northeastern cities such as Boston and New York to Vermont in the 1960s and 70s, it shifted sharply towards the Democratic Party with Bill Clinton's landslide victory in 1992, and has been part of the "Blue Wall" – the 19 jurisdictions, worth 238 electoral votes, that voted Democratic six times in a row from 1992 through 2012 – ever since. Vermont also has one of the greenest economies in the country, with its own Clean Air Act and a state trust that buys farmland to support local farming. This, and a virtual nonexistence of party loyalty in the state, guaranteed Obama's landslide victory.

Obama's best performance was in Windham County, where he received 73.05% of the vote, though he also racked up great margins in Chittenden, Rutland, and Washington Counties, the state's three largest counties and home to Burlington, Rutland, and the state capital of Montpelier, respectively. The only county where he won by a margin of less than 20% is in Essex County in the Northeast Kingdom, generally the most conservative region in the state, where he won by 13.40%.

The results of the 2012 election made Vermont the second most Democratic state in the nation, only surpassed by the 42.71% margin in Obama's birth state of Hawaii. As of the 2024 presidential election, this is the last time in which the Democratic nominee won Essex County, and by extension, every county in the state.

To date, this is the last time that the towns of Baltimore, Belvidere, Benson, Berkshire, Bloomfield, Brighton, Brownington, Brunswick, Canaan, Charleston, Clarendon, Concord, Coventry, Danby, Derby, Eden, Fair Haven, Franklin, Granby, Groton, Guildhall, Highgate, Holland, Ira, Irasburg, Lowell, Lunenburg, Newport, Norton, Orange, Readsboro, Richford, Searsburg, Sheldon, Stamford, Sutton, Topsham, Troy, Victory, Wells, West Rutland, and Williamstown voted Democratic.

== Primary elections ==
=== Democratic primary ===
The Democratic primary took place on Super Tuesday, March 6, 2012. Incumbent President Barack Obama ran unopposed. According to the Secretary of State of Vermont's office, he received 40,247 votes (97.28%) and all of the 27 delegates attending the 2012 Democratic National Convention in Charlotte, North Carolina pledged to support his re-nomination. The remaining 2.72% of the vote was made up of 675 write-ins (1.63%) and 450 blank votes (1.09%).

=== Republican primary ===
2012 Vermont Republican primary
- March 6, 2012

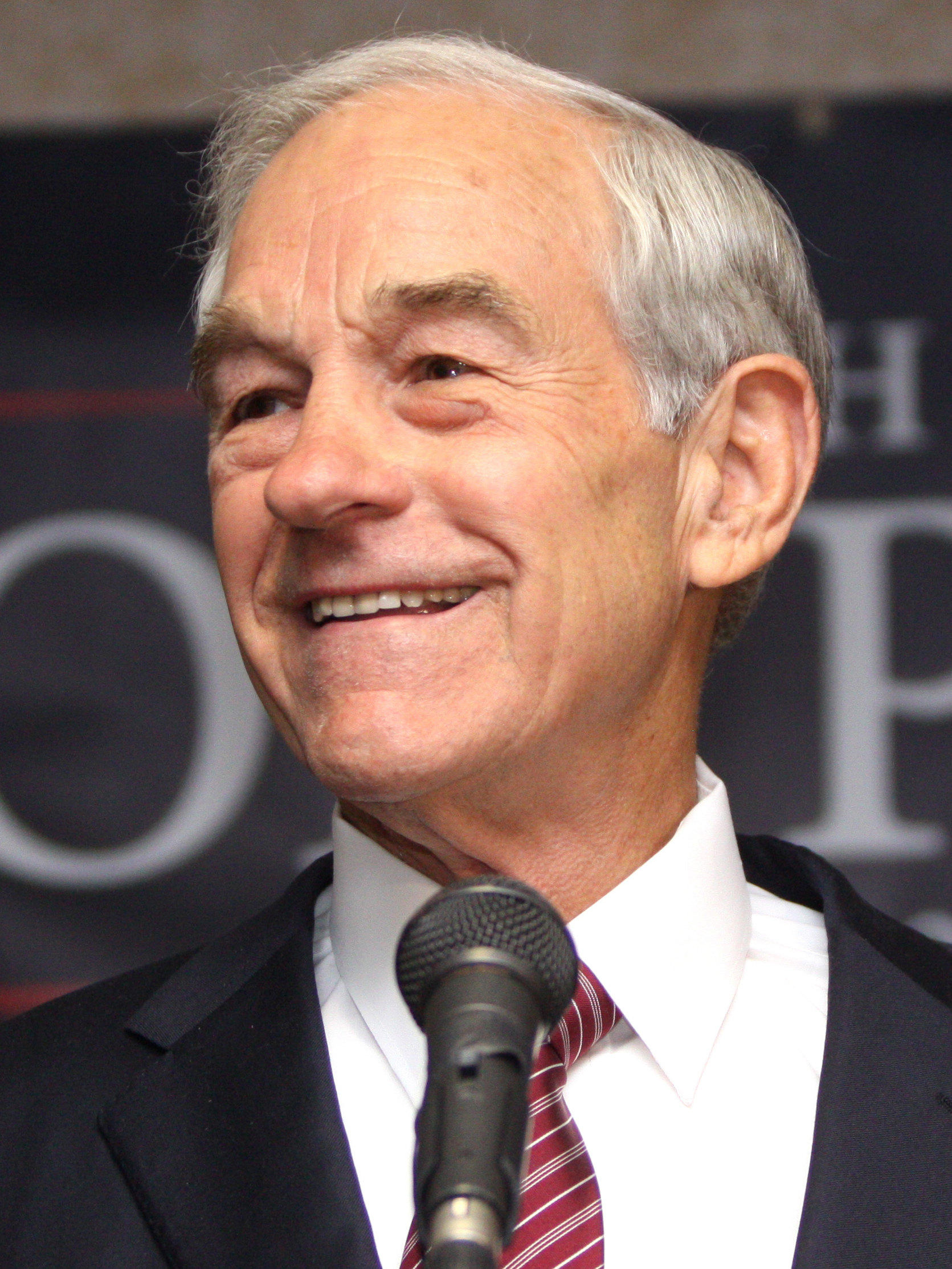

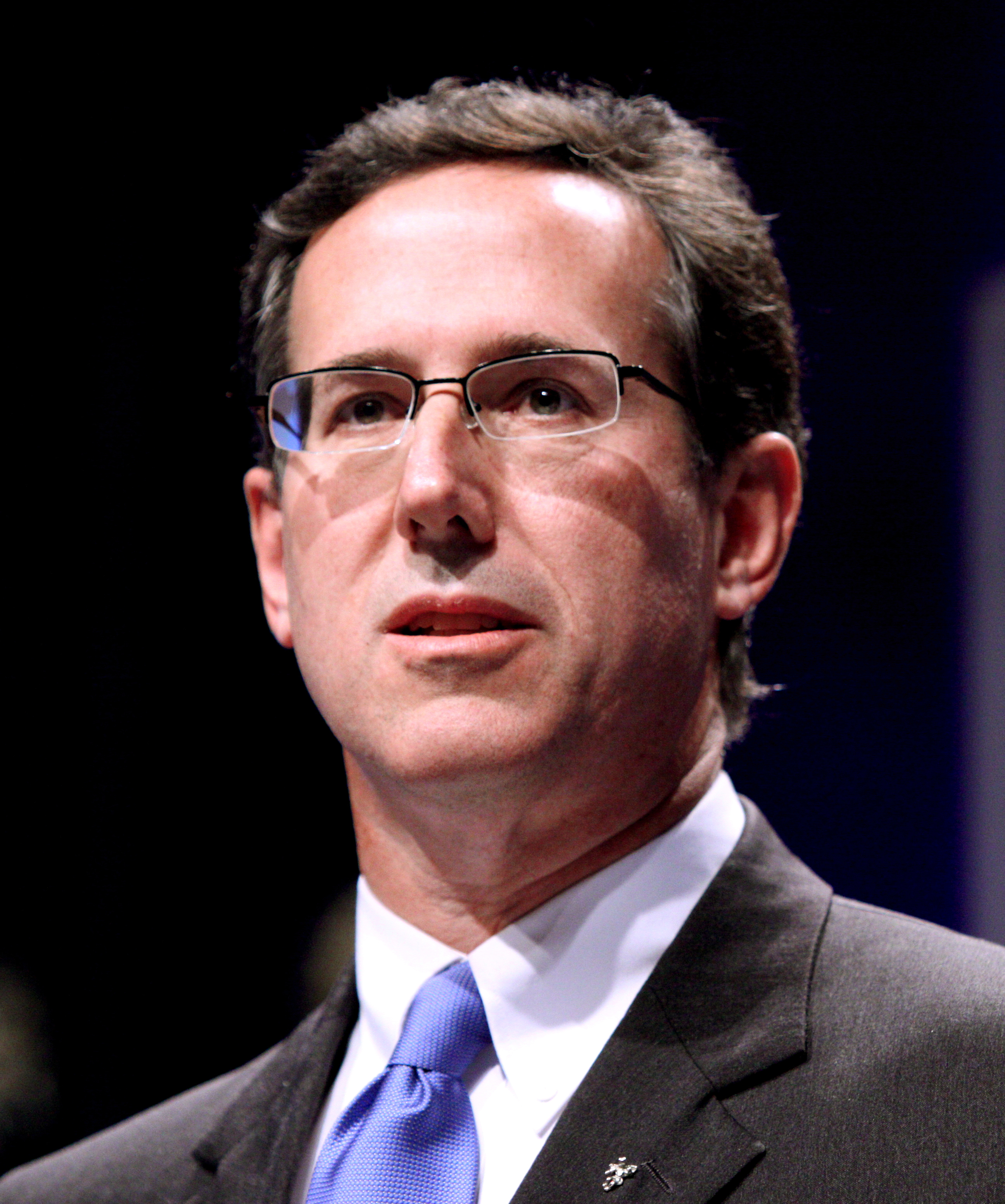

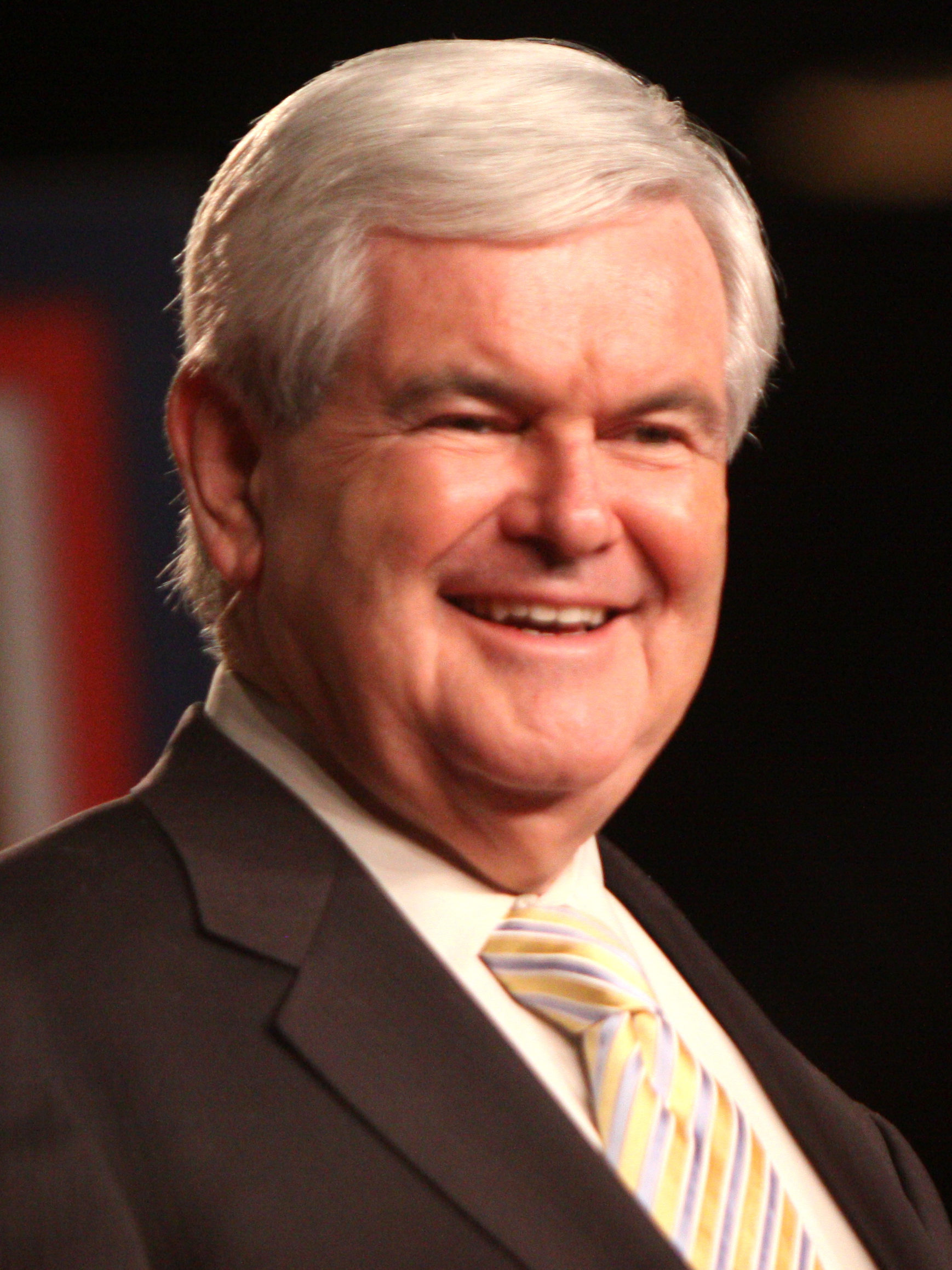
Candidate	Mitt Romney	Ron Paul
Home state	Massachusetts	Texas
Delegate count	9	4
Popular vote	24,008	15,391
Percentage	39.45%	25.29%
Candidate	Rick Santorum	Newt Gingrich
Home state	Pennsylvania	Georgia
Delegate count	4	0
Popular vote	14,368	4,949
Percentage	23.61%	8.13%
- Mitt Romney Ron Paul Rick Santorum

The Republican primary also took place on Super Tuesday, March 6, 2012.

Vermont has 17 delegates to the 2012 Republican National Convention. Three superdelegates are bound by the primary results and awarded on a winner-take-all basis. The remaining 14 are awarded winner-take-all to the candidate who wins at least 50% of the vote statewide, or allocated proportionately among candidates winning at least 20% of the vote statewide if no one gets a majority.

Former Massachusetts Governor Mitt Romney won the primary with a plurality, receiving 24,008 votes (39.45%) and 9 delegates. He won every single county. Representative from Texas's 14th district Ron Paul placed in second with 15,391 votes, or 25.29%, while former Senator from Pennsylvania Rick Santorum received 14,368 votes, or 23.61%. Both were awarded 4 delegates. The only other candidate to receive over 5% of the vote was former Speaker of the House Newt Gingrich, with 8.13% of the vote.

Vermont Republican presidential primary, March 6, 2012
Candidate	Votes	Percentage	Delegates
Mitt Romney	24,008	39.45%	9
Ron Paul	15,391	25.29%	4
Rick Santorum	14,368	23.61%	4
Newt Gingrich	4,949	8.13%	0
Jon Huntsman	1,198	1.97%	0
Rick Perry	544	0.89%	0
Write-in	392	0.64%	0
Unprojected delegates:			0
Total:	60,850	100.00%	17

== General election ==
=== Predictions ===
Source	Ranking	As of
Huffington Post	Safe D	November 6, 2012
CNN	Safe D	November 6, 2012
New York Times	Safe D	November 6, 2012
Washington Post	Safe D	November 6, 2012
RealClearPolitics	Solid D	November 6, 2012
Sabato's Crystal Ball	Solid D	November 5, 2012
FiveThirtyEight	Solid D	November 6, 2012

=== Candidate ballot access ===
- Barack Obama / Joe Biden, Democratic
- Mitt Romney / Paul Ryan, Republican
- Gary Earl Johnson / James Polin Gray, Libertarian
- Rocky Anderson / Luis J. Rodriguez, Justice
- Peta Lindsay / Yari Osorio, Socialism and Liberation

The following candidates had write-in ballot access:

- Ron Paul, Republican
- Jill Stein / Cheri Honkala, Green
- Virgil Goode / Jim Clymer, Constitution
- Roseanne Barr / Cindy Sheehan, Peace and Freedom

=== Results ===
2012 United States presidential election in Vermont
Party	Candidate	Running mate	Votes	Percentage	Electoral votes
Democratic	Barack Obama (incumbent)	Joe Biden (incumbent)	199,239	66.57%	3
Republican	Mitt Romney	Paul Ryan	92,698	30.97%	0
Libertarian	Gary Johnson	Jim Gray	3,487	1.17%	0
Write-ins*	Write-ins		2,043	0.68%	0
Justice	Rocky Anderson	Luis J. Rodriguez	1,128	0.38%	0
Socialism and Liberation	Peta Lindsay	Yari Osorio	695	0.23%	0
Totals			299,290	100.00%	3

- Write-ins included Ron Paul, Republican; and Jill Stein, Green.

==== By county ====
County	Barack Obama Democratic		Mitt Romney Republican		Various candidates Other parties		Margin		Total votes cast
County	#	%	#	%	#	%	#	%	Total votes cast
Addison	12,257	68.44%	5,203	29.05%	450	2.51%	7,054	39.39%	17,910
Bennington	11,514	65.45%	5,687	32.33%	392	2.22%	5,827	33.12%	17,593
Caledonia	8,192	59.97%	5,088	37.24%	381	2.79%	3,104	22.73%	13,661
Chittenden	53,626	69.57%	21,571	27.99%	1,883	2.44%	32,055	41.58%	77,080
Essex	1,539	55.00%	1,164	41.60%	95	3.40%	375	13.40%	2,798
Franklin	12,057	60.62%	7,405	37.23%	426	2.15%	4,652	23.39%	19,888
Grand Isle	2,531	62.11%	1,471	36.10%	73	1.79%	1,060	26.01%	4,075
Lamoille	8,371	69.83%	3,342	27.88%	275	2.29%	5,029	41.95%	11,988
Orange	9,076	64.58%	4,588	32.65%	389	2.77%	4,488	31.93%	14,053
Orleans	7,117	60.87%	4,306	36.83%	269	2.30%	2,811	24.04%	11,692
Rutland	17,088	59.73%	10,835	37.87%	686	2.40%	6,253	21.86%	28,609
Washington	20,351	69.44%	8,093	27.61%	863	2.95%	12,258	41.83%	29,307
Windham	16,026	73.05%	5,347	24.37%	564	2.58%	10,679	48.68%	21,937
Windsor	19,494	67.93%	8,598	29.96%	607	2.11%	10,896	37.97%	28,699
Totals	199,239	66.57%	92,698	30.97%	7,353	2.46%	106,541	35.60%	299,290

==== By congressional district ====
Due to the state's low population, only one congressional district is allocated. This district, called the at-large district because it covers the entire state, is thus equivalent to the statewide election results.

District	Romney	Obama	Representative
At-large	30.97%	66.57%	Peter Welch

== See also ==
- 2012 Republican Party presidential debates and forums
- 2012 Republican Party presidential primaries
- Results of the 2012 Republican Party presidential primaries
- Vermont Republican Party
- United States presidential elections in Vermont
