= 1984 United States presidential election in Vermont =

- November 6, 1984

Nominee	Ronald Reagan	Walter Mondale
Party	Republican	Democratic
Alliance		Progressive
Home state	California	Minnesota
Running mate	George H. W. Bush	Geraldine Ferraro
Electoral vote	3	0
Popular vote	135,865	95,730
Percentage	57.92%	40.81%

Reagan
40–50%
50–60%
60–70%
70–80%
80–90%
Mondale
40–50%
50–60%
60–70%
President before election
Ronald Reagan
Republican
Elected President
Ronald Reagan
Republican

The 1984 United States presidential election in Vermont took place on November 6, 1984, as part of the 1984 United States presidential election, which was held throughout all 50 states and D.C. Voters chose three representatives, or electors to the Electoral College, who voted for president and vice president.

Vermont voted for incumbent Republican President Ronald Reagan over Democratic former Vice President Walter Mondale, by a margin of 17.11%, with Reagan taking 57.92% of the vote to Mondale's 40.81%. This result nonetheless made Vermont 1.1% more Democratic than the nation-at-large. Along with running as a Democrat, Mondale would also be supported by the Vermont Progressive Party.

1984 would prove to be the last election in which Vermont stayed safely in Republican hands. It would go on to become a swing state in the next election, and eventually one of the most heavily Democratic states in the nation after the 1992 election and especially the 2004 election.

While Reagan won the state comfortably, the Republican Party's shift to the right under his leadership greatly weakened its standing in Vermont, which was home to a very large number of liberal and moderate Republicans. Between 1856 and 1960, Vermont had been the most reliably Republican state in the nation, and prior to Reagan, had voted more Republican than the nation in every election except 1964 (when another staunch conservative, Barry Goldwater, was the Republican nominee).

However, 1984 was the second consecutive election in which the state weighed in as more Democratic than the nation. Nevertheless, Reagan's 135,865 votes are the most received by a Republican presidential candidate in the state's history. As of the 2024 presidential election, this is the last time in which a Republican presidential nominee carried every county in Vermont, and the last when the GOP carried Addison, Chittenden, Franklin, Grand Isle and Windham Counties.

== Democratic Primary ==
Gary Hart won the non-binding primary on March 6. None of the candidates campaigned in the primary. M. Jerome Diamond and Nola Denslow co-chaired Hart's campaign in Vermont. Hart won the caucus.

== Results ==
1984 United States presidential election in Vermont
Party	Candidate	Votes	Percentage	Electoral votes
Republican	Ronald Reagan (incumbent)	135,865	57.92%	3
Democratic/Progressive	Walter Mondale	95,730	40.81%	0
Libertarian	David Bergland	1,002	0.43%	0
No party	Write-ins	712	0.30%	0
Independent	Lyndon LaRouche	423	0.18%	0
Liberty Union (New Alliance)	Dennis L. Serrette	323	0.14%	0
Citizens	Sonia Johnson	264	0.11%	0
Socialist Workers	Melvin T. Mason	127	0.05%	0
Communist	Gus Hall	115	0.05%	0
Totals		234,561	100.00%	3
Voter Turnout (Voting age/Registered)				60%/70%

=== Results by county ===
County	Ronald Reagan Republican		Walter Mondale Democratic		David Bergland Libertarian		Various candidates Write-ins		Various candidates Other parties		Margin		Total
County	#	%	#	%	#	%	#	%	#	%	#	%	Total
Addison	7,589	58.26%	5,299	40.68%	46	0.35%	40	0.31%	51	0.39%	2,290	17.58%	13,025
Bennington	9,035	59.11%	6,039	39.51%	82	0.54%	16	0.10%	112	0.73%	2,996	19.60%	15,284
Caledonia	7,249	68.32%	3,223	30.38%	48	0.45%	37	0.35%	53	0.50%	4,026	37.94%	10,610
Chittenden	30,217	54.11%	24,830	44.46%	335	0.60%	206	0.37%	257	0.46%	5,387	9.65%	55,845
Essex	1,632	69.48%	693	29.50%	5	0.21%	4	0.17%	15	0.64%	939	39.98%	2,349
Franklin	8,683	59.63%	5,755	39.52%	45	0.31%	27	0.19%	52	0.36%	2,928	20.11%	14,562
Grand Isle	1,537	60.27%	980	38.43%	15	0.59%	3	0.12%	15	0.59%	557	21.84%	2,550
Lamoille	4,674	62.10%	2,746	36.49%	32	0.43%	24	0.32%	50	0.66%	1,928	25.61%	7,526
Orange	6,407	60.24%	4,088	38.44%	46	0.43%	47	0.44%	47	0.44%	2,319	21.80%	10,635
Orleans	5,966	63.53%	3,294	35.08%	40	0.43%	34	0.36%	57	0.61%	2,672	28.45%	9,391
Rutland	15,236	60.98%	9,545	38.20%	69	0.28%	35	0.14%	100	0.40%	5,691	22.78%	24,985
Washington	13,706	54.48%	11,163	44.37%	115	0.46%	59	0.23%	115	0.46%	2,543	10.11%	25,158
Windham	9,880	54.05%	8,206	44.89%	39	0.21%	60	0.33%	94	0.51%	1,674	9.16%	18,279
Windsor	14,054	57.96%	9,869	40.70%	85	0.35%	120	0.49%	119	0.49%	4,185	17.26%	24,247
Totals	135,865	57.92%	95,730	40.81%	1,002	0.43%	712	0.30%	1,252	0.53%	40,135	17.11%	234,561

==== Counties flipped from Democratic to Republican ====
- Chittenden
- Grand Isle

== See also ==
- United States presidential elections in Vermont

== Works cited ==
- Primary and General Elections. Secretary of State of Vermont. 1984.
