= 1996 United States presidential election in Vermont =

- November 5, 1996
- Turnout: 67.9% ▼8.47 pp

Nominee	Bill Clinton	Bob Dole	Ross Perot
Party	Democratic	Republican	Reform
Home state	Arkansas	Kansas	Texas
Running mate	Al Gore	Jack Kemp	Patrick Choate
Electoral vote	3	0	0
Popular vote	137,894	80,352	31,024
Percentage	53.35%	31.09%	12.00%

Clinton
30–40%
40–50%
50–60%
60–70%
Dole
40–50%
50–60%
President before election
Bill Clinton
Democratic
Elected President
Bill Clinton
Democratic

The 1996 United States presidential election in Vermont took place on November 7, 1996, as part of the 1996 United States presidential election. Voters chose three representatives, or electors to the Electoral College, who voted for president and vice president.

Vermont was won by incumbent Democratic President Bill Clinton over Republican Senator Bob Dole of Kansas, with Clinton winning 53.35% to Dole's 31.09%, a margin of 22.26%. The Reform Party candidate, businessman Ross Perot, finished in third, with 12.00% of the popular vote. Clinton won almost every municipality in the state.

Although Clinton had carried the state comfortably in 1992, prior to that point Vermont had been one of the most reliably Republican states in the nation, voting Republican in every election from 1856 to 1988 except for the 1964 nationwide Democratic landslide. However Vermont had always favored a liberal, secular, Northeastern brand of Republicanism, and by the 1990s, the Republican Party had become increasingly dominated by conservative, Southern, and Evangelical Christian interests. Consequently, Vermont trended increasingly toward the Democratic Party, and Clinton was able to win an even bigger victory in the state in 1996 than he had in 1992, again sweeping every county in the state.

Clinton's win in 1996 marked the first time in history that Vermont had voted Democratic in two consecutive presidential elections, signifying a long-term realignment of the state away from the GOP. It was also the first time since 1964 that a Democratic candidate won a majority of the popular vote (Clinton won the state four years prior, but with only a plurality of 46.11%). Since then Vermont has become regarded as one of the safest of blue states; it has remained Democratic in every election that has followed, often by landslide margins.

This is the last time that the town of Morgan voted Democratic in a presidential election until 2008.

== Results ==
1996 United States presidential election in Vermont
Party	Candidate	Running mate	Votes	Percentage	Electoral votes
Democratic	Bill Clinton (incumbent)	Al Gore (incumbent)	137,894	53.35%	3
Republican	Robert Dole	Jack Kemp	80,352	31.09%	0
Reform	Ross Perot	Patrick Choate	31,024	12.00%	0
Green Coalition	Ralph Nader	Anne Goeke (Note: Vermont is one of the states where Ralph Nader's running mate (Winona LaDuke) was replaced on the ballot by Anne Goeke.)	5,585	2.16%	0
Libertarian	Harry Browne	Jo Jorgensen	1,183	0.46%	0
No party	Write-in		560	0.22%	0
Natural Law	Dr. John Hagelin	Dr. V. Tompkins	498	0.19%	0
Grassroots	Dennis Peron	Arlin Troutt Jr.	480	0.19%	0
U.S. Taxpayers' Party	Howard Phillips	Albion W. Knight Jr.	382	0.15%	0
Liberty Union	Mary Cal Hollis	Eric Chester	292	0.11%	0
Socialist Workers Party	James Harris	Laura Garza	199	0.08%	0

=== Results by county ===
County	Bill Clinton Democratic		Bob Dole Republican		Ross Perot Reform		Ralph Nader Green		Various candidates Other parties		Margin		Total votes cast
County	#	%	#	%	#	%	#	%	#	%	#	%	Total votes cast
Addison	8,164	52.83%	4,798	31.05%	1,808	11.70%	402	2.60%	281	1.82%	3,366	21.78%	15,453
Bennington	8,139	50.39%	5,229	32.37%	2,278	14.10%	357	2.21%	149	0.92%	2,910	18.02%	16,152
Caledonia	5,593	47.40%	4,089	34.66%	1,782	15.10%	201	1.70%	134	1.14%	1,504	12.74%	11,799
Chittenden	36,299	56.84%	19,020	29.78%	6,180	9.68%	1,395	2.18%	966	1.51%	17,279	27.06%	63,860
Essex	1,120	45.73%	819	33.44%	442	18.05%	25	1.02%	43	1.76%	301	12.29%	2,449
Franklin	8,790	54.24%	4,617	28.49%	2,488	15.35%	147	0.91%	164	1.01%	4,173	25.75%	16,206
Grand Isle	1,555	51.13%	958	31.50%	441	14.50%	45	1.48%	42	1.38%	597	19.63%	3,041
Lamoille	4,997	54.40%	2,705	29.45%	1,216	13.24%	146	1.59%	122	1.33%	2,292	24.95%	9,186
Orange	6,107	49.79%	4,043	32.96%	1,597	13.02%	279	2.27%	240	1.96%	2,064	16.83%	12,266
Orleans	5,137	51.44%	3,114	31.18%	1,508	15.10%	130	1.30%	97	0.97%	2,023	20.26%	9,986
Rutland	13,230	48.59%	9,934	36.48%	3,408	12.52%	320	1.18%	337	1.24%	3,296	12.11%	27,229
Washington	14,267	55.12%	7,750	29.94%	2,788	10.77%	739	2.86%	340	1.31%	6,517	25.18%	25,884
Windham	10,426	55.12%	5,261	27.81%	2,033	10.75%	887	4.69%	308	1.63%	5,165	27.31%	18,915
Windsor	14,070	54.07%	8,015	30.80%	3,055	11.74%	512	1.97%	371	1.43%	6,055	23.27%	26,023
Totals	137,894	53.35%	80,352	31.09%	31,024	12.00%	5,585	2.16%	3,594	1.39%	57,542	22.26%	258,449

=== By congressional district ===
Due to the state's low population, only one congressional district is allocated. This district, called the at-large district because it covers the entire state, is thus equivalent to the statewide election results.

District	Clinton	Dole	Representative
At-large	53.35%	31.09%	Bernie Sanders

== See also ==
- United States presidential elections in Vermont
