= 1972 United States presidential election in Vermont =

- November 7, 1972

Nominee	Richard Nixon	George McGovern
Party	Republican	Democratic
Home state	California	South Dakota
Running mate	Spiro Agnew	Sargent Shriver
Electoral vote	3	0
Popular vote	117,149	68,174
Percentage	62.66%	36.47%

Nixon
40–50%
50–60%
60–70%
70–80%
80–90%
90–100%
McGovern
40–50%
50–60%
60–70%
President before election
Richard Nixon
Republican
Elected President
Richard Nixon
Republican

The 1972 United States presidential election in Vermont took place on November 7, 1972, as part of the 1972 United States presidential election which was held throughout all 50 states and the District of Columbia. Voters chose three representatives, or electors to the Electoral College, who voted for president and vice president.

Vermont voted for incumbent Republican President Richard Nixon of California and his running mate, Vice President Spiro Agnew of Maryland, defeating Democratic Senator George McGovern of South Dakota and his running mate U.S. Ambassador Sargent Shriver of Maryland.

Nixon took 62.66% of the vote to McGovern's 36.47%, a margin of 26.20%. Coming in a distant third was the People's Party candidate famed pediatrician Dr. Benjamin Spock, who took 0.54% in Vermont on the Liberty Union ballot line.

Vermont historically was a bastion of Northeastern Republicanism, and by 1972 Vermont had gone Republican in every presidential election since the founding of the Republican Party, except in the Democratic landslide of 1964, when the GOP had nominated staunch New Right conservative Senator Barry Goldwater of Arizona.

Richard Nixon was seen as a mainstream moderate Republican, and while winning nationally in a massive 49-state landslide, he easily held onto Vermont's three electoral votes. The only state McGovern carried was neighboring Massachusetts, along with the District of Columbia.

As Nixon won a historic landslide nationally, Vermont weighed in as about 3% more Republican than the nation.

Nixon won every county in Vermont, and broke 60% in every county except for Chittenden County, the most populous county, home to the state's largest city, Burlington whose precinct voted for McGovern. Though the state wouldn't vote for another Democratic presidential candidate until 1992, no subsequent Republican who won the state was able to match Nixon's 62% vote share. Nixon's 70.16% in Lamoille County is also the last time that a Republican has won over 70% of the vote in a Vermont county.

Richard Nixon had previously won Vermont against John F. Kennedy in 1960 and then again against Hubert Humphrey in 1968.

To date, this is the last time that the towns of Fairfield, Marshfield, Middlesex, Strafford, and Westminster voted Republican.

== Results ==
1972 United States presidential election in Vermont
Party	Candidate	Votes	Percentage	Electoral votes
Republican	Richard Nixon (incumbent)	117,149	62.66%	3
Democratic	George McGovern	68,174	36.47%	0
Liberty Union (People's)	Benjamin Spock	1,010	0.54%	0
No party	Write-ins	318	0.17%	0
Socialist Workers	Linda Jenness	296	0.16%	0
Totals		186,947	100.00%	3
Voter Turnout (Voting age/Registered)				61%/68%

=== Results by county ===
County	Richard Nixon Republican		George McGovern Democratic		Benjamin Spock Liberty Union		Various candidates Other parties		Linda Jenness Socialist Workers		Margin		Total votes cast
County	#	%	#	%	#	%	#	%	#	%	#	%	Total votes cast
Addison	6,467	65.99%	3,262	33.29%	48	0.49%	14	0.14%	9	0.09%	3,205	32.70%	9,800
Bennington	7,542	60.56%	4,804	38.58%	67	0.54%	16	0.13%	25	0.20%	2,738	21.98%	12,453
Caledonia	6,762	68.04%	3,094	31.13%	33	0.33%	37	0.37%	13	0.13%	3,668	36.91%	9,939
Chittenden	23,063	58.09%	16,163	40.71%	313	0.79%	65	0.16%	100	0.25%	6,900	17.38%	39,703
Essex	1,441	68.29%	655	31.04%	10	0.47%	4	0.19%	0	0.00%	786	37.25%	2,110
Franklin	8,109	67.21%	3,898	32.31%	37	0.31%	2	0.02%	19	0.16%	4,211	34.90%	12,065
Grand Isle	1,259	62.39%	743	36.82%	12	0.59%	4	0.20%	0	0.00%	516	25.57%	2,018
Lamoille	4,164	70.16%	1,659	27.95%	29	0.49%	80	1.35%	3	0.05%	2,505	42.21%	5,935
Orange	5,389	69.12%	2,332	29.91%	51	0.65%	14	0.18%	11	0.14%	3,057	39.21%	7,797
Orleans	4,906	63.21%	2,793	35.98%	29	0.37%	22	0.28%	12	0.15%	2,113	27.23%	7,762
Rutland	14,143	62.68%	8,261	36.61%	127	0.56%	15	0.07%	17	0.08%	5,882	26.07%	22,563
Washington	12,421	61.58%	7,596	37.66%	96	0.48%	15	0.07%	41	0.20%	4,825	23.92%	20,169
Windham	9,063	60.02%	5,925	39.24%	79	0.52%	13	0.09%	21	0.14%	3,137	20.78%	15,101
Windsor	12,421	63.59%	6,989	35.78%	79	0.40%	25	0.13%	18	0.09%	5,432	27.81%	19,532
Totals	117,149	62.66%	68,174	36.47%	1,010	0.54%	317	0.16%	296	0.16%	48,975	26.19%	186,946

==== Counties that flipped from Democratic to Republican ====
- Chittenden
- Franklin

== See also ==
- United States presidential elections in Vermont
