= 1960 United States presidential election in Vermont =

- November 8, 1960

Nominee	Richard Nixon	John F. Kennedy
Party	Republican	Democratic
Home state	California	Massachusetts
Running mate	Henry Cabot Lodge Jr.	Lyndon B. Johnson
Electoral vote	3	0
Popular vote	98,131	69,186
Percentage	58.65%	41.35%

Nixon
50–60%
60–70%
70–80%
80–90%
90–100%
Kennedy
50–60%
60–70%
70–80%
80–90%
President before election
Dwight D. Eisenhower
Republican
Elected President
John F. Kennedy
Democratic

The 1960 United States presidential election in Vermont took place on November 8, 1960, as part of the 1960 United States presidential election which was held throughout all 50 states. Voters chose three representatives, or electors to the Electoral College, who voted for president and vice president.

Vermont was won by the Republican nominee, incumbent Vice President Richard Nixon of California, and his running mate former Ambassador Henry Cabot Lodge Jr. of Massachusetts, defeating Democratic Senator John F. Kennedy of Massachusetts and his running mate Senate Majority Leader Lyndon B. Johnson of Texas.

Nixon took 58.65% of the vote to Kennedy's 41.35%, a margin of 17.30%.

Vermont historically was a bastion of Northeastern Republicanism, and by 1960 it had gone Republican in every presidential election since the founding of the Republican Party. From 1856 to 1956, Vermont had had the longest streak of voting Republican of any state, having never voted Democratic before, and this tradition continued in 1960. This election would prove to be the conclusion of a 104-year winning streak, as Vermont would flip to the Democrats for the first time four years later in 1964.

As Kennedy won a razor-thin victory over Nixon nationally, Vermont weighed in as about seventeen percent more Republican than the national average, and his 58.65% of the popular vote made Vermont the fourth most Republican state in the nation in the 1960 election after Nebraska, Kansas and Oklahoma.

Kennedy, an Irish Catholic Democrat from neighboring Massachusetts, did however improve dramatically on the performance of Democrat Adlai Stevenson in Vermont in 1952 and 1956. In both of those years Stevenson had taken less than 30% of the vote against Republican Dwight Eisenhower, who had received more than 70% of the vote in Vermont and had swept every county in the state.

Nixon won 11 of the 14 counties in Vermont, losing 3 counties in the northwestern part of the state. The three northwestern counties of Vermont (Chittenden, Franklin and Grand Isle) had long been Democratic enclaves in an otherwise Republican state through the 1930s and 1940s, but had gone Republican in the 1950s for Eisenhower. Only the second Roman Catholic to be nominated for president by a major party, Kennedy's appeal to Catholics and ethnic working class voters brought northwestern Vermont back into the Democratic column in 1960. Kennedy won Chittenden County, the most populous county, home to the state's largest city, Burlington. Chittenden County had been the only county in Vermont to flip to the Democrats for the first Roman Catholic nominee Al Smith in 1928. Kennedy also won Franklin and Grand Isle Counties, which had joined Chittenden in voting Democratic for Franklin Roosevelt in 1932, even as the rest of the state remained reliably Republican. Thus the split between the northwest and the rest of the state was a familiar result typical of New Deal coalition era elections in Vermont.

Richard Nixon would later win Vermont again against Hubert Humphrey in 1968 and then again against George McGovern in 1972.

== Results ==
1960 United States presidential election in Vermont
Party	Candidate	Votes	Percentage	Electoral votes
Republican	Richard Nixon	98,131	58.65%	3
Democratic	John F. Kennedy	69,186	41.35%	0
No party	Write-ins	7	0.00%	0
Totals		167,324	100.00%	3
Voter Turnout (Voting age/Registered)				72%/81%

=== Results by county ===
County	Richard Nixon Republican		John F. Kennedy Democratic		Various candidates Write-ins		Margin		Total votes cast
County	#	%	#	%	#	%	#	%	Total votes cast
Addison	5,520	65.03%	2,969	34.97%			2,551	30.06%	8,489
Bennington	7,099	61.19%	4,502	38.80%	1	0.01%	2,597	22.39%	11,602
Caledonia	6,688	69.69%	2,909	30.31%			3,779	39.38%	9,597
Chittenden	13,072	43.53%	16,959	56.47%			-3,887	-12.94%	30,031
Essex	1,439	57.51%	1,063	42.49%			376	15.02%	2,502
Franklin	5,444	43.65%	7,028	56.35%			-1,584	-12.70%	12,472
Grand Isle	798	49.35%	819	50.65%			-21	-1.30%	1,617
Lamoille	3,272	76.02%	1,032	23.98%			2,240	52.04%	4,304
Orange	5,363	77.23%	1,581	22.77%			3,782	54.46%	6,944
Orleans	5,027	59.98%	3,354	40.02%			1,673	19.96%	8,381
Rutland	12,166	56.82%	9,246	43.18%			2,920	13.64%	21,412
Washington	10,458	59.49%	7,116	40.48%	4	0.02%	3,342	19.01%	17,578
Windham	9,128	67.69%	4,358	32.31%			4,770	35.38%	13,486
Windsor	12,657	66.94%	6,250	33.05%	2	0.01%	6,407	33.89%	18,909
Totals	98,131	58.65%	69,186	41.35%	7	0.00%	28,945	17.30%	167,324

==== Counties flipped from Republican to Democratic ====
- Chittenden
- Franklin
- Grand Isle

== See also ==
- United States presidential elections in Vermont
