= 1968 United States presidential election in Vermont =

- November 5, 1968
- Turnout: 64% (voting age)

Nominee	Richard Nixon	Hubert Humphrey
Party	Republican	Democratic
Home state	New York (Note: Although he was born in California and he served as a U.S. senator from California, in 1968 Richard Nixon’s official state of residence was New York, because he moved there to practice law after his defeat in the 1962 California gubernatorial election. During his first term as president, Nixon re-established his residency in California. Consequently, most reliable reference books list Nixon's home state as New York in the 1968 election and his home state as California in the 1972 (and 1960) election.)	Minnesota
Running mate	Spiro Agnew	Edmund Muskie
Electoral vote	3	0
Popular vote	85,142	70,255
Percentage	52.75%	43.53%

Nixon
40–50%
50–60%
60–70%
70–80%
80–90%
90–100%
Humphrey
30–40%
40–50%
50–60%
60–70%
70–80%
President before election
Lyndon Johnson
Democratic
Elected President
Richard Nixon
Republican

The 1968 United States presidential election in Vermont took place on November 5, 1968, as part of the 1968 United States presidential election which was held throughout all 50 states and the District of Columbia. Voters chose three representatives, or electors to the Electoral College, who voted for president and vice president.

Vermont was won by the Republican nominee, former Vice President Richard Nixon of California, and his running mate Governor Spiro Agnew of Maryland, defeating incumbent Democratic Vice President Hubert H. Humphrey of Minnesota and his running mate Senator Edmund Muskie of Maine.

Nixon took 52.75% of the vote to Humphrey’s 43.53%, a margin of 9.22%. The American Independent candidate, Southern populist Governor George Wallace of Alabama, did not have a serious impact on the race. While taking 13.53% nationally and winning electoral votes from 5 Southern states, Wallace would take only 3.16% of the vote in Vermont. Wallace's base of support was in the South, and he had practically no appeal in liberal Northeastern states like Vermont, which would be Wallace’s third weakest state in the nation after Hawaii and Maine.

Vermont historically was a bastion of Northeastern Republicanism, and by 1968 Vermont had gone Republican in every presidential election since the founding of the Republican Party, except in the Democratic landslide of 1964, when the GOP had nominated staunch New Right conservative Senator Barry Goldwater of Arizona. Goldwater had lost the 1964 election in a nationwide landslide, but the loss in Vermont was especially severe from a historical perspective. From 1856 to 1960, Vermont had the longest streak of voting Republican of any state, having never voted Democratic before, but in 1964 it rejected Goldwater's conservatism and went Democratic for the first time – and by a landslide 66-33 margin.

In 1968, the GOP sought to recover from their crippling defeat with Goldwater, and the party looked to former Vice President and the party’s narrowly defeated 1960 presidential nominee, Richard Nixon. Nixon was seen as a mainstream moderate Republican who could unite the competing factions of the Republican Party, and win back the moderate voters that Goldwater had alienated. The party recovered successfully and won back the White House, Vermont was returned to the Republican column, and Nixon’s 1968 victory in Vermont established another twenty-year winning streak for the GOP in the state. The state would finally flip to the Democrats for good in 1992 after the GOP again embraced a more conservative stance in the 1980s.

To date, this is the last time that the towns Calais, Marlboro, Plainfield, and Putney voted Republican.

== Results ==
1968 United States presidential election in Vermont
Party	Candidate	Votes	Percentage	Electoral votes
Republican	Richard Nixon	85,142	52.75%	3
Democratic	Hubert H. Humphrey	70,255	43.53%	0
American Independent	George Wallace	5,104	3.16%	0
New Party	Eugene McCarthy	579	0.36%	0
Socialist Workers	Fred Halstead	295	0.18%	0
No party	Write-ins	29	0.02%	0
Totals		161,404	100.00%	3
Voter Turnout (Voting age/Registered)				64%/73%

=== Results by county ===
County	Richard Nixon Republican		Hubert Humphrey Democratic		George Wallace American Independent		Various candidates Other parties		Margin		Total votes cast
County	#	%	#	%	#	%	#	%	#	%	Total votes cast
Addison	5,006	60.84%	2,914	35.42%	278	3.38%	30	0.36%	2,092	25.42%	8,228
Bennington	5,967	52.27%	4,966	43.50%	401	3.51%	82	0.72%	1,001	8.77%	11,416
Caledonia	4,996	58.88%	3,201	37.73%	250	2.95%	38	0.45%	1,795	21.15%	8,485
Chittenden	14,621	45.34%	16,420	50.91%	1,000	3.10%	209	0.65%	-1,799	-5.57%	32,250
Essex	1,009	49.83%	952	47.01%	57	2.81%	7	0.35%	57	2.82%	2,025
Franklin	5,218	44.67%	6,027	51.60%	398	3.41%	38	0.33%	-809	-6.93%	11,681
Grand Isle	754	48.36%	730	46.82%	73	4.68%	2	0.13%	24	1.54%	1,559
Lamoille	2,965	68.04%	1,239	28.43%	140	3.21%	14	0.32%	1,726	39.61%	4,358
Orange	4,135	66.16%	1,879	30.06%	200	3.20%	36	0.58%	2,256	36.10%	6,250
Orleans	4,055	56.97%	2,762	38.80%	269	3.78%	32	0.45%	1,293	18.17%	7,118
Rutland	10,318	51.26%	9,000	44.72%	699	3.47%	110	0.55%	1,318	6.54%	20,127
Washington	9,387	52.62%	7,826	43.87%	497	2.79%	129	0.72%	1,561	8.75%	17,839
Windham	6,916	54.37%	5,353	42.08%	374	2.94%	78	0.61%	1,563	12.29%	12,721
Windsor	9,795	56.47%	6,986	40.27%	468	2.70%	98	0.56%	2,809	16.20%	17,347
Totals	85,142	52.75%	70,255	43.53%	5,104	3.16%	903	0.56%	14,887	9.22%	161,404

==== Counties that flipped from Democratic to Republican ====
- Addison
- Bennington
- Caledonia
- Essex
- Grand Isle
- Lamoille
- Orange
- Orleans
- Rutland
- Washington
- Windham
- Windsor

== Analysis ==
As Nixon won a razor-thin victory over Humphrey nationally, Vermont weighed in as about 8% more Republican than the nation. However, with the four other New England states voting for Humphrey, Vermont became one of the two states in the region (the other being neighboring New Hampshire) to vote for Nixon. As of 2020, this is the last election in which Vermont voted more Republican than New Hampshire. This is the second and final time since 1852 that Vermont voted for a different candidate than Maine.

Nixon won 12 of the 14 counties in Vermont, losing only 2 counties in the northwestern part of the state. Humphrey won Chittenden County, the most populous county, home to the state's largest city, Burlington, as well as Franklin County. The northwestern 3 counties of Vermont had long been Democratic enclaves in an otherwise Republican state, although in 1968 Nixon was able to win a plurality in tiny Grand Isle County. Nixon became the first Republican to ever win without Franklin County.

Richard Nixon had previously won Vermont again against John F. Kennedy in 1960 and then would win it again against George McGovern in 1972.

== See also ==
- United States presidential elections in Vermont
