= 2008 United States presidential election in Vermont =

- November 4, 2008

Nominee	Barack Obama	John McCain
Party	Democratic	Republican
Home state	Illinois	Arizona
Running mate	Joe Biden	Sarah Palin
Electoral vote	3	0
Popular vote	219,262	98,974
Percentage	67.46%	30.45%

Obama
40–50%
50–60%
60–70%
70–80%
80–90%
McCain
50–60%
60–70%
President before election
George W. Bush
Republican
Elected President
Barack Obama
Democratic

The 2008 United States presidential election in Vermont took place on November 4, 2008, concurrent with the federal election in all 50 states and D.C., which was part of the 2008 United States presidential election. Voters chose three representatives, or electors to the Electoral College, who voted for president and vice president.

Vermont was won by Democratic nominee Barack Obama with 67.46%, to Republican John McCain's 30.45%, a Democratic victory margin of 37.01%.

Obama carried every county by more than 60% of the vote with the exception of Essex County, which he won with 56%. He also broke 70% in 3 counties. A very liberal Northeastern state, Vermont was the second most Democratic state in the nation, weighing in as a whopping 30% more Democratic than the national average in the 2008 election. Obama's landslide win in Vermont outperformed Lyndon Johnson's 1964 Democratic landslide in the state, making the results of 2008 the strongest Democratic victory in Vermont's history.

Vermont was one of three states, along with Obama's home state of Illinois and Biden's home state of Delaware, where his 2008 presidential performance outperformed both Franklin Delano Roosevelt in all four of his runs and Lyndon Johnson in his landslide 1964 victory.

To date, this is the last time that the towns of Maidstone and Morgan voted Democratic and the last time that the town of Stratton voted Republican.

== Primaries ==
- 2008 Vermont Democratic presidential primary
- 2008 Vermont Republican presidential primary

=== Liberty Union primary ===
A primary was held for the Liberty Union Party for the first time since 1996. The party nominated Socialist Party USA nominee Brian Moore, who was favored by party leadership and was the only candidate to gather the 1,000 signatures required to appear on the ballot.

2008 Liberty Union presidential primary, March 4, 2008
Candidate	Votes	Percentage
Brian Moore (Socialist)	178	44.61%
Other write-ins (Note: Not all communities identified the recipients of write-in votes, so some of these may have been additional votes for the recipients listed below.)	170	42.61%
Barack Obama (write-in) (Democratic)	25	6.27%
Hillary Clinton (write-in) (Democratic)	15	3.67%
Ralph Nader (write-in) (Independent)	5	1.25%
Eugene Debs† (write-in) (Socialist)	1	0.25%
Patrick Leahy (write-in) (Democratic)	1	0.25%
John McCain (write-in) (Republican)	1	0.25%
Richard Norford (write-in)	1	0.25%
Ron Paul (write-in) (Republican)	1	0.25%
Morgan Phillips (write-in)	1	0.25%
Totals	399	100.00%

== Campaign ==
=== Predictions ===
There were 16 news organizations who made state-by-state predictions of the election. Here are their last predictions before election day:

Source	Ranking
D.C. Political Report	Likely D
Cook Political Report	Solid D
The Takeaway	Solid D
Electoral-vote.com	Solid D
Washington Post	Solid D
Politico	Solid D
RealClearPolitics	Solid D
FiveThirtyEight	Solid D
CQ Politics	Solid D
The New York Times	Solid D
CNN	Safe D
NPR	Solid D
MSNBC	Solid D
Fox News	Likely D
Associated Press	Likely D
Rasmussen Reports	Safe D

=== Polling ===
Obama won every single pre-election poll, and each with a double-digit margin of victory. The final 3 polls averaged Obama leading 59% to 35%.

=== Fundraising ===
Obama raised a total of $2,071,271 in the state. McCain raised $206,395.

=== Advertising and visits ===
Neither campaign spent any money on advertising in Vermont. Neither campaign visited the state.

== Analysis ==
Vermont was once the quintessential Yankee Republican state. It identified with the newly formed GOP in 1856 and remained in the Republican fold for over 130 years. From 1856 to 1988, it only voted for a Democrat once, in Lyndon Johnson's 44-state landslide of 1964. Vermont and Maine were the only states that Franklin D. Roosevelt didn't carry in any of his four elections.

However, the brand of Republicanism practiced in Vermont has historically been a moderate one. Coupled with an influx of more liberal newcomers from out of state, this made Vermont considerably friendlier to Democrats as the national GOP moved further to the right. After narrowly supporting George H. W. Bush in 1988, Vermont gave Bill Clinton a 16-point margin in 1992. Republicans have not seriously contested the state since then, and Vermont is now reckoned as part of a bloc of solidly blue states spanning most of the Northeast.

The 2008 race kept this tradition going. Obama won with 67% of the vote to McCain's 30%. The state was called for Obama almost as soon as the polls closed, and was the first state called for Obama. Obama was the first Democrat to get over 70% of the vote in any Vermont county since 1964, and the first for either party since 1972.

Vermont was Obama's second-best state and his best in the contiguous 48 states; only topped by the staggering 71% he received in Hawaii, the state where he was born. The Obama-Biden ticket won every county in the state, including several northeastern counties which had a history of voting Republican. Obama also performed better than John Kerry in every county. As a measure of how Republican Vermont once was, George W. Bush was at the time the only Republican to win the White House without carrying Vermont.

== Results ==
2008 United States presidential election in Vermont
Party	Candidate	Running mate	Votes	Percentage	Electoral votes
Democratic	Barack Obama	Joe Biden	219,262	67.46%	3
Republican	John McCain	Sarah Palin	98,974	30.45%	0
Independent	Ralph Nader	Matt Gonzalez	3,339	1.03%	0
Libertarian	Bob Barr	Wayne Allyn Root	1,067	0.33%	0
Constitution	Chuck Baldwin	Darrell Castle	500	0.15%	0
Others*	Others		1,904	0.59%	0
Totals			325,046	100.00%	3
Voter turnout (Voting age population)					66.7%

- Others include Cynthia McKinney, Green; Róger Calero, Socialist Workers; Gloria La Riva, Socialism and Liberation; and Brian Moore, Liberty Union.

=== By county ===

County	Barack Obama Democratic		John McCain Republican		Various candidates Other parties		Margin		Total votes cast
County	#	%	#	%	#	%	#	%	Total votes cast
Addison	13,202	68.62%	5,667	29.46%	369	1.92%	7,535	39.16%	19,238
Bennington	12,524	65.47%	6,133	32.06%	472	2.47%	6,391	33.41%	19,129
Caledonia	8,900	60.43%	5,472	37.15%	356	2.42%	3,428	23.28%	14,728
Chittenden	59,611	71.44%	22,237	26.65%	1,592	1.91%	37,374	44.79%	83,440
Essex	1,733	55.89%	1,284	41.41%	84	2.70%	449	14.48%	3,101
Franklin	13,179	61.41%	7,853	36.59%	428	2.00%	5,326	24.82%	21,460
Grand Isle	2,694	63.11%	1,490	34.90%	85	1.99%	1,204	28.21%	4,269
Lamoille	8,914	70.37%	3,515	27.75%	239	1.88%	5,399	42.62%	12,668
Orange	9,799	64.56%	5,047	33.25%	333	2.19%	4,752	31.31%	15,179
Orleans	7,998	62.63%	4,482	35.10%	291	2.27%	3,516	27.53%	12,771
Rutland	19,355	61.22%	11,584	36.64%	678	2.14%	7,771	24.58%	31,617
Washington	22,324	69.33%	9,129	28.35%	747	2.32%	13,195	40.98%	32,200
Windham	17,585	73.02%	5,997	24.90%	499	2.08%	11,588	48.12%	24,081
Windsor	21,444	68.81%	9,084	29.15%	637	2.04%	12,360	39.66%	31,165
Totals	219,262	67.46%	98,974	30.45%	6,810	2.09%	120,288	37.01%	325,046

==== Counties that flipped from Republican to Democratic ====
- Essex (largest town: Lunenburg)

=== By congressional district ===
Due to the state's low population, only one congressional district is allocated. This district, called the at-large district because it covers the entire state, is thus equivalent to the statewide election results.

District	McCain	Obama	Representative
At-large	30.45%	67.46%	Peter Welch

== Electors ==
Technically the voters of Vermont, as they do in every state, cast their ballots for electors: representatives to the Electoral College. Vermont is allocated three electors because it has 1 congressional district and 2 senators. All candidates who appear on the ballot or qualify to receive write-in votes must submit a list of 3 electors, who pledge to vote for their candidate and their running mate. Whoever wins the majority of votes in the state is awarded all 3 electoral votes. Their chosen electors then vote for president and vice president. Although electors are pledged to their candidate and running mate, they are not obligated to vote for them. An elector who votes for someone other than their candidate is known as a faithless elector.

The electors of each state and the District of Columbia met on December 15, 2008, to cast their votes for president and vice president. The Electoral College itself never meets as one body. Instead the electors from each state and the District of Columbia met in their respective capitols.

The following were elected at large as members of the Electoral College from the state. All three were pledged to Barack Obama and Joe Biden:

1. Claire Ayer
2. Euan Bear
3. Kevin Christie

== See also ==
- United States presidential elections in Vermont
