= Windsor County, Vermont =

County in Vermont, United States

- County
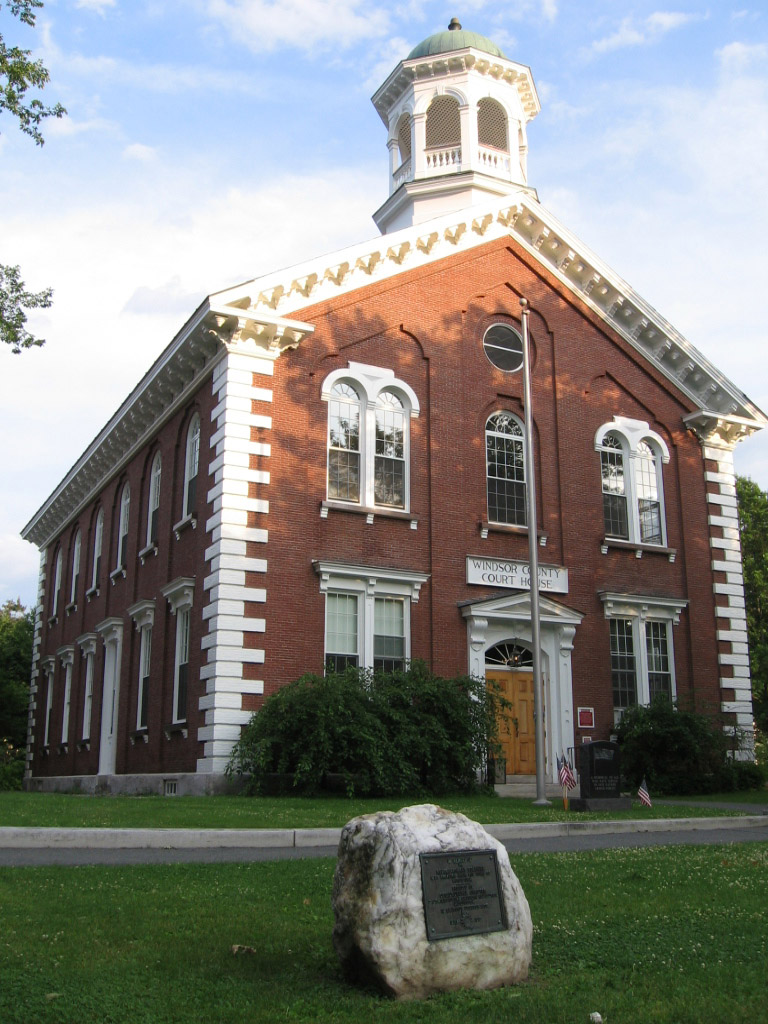
- Windsor County courthouse in Woodstock

- Location within the U.S. state of Vermont
- Coordinates: 43°33′30″N 72°31′59″W
- Country: United States
- State: Vermont
- Founded: 1781
- Named for: Windsor, Vermont, which was named for Windsor, Connecticut
- Shire Town: Woodstock
- Largest town: Hartford

Area
  - Total: 977 sq mi (2,530 km^{2})
  - Land: 969 sq mi (2,510 km^{2})
  - Water: 7.4 sq mi (19 km^{2}) 0.8%

Population (2020)
  - Total: 57,753
  - Estimate (2025): 57,312 ▼
  - Density: 59.6/sq mi (23.0/km^{2})
- Time zone: UTC−5 (Eastern)
  - Summer (DST): UTC−4 (EDT)
- Congressional district: At-large

Windsor County is a county located in the U.S. state of Vermont. As of the 2020 census, the population was 57,753. The shire town (county seat) is the town of Woodstock. The county's largest municipality is the town of Hartford.

== History ==
Windsor County is one of several Vermont counties created from land previously ceded by the Province of New York and abandoned by the newly formed State of New York, established on January 15, 1777, when Vermont declared itself to be an independent state (the Vermont Republic). The land originally was contested by Massachusetts, New Hampshire, and New Netherland, but it remained undelineated until July 20, 1764, when King George III established the boundary between the Province of New Hampshire and the Province of New York along the west bank of the Connecticut River, north of Massachusetts and south of the parallel of 45 degrees north latitude. New York assigned the land gained to Albany County. On March 12, 1772, Albany County was partitioned to create Charlotte County, and this situation remained until Vermont's independence from New York and Britain.

Windsor County was established on February 16, 1781, from parts of Cumberland County and organized the same year.

Windsor County is notable for being the birthplace and burial site of Calvin Coolidge, the 30th U.S. President and one of two Presidents born in the state (the other being Chester A. Arthur). Joseph Smith Jr., founder of the Latter Day Saint movement, was also born in Windsor County.

== Geography ==
According to the U.S. Census Bureau, the county has a total area of 977 square miles (2,530 km^{2}), of which 969 square miles (2,510 km^{2}) is land and 7.4 square miles (19 km^{2}) (0.8%) is water. It is the largest county by area in Vermont.

=== Adjacent counties ===
- Orange County - north
- Grafton County, New Hampshire - northeast
- Sullivan County, New Hampshire - east
- Windham County - south
- Bennington County - southwest
- Rutland County - west
- Addison County - northwest

=== National parks ===
- Green Mountain National Forest (part)
- Marsh-Billings-Rockefeller National Historical Park
- White Rocks National Recreation Area (part)

=== Major highways ===
- I-89
- I-91
- US 4
- US 5
- VT 10
- VT 11
- VT 12
- VT 14
- VT 35
- VT 44
- VT 73
- VT 100
- VT 100A
- VT 103
- VT 106
- VT 107
- VT 131
- VT 132
- VT 155

== Demographics ==
Historical population
Census	Pop.	Note	%±
1790	15,740		—
1800	26,944		71.2%
1810	34,877		29.4%
1820	38,233		9.6%
1830	40,625		6.3%
1840	40,356		−0.7%
1850	38,504		−4.6%
1860	37,193		−3.4%
1870	36,063		−3.0%
1880	35,196		−2.4%
1890	31,706		−9.9%
1900	32,225		1.6%
1910	33,681		4.5%
1920	36,984		9.8%
1930	37,416		1.2%
1940	37,862		1.2%
1950	40,885		8.0%
1960	42,483		3.9%
1970	44,082		3.8%
1980	51,030		15.8%
1990	54,055		5.9%
2000	57,418		6.2%
2010	56,670		−1.3%
2020	57,753		1.9%
2025 (est.)	57,312	▼	−0.8%
U.S. Decennial Census; 1790–1960 1900–1990; 1990–2000 2010–2018

=== 2020 census ===
As of the 2020 census, the county had a population of 57,753. Of the residents, 17.6% were under the age of 18 and 24.6% were 65 years of age or older; the median age was 48.5 years. For every 100 females there were 96.2 males, and for every 100 females age 18 and over there were 94.1 males.

The racial makeup of the county was 91.6% White, 0.8% Black or African American, 0.3% American Indian and Alaska Native, 0.9% Asian, 0.8% from some other race, and 5.6% from two or more races. Hispanic or Latino residents of any race comprised 2.1% of the population.

There were 25,859 households in the county, of which 22.8% had children under the age of 18 living with them and 26.5% had a female householder with no spouse or partner present. About 31.9% of all households were made up of individuals and 15.0% had someone living alone who was 65 years of age or older.

There were 34,625 housing units, of which 25.3% were vacant. Among occupied housing units, 72.0% were owner-occupied and 28.0% were renter-occupied. The homeowner vacancy rate was 1.8% and the rental vacancy rate was 6.9%.

Windsor County, Vermont – Racial and ethnic composition Note: the US Census treats Hispanic/Latino as an ethnic category. This table excludes Latinos from the racial categories and assigns them to a separate category. Hispanics/Latinos may be of any race.
Race / Ethnicity (NH = Non-Hispanic)	Pop 2000	Pop 2010	Pop 2020	% 2000	% 2010	% 2020
White alone (NH)	55,764	54,093	52,537	97.11%	95.45%	90.96%
Black or African American alone (NH)	180	311	451	0.31%	0.54%	0.78%
Native American or Alaska Native alone (NH)	123	141	144	0.21%	0.24%	0.24%
Asian alone (NH)	354	526	539	0.61%	0.92%	0.93%
Pacific Islander alone (NH)	13	12	16	0.02%	0.02%	0.02%
Other race alone (NH)	37	39	278	0.06%	0.06%	0.48%
Mixed race or Multiracial (NH)	479	852	2,558	0.83%	1.50%	4.42%
Hispanic or Latino (any race)	468	696	1,230	0.81%	1.22%	2.12%
Total	57,418	56,670	57,753	100.00%	100.00%	100.00%

=== 2010 census ===
As of the 2010 United States census, there were 56,670 people, 24,753 households, and 15,420 families living in the county. The population density was 58.5 inhabitants per square mile (22.6/km^{2}). There were 34,118 housing units at an average density of 35.2 units per square mile (13.6 units/km^{2}). The racial makeup of the county was 96.3% white, 0.9% Asian, 0.6% black or African American, 0.3% American Indian, 0.2% from other races, and 1.7% from two or more races. Those of Hispanic or Latino origin made up 1.2% of the population.

Of the 24,753 households, 25.9% had children under the age of 18 living with them, 49.1% were married couples living together, 9.0% had a female householder with no husband present, 37.7% were non-families, and 30.0% of all households were made up of individuals. The average household size was 2.25 and the average family size was 2.77. The median age was 45.8 years.

The median income for a household in the county was $50,893 and the median income for a family was $63,387. Males had a median income of $44,610 versus $34,150 for females. The per capita income for the county was $29,053. About 5.6% of families and 9.7% of the population were below the poverty line, including 12.5% of those under age 18 and 7.6% of those age 65 or over.

=== 2000 census ===
As of the 2000 census, there were 57,418 people, 24,162 households, and 15,729 families living in the county. The population density was 59 inhabitants per square mile (23/km^{2}). There were 31,621 housing units at an average density of 33 units per square mile (13 units/km^{2}). The racial makeup of the county was 97.72% White, 0.33% Black or African American, 0.23% Native American, 0.63% Asian, 0.03% Pacific Islander, 0.15% from other races, and 0.91% from two or more races. 0.82% of the population were Hispanic or Latino of any race. 20.1% were of English, 12.9% Irish, 10.9% American, 9.9% French, 7.7% German, 6.7% French Canadian and 5.5% Italian ancestry. 96.4% spoke English and 1.5% French as their first language.

There were 24,162 households, out of which 29.20% had children under the age of 18 living with them, 52.70% were married couples living together, 9.00% had a female householder with no husband present, and 34.90% were non-families. 28.10% of all households were made up of individuals, and 11.10% had someone living alone who was 65 years of age or older. The average household size was 2.35 and the average family size was 2.86. In the county, the population was spread out, with 23.30% under the age of 18, 5.90% from 18 to 24, 27.30% from 25 to 44, 27.60% from 45 to 64, and 15.80% who were 65 years of age or older. The median age was 41 years. For every 100 females, there were 94.80 males. For every 100 females age 18 and over, there were 92.10 males.

The median income for a household in the county was $40,688, and the median income for a family was $59,002. Males had a median income of $42,648 versus $25,696 for females. The per capita income for the county was $22,369. About 3.20% of families and 5.70% of the population were below the poverty line, including 7.50% of those under age 18 and 7.60% of those age 65 or over.

In 2007, the census department estimated that Windsor had the oldest average age in the state, 44.7. This compares with the actual census in 2000 of 41.3 years.

== Politics ==
Since Vermont began using the popular vote in presidential elections in 1828, Windsor County has voted for the statewide winner in every presidential election but 1912, when it voted for former President Theodore Roosevelt (the Progressive candidate) over the statewide winner, Republican nominee William Howard Taft. Mirroring the politics of the state as a whole, Windsor County was solidly Republican from its inception in the 1856 election until the 1980s, voting only for Democrat Lyndon B. Johnson in 1964 when he faced Barry Goldwater. It has supported the Democratic presidential candidate in every election since 1992. Windsor County has given the Democrats at least 55 percent of the vote in every election since 2004.

United States presidential election results for Windsor County, Vermont
Year	Republican		Democratic		Third party(ies)	
Year	No.	%	No.	%	No.	%
1880	6,122	77.29%	1,740	21.97%	59	0.74%
1884	5,110	74.23%	1,601	23.26%	173	2.51%
1888	5,163	75.48%	1,457	21.30%	220	3.22%
1892	4,753	76.79%	1,329	21.47%	108	1.74%
1896	6,128	88.02%	674	9.68%	160	2.30%
1900	5,227	84.25%	943	15.20%	34	0.55%
1904	4,830	83.74%	797	13.82%	141	2.44%
1908	4,683	81.61%	907	15.81%	148	2.58%
1912	2,409	37.48%	1,302	20.26%	2,716	42.26%
1916	4,236	64.54%	2,216	33.77%	111	1.69%
1920	8,400	82.56%	1,714	16.85%	61	0.60%
1924	10,223	88.43%	1,015	8.78%	322	2.79%
1928	10,739	79.46%	2,747	20.33%	29	0.21%
1932	9,353	67.16%	4,343	31.18%	231	1.66%
1936	9,489	64.90%	5,084	34.77%	49	0.34%
1940	9,109	62.34%	5,475	37.47%	28	0.19%
1944	9,930	66.12%	5,089	33.88%	0	0.00%
1948	9,626	70.95%	3,736	27.54%	206	1.52%
1952	13,941	78.46%	3,791	21.33%	37	0.21%
1956	14,157	78.73%	3,820	21.24%	5	0.03%
1960	12,657	66.94%	6,250	33.05%	2	0.01%
1964	5,859	32.51%	12,163	67.49%	1	0.01%
1968	9,795	56.47%	6,986	40.27%	566	3.26%
1972	12,421	63.59%	6,989	35.78%	122	0.62%
1976	11,001	55.80%	8,282	42.01%	433	2.20%
1980	10,470	45.71%	8,067	35.22%	4,366	19.06%
1984	14,054	57.96%	9,869	40.70%	324	1.34%
1988	12,584	50.48%	12,009	48.17%	337	1.35%
1992	9,035	30.95%	13,871	47.52%	6,286	21.53%
1996	8,015	30.80%	14,070	54.07%	3,938	15.13%
2000	11,713	40.19%	15,140	51.94%	2,294	7.87%
2004	11,491	37.35%	18,561	60.33%	715	2.32%
2008	9,084	29.15%	21,444	68.81%	637	2.04%
2012	8,598	29.96%	19,494	67.93%	607	2.12%
2016	8,605	28.75%	17,556	58.66%	3,767	12.59%
2020	9,971	28.95%	23,376	67.86%	1,099	3.19%
2024	10,458	30.50%	22,569	65.82%	1,262	3.68%

== Transportation ==
In 2009, the United States Department of Transportation measured 113.6 miles (182.8 km) of "major arteries", the highest in the state.

== Communities ==
=== Towns ===
- Andover
- Baltimore
- Barnard
- Bethel
- Bridgewater
- Cavendish
- Chester
- Hartford
- Hartland
- Ludlow
- Norwich
- Plymouth
- Pomfret
- Reading
- Rochester
- Royalton
- Sharon
- Springfield
- Stockbridge
- Weathersfield
- West Windsor
- Weston
- Windsor
- Woodstock (shire town)

=== Villages ===
Villages are census divisions, but have no separate corporate existence from the surrounding towns.

- Ludlow
- Perkinsville
- Woodstock

=== Census-designated places ===
- Ascutney
- Bethel
- Cavendish
- Chester
- Hartland
- North Hartland
- North Springfield
- Norwich
- Proctorsville
- Quechee
- Rochester
- South Royalton
- South Woodstock
- Springfield
- West Woodstock
- Weston
- White River Junction
- Wilder
- Windsor

=== Unincorporated communities ===
- Brownsville
- Felchville
- Gaysville
- Hartford Village
- Hartland Four Corners
- Lewiston
- North Pomfret
- Plymouth Notch
- Weathersfield Bow
- West Hartford

== See also ==
- List of counties in Vermont
- List of towns in Vermont
- National Register of Historic Places listings in Windsor County, Vermont
- USS Windsor (APA-55), an attack transport named for Windsor County
