= Franklin County, Vermont =

County in Vermont, United States

- County
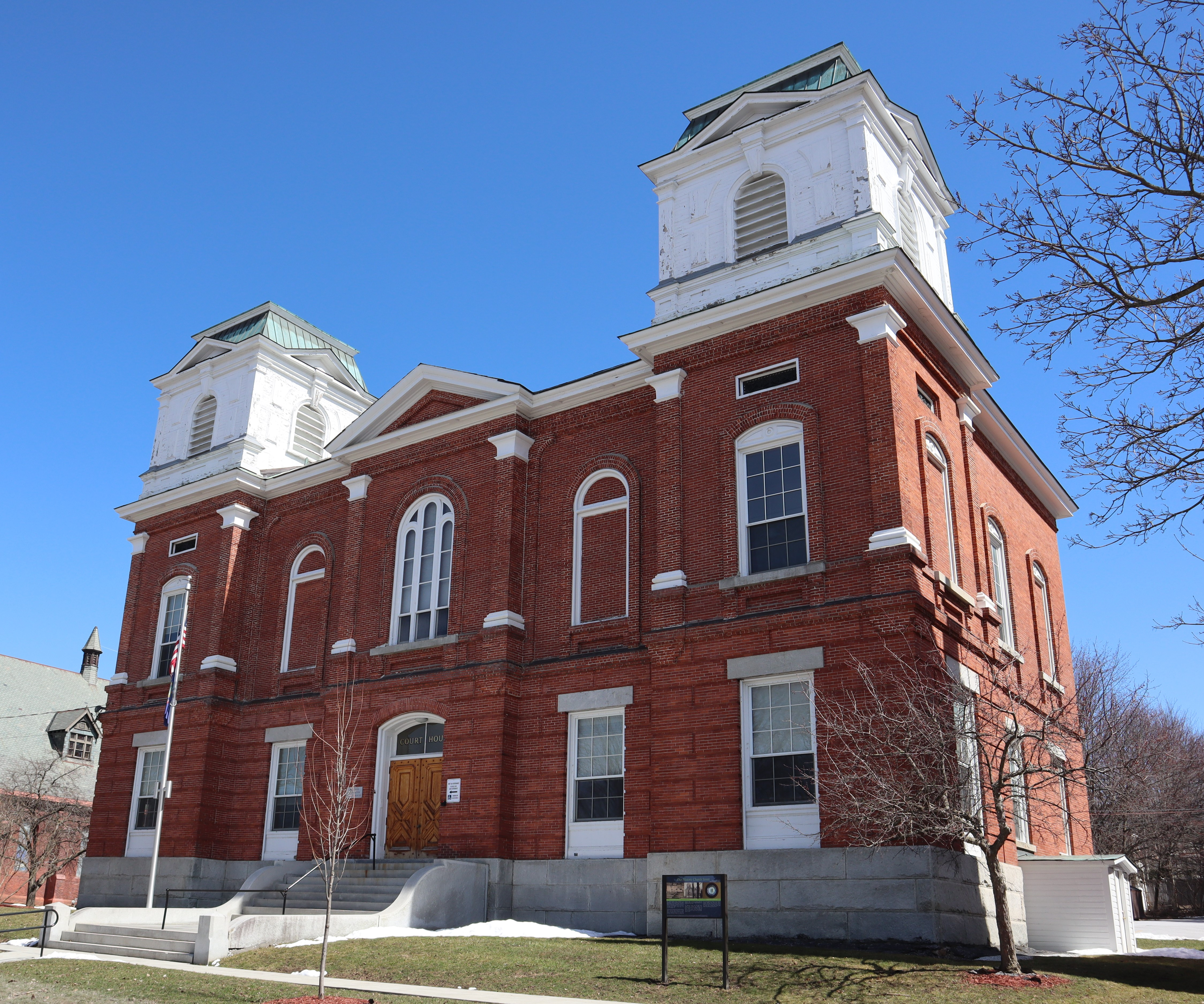
- Franklin County Court House in St. Albans

- Location within the U.S. state of Vermont
- Coordinates: 44°51′27″N 72°54′43″W
- Country: United States
- State: Vermont
- Founded: December 1, 1796
- Named for: Benjamin Franklin
- Shire Town: St. Albans
- Largest city: St. Albans

Area
  - Total: 692 sq mi (1,790 km^{2})
  - Land: 634 sq mi (1,640 km^{2})
  - Water: 58 sq mi (150 km^{2}) 8.4%

Population (2020)
  - Total: 49,946
  - Estimate (2025): 51,177 ▲
  - Density: 78.8/sq mi (30.4/km^{2})
- Time zone: UTC−5 (Eastern)
  - Summer (DST): UTC−4 (EDT)
- Congressional district: At-large

Franklin County is a county located in the U.S. state of Vermont. As of the 2020 census, the population was 49,946. Its county seat is the city of St. Albans. It borders the Canadian province of Quebec. The county was created in 1792 and organized in 1796. Franklin County is part of the Burlington metropolitan area.

== History ==
Franklin County is one of several Vermont counties created from land claimed by Vermont on January 15, 1777, when Vermont declared itself to be a state distinct from New York. The land originally was contested by Massachusetts, New Hampshire, and New York, but it remained undelineated until July 20, 1764, when King George III established the boundary between New Hampshire and New York along the west bank of the Connecticut River, north of Massachusetts and south of the parallel of 45 degrees north latitude. New York assigned the land gained to Albany County. On March 12, 1772, Albany County was partitioned to create Charlotte County, and this situation remained until Vermont's independence from New York and Britain. However, this did not end the contest. In 1772, land surveyors John Collins of Quebec and Thomas Valentine of New York erected survey monuments along what they took to be the 45th parallel of north latitude, intended to be the boundary between New York and Quebec. The Webster–Ashburton Treaty of 1842 said that their measurement errors stand, so the boundary between Vermont and Quebec, and between New York and Quebec, is where Collins and Valentine put the survey monuments, some of which still stand today (see Collins–Valentine line).

On September 3, 1783, as a result of the signing of the Treaty of Paris the Revolutionary War ended with Great Britain recognizing the independence of the United States. Article II of the treaty agreed on boundaries between the United States and British possessions to the north, and included Vermont within the U.S. Vermont's border with Quebec was established at 45 degrees north latitude. In 1792, Franklin County was formed from part of Chittenden County. However, Vermont's government continued to take the position that it was independent of both the United States and Britain, and so it remained until 1791.

The county's namesake is Benjamin Franklin. Chester A. Arthur, the 21st U.S. President, was born in the town of Fairfield. He was one of two Presidents to be born in the state, the other being Calvin Coolidge.

In 2008, the federal government declared the county a disaster area after severe storms and flooding on June 14–17.

== Geography ==
According to the U.S. Census Bureau, the county has an area of 692 square miles (1,790 km^{2}), of which 634 square miles (1,640 km^{2}) is land and 58 square miles (150 km^{2}) (8.4%) is water.

=== Adjacent counties and municipalities ===
- Orleans County – east
- Lamoille County – southeast
- Chittenden County – southwest
- Grand Isle County – west
- Le Haut-Richelieu Regional County Municipality, Quebec – northwest
- Brome-Missisquoi Regional County Municipality, Quebec – north

=== National protected area ===
- Missisquoi National Wildlife Refuge

== Demographics ==
Historical population
Census	Pop.	Note	%±
1800	8,282		—
1810	16,615		100.6%
1820	17,192		3.5%
1830	24,525		42.7%
1840	24,531		0.0%
1850	28,586		16.5%
1860	27,231		−4.7%
1870	30,291		11.2%
1880	30,225		−0.2%
1890	29,755		−1.6%
1900	30,198		1.5%
1910	29,866		−1.1%
1920	30,026		0.5%
1930	29,975		−0.2%
1940	29,601		−1.2%
1950	29,894		1.0%
1960	29,474		−1.4%
1970	31,282		6.1%
1980	34,788		11.2%
1990	39,980		14.9%
2000	45,417		13.6%
2010	47,746		5.1%
2020	49,946		4.6%
2025 (est.)	51,177	▲	2.5%
U.S. Decennial Census; 1790–1960 1900–1990; 1990–2000 2010–2018

=== 2020 census ===
As of the 2020 census, the county had a population of 49,946. Of the residents, 22.1% were under the age of 18 and 17.1% were 65 years of age or older; the median age was 41.3 years. For every 100 females there were 100.2 males, and for every 100 females age 18 and over there were 98.9 males.

The racial makeup of the county was 91.1% White, 0.7% Black or African American, 1.0% American Indian and Alaska Native, 0.6% Asian, 0.6% from some other race, and 5.9% from two or more races. Hispanic or Latino residents of any race comprised 1.8% of the population.

There were 19,918 households in the county, of which 30.5% had children under the age of 18 living with them and 21.8% had a female householder with no spouse or partner present. About 24.6% of all households were made up of individuals and 10.6% had someone living alone who was 65 years of age or older.

There were 22,642 housing units, of which 12.0% were vacant. Among occupied housing units, 74.6% were owner-occupied and 25.4% were renter-occupied. The homeowner vacancy rate was 1.2% and the rental vacancy rate was 5.5%.

Franklin County, Vermont – Racial and ethnic composition Note: the US Census treats Hispanic/Latino as an ethnic category. This table excludes Latinos from the racial categories and assigns them to a separate category. Hispanics/Latinos may be of any race.
Race / Ethnicity (NH = Non-Hispanic)	Pop 2000	Pop 2010	Pop 2020	% 2000	% 2010	% 2020
White alone (NH)	43,434	45,290	45,239	95.63%	94.85%	90.57%
Black or African American alone (NH)	134	200	321	0.29%	0.41%	0.64%
Native American or Alaska Native alone (NH)	680	487	483	1.49%	1.01%	0.96%
Asian alone (NH)	118	223	312	0.25%	0.46%	0.62%
Pacific Islander alone (NH)	10	11	16	0.02%	0.02%	0.03%
Other race alone (NH)	48	12	120	0.10%	0.02%	0.24%
Mixed race or Multiracial (NH)	723	952	2,540	1.59%	1.99%	5.08%
Hispanic or Latino (any race)	270	571	915	0.59%	1.19%	1.83%
Total	45,417	47,746	49,946	100.00%	100.00%	100.00%

=== 2010 census ===
As of the 2010 United States census, there were 47,746 people, 18,513 households, and 12,939 families residing in the county. The population density was 75.3 inhabitants per square mile (29.1/km^{2}). There were 21,588 housing units at an average density of 34.1 per square mile (13.2/km^{2}). Of the 18,513 households, 34.9% had children under the age of 18 living with them, 53.7% were married couples living together, 10.7% had a female householder with no husband present, 30.1% were non-families, and 22.7% of all households were made up of individuals. The average household size was 2.55 and the average family size was 2.97. The median age was 39.6 years.

=== 2006–2010 American Community Survey ===
According to the 2006–2010 American Community Survey 5-year estimates, the median income for a household in the county was $53,623 and the median income for a family was $63,009. Males had a median income of $43,155 versus $36,940 for females. The per capita income for the county was $24,767. About 7.2% of families and 10.5% of the population were below the poverty line, including 13.8% of those under age 18 and 8.7% of those age 65 or over.

== Politics ==
In 1828, Franklin County was won by National Republican Party candidate John Quincy Adams

In 1832, the county was won by Anti-Masonic Party candidate William Wirt.

In 1836, the county was won by Democratic Party candidate Martin Van Buren

From William Henry Harrison in 1840 to Winfield Scott in 1852, the county would vote the Whig Party candidates.

From John C. Frémont in 1856 to Herbert Hoover in 1928 (barring 1912, where the county was won by Progressive Party candidate and former president Theodore Roosevelt), the Republican Party would have a 72-year winning streak in the county.

In 1932, the county was won by Democratic candidate Franklin D. Roosevelt and would be won by him in all four of his presidential runs from 1932 to 1944. During that time, Franklin County, along with Chittenden and Grand Isle Counties would become Democratic enclaves in an otherwise Republican-voting Vermont. The county would also be won by Harry S. Truman in 1948.

Dwight D. Eisenhower was able to win back Franklin County for the Republicans during the 1952 and 1956 elections.

The county would go to Democratic candidates John F. Kennedy in 1960, Lyndon B. Johnson in 1964, and Hubert H. Humphrey in 1968.

Incumbent President Richard Nixon would carry the county in 1972 as would Gerald Ford in 1976.

In 1980 and 1984, the county was won by Republican Ronald Reagan, who would become the last Republican presidential candidate to win Franklin County.

Since Michael Dukakis won the county in 1988, it has been won by Democratic candidates ever since, though Barack Obama has been the only one to win more than 55% of the county's vote.

United States presidential election results for Franklin County, Vermont
Year	Republican		Democratic		Third party(ies)	
Year	No.	%	No.	%	No.	%
1880	3,018	60.07%	1,652	32.88%	354	7.05%
1884	2,619	59.73%	1,396	31.84%	370	8.44%
1888	3,121	67.34%	1,343	28.98%	171	3.69%
1892	2,540	63.22%	1,353	33.67%	125	3.11%
1896	3,444	72.16%	1,150	24.09%	179	3.75%
1900	2,738	66.38%	1,316	31.90%	71	1.72%
1904	2,522	72.22%	881	25.23%	89	2.55%
1908	2,360	66.84%	1,048	29.68%	123	3.48%
1912	1,433	33.16%	1,317	30.48%	1,571	36.36%
1916	2,796	56.41%	2,107	42.51%	54	1.09%
1920	4,869	66.72%	2,342	32.09%	87	1.19%
1924	4,594	67.10%	1,649	24.08%	604	8.82%
1928	6,031	52.23%	5,477	47.43%	40	0.35%
1932	4,999	44.29%	6,179	54.75%	108	0.96%
1936	5,507	44.56%	6,817	55.15%	36	0.29%
1940	5,258	41.21%	7,439	58.30%	63	0.49%
1944	4,374	42.01%	6,036	57.98%	1	0.01%
1948	4,897	46.89%	5,455	52.23%	92	0.88%
1952	6,949	57.82%	5,018	41.75%	51	0.42%
1956	7,125	59.55%	4,840	40.45%	0	0.00%
1960	5,444	43.65%	7,028	56.35%	0	0.00%
1964	3,261	26.98%	8,823	73.00%	2	0.02%
1968	5,218	44.67%	6,027	51.60%	436	3.73%
1972	8,109	67.21%	3,898	32.31%	58	0.48%
1976	6,190	51.64%	5,610	46.80%	186	1.55%
1980	5,998	44.61%	5,914	43.99%	1,533	11.40%
1984	8,683	59.63%	5,755	39.52%	124	0.85%
1988	7,293	49.16%	7,372	49.70%	169	1.14%
1992	5,484	29.25%	8,004	42.69%	5,263	28.07%
1996	4,617	28.49%	8,790	54.24%	2,799	17.27%
2000	8,395	43.74%	9,514	49.57%	1,285	6.69%
2004	8,936	44.86%	10,598	53.20%	386	1.94%
2008	7,853	36.59%	13,179	61.41%	428	1.99%
2012	7,405	37.23%	12,057	60.62%	426	2.14%
2016	8,752	40.88%	9,351	43.67%	3,308	15.45%
2020	11,274	43.65%	13,611	52.69%	945	3.66%
2024	12,490	46.70%	13,280	49.66%	973	3.64%

== Economy ==
=== Industry ===
In 2009, the county had the most dairy farms in the state, 239 out of 1,078.

== Communities ==
=== City ===
- St. Albans (city)

=== Towns ===
- Bakersfield
- Berkshire
- Enosburgh
- Fairfax
- Fairfield
- Fletcher
- Franklin
- Georgia
- Highgate
- Montgomery
- Richford
- Sheldon
- St. Albans (town)
- Swanton

=== Villages ===
Villages are census divisions, but have no separate corporate existence from the towns they are in.

- Enosburg Falls – village of Enosburgh
- Swanton Village – village of Swanton

=== Census-designated places ===
- Bakersfield
- Fairfax
- Highgate Center
- Highgate Springs
- Richford

== Education ==
School districts include:

- Franklin Northeast Supervisory Union
- Franklin Northwest Supervisory Union
- Franklin West Supervisory Union
- Maple Run Unified School District

== See also ==
- National Register of Historic Places listings in Franklin County, Vermont
- Chester Alan Arthur State Historic Site birthplace of President Chester Arthur.
