= Chittenden County, Vermont =

County in Vermont, United States

- County
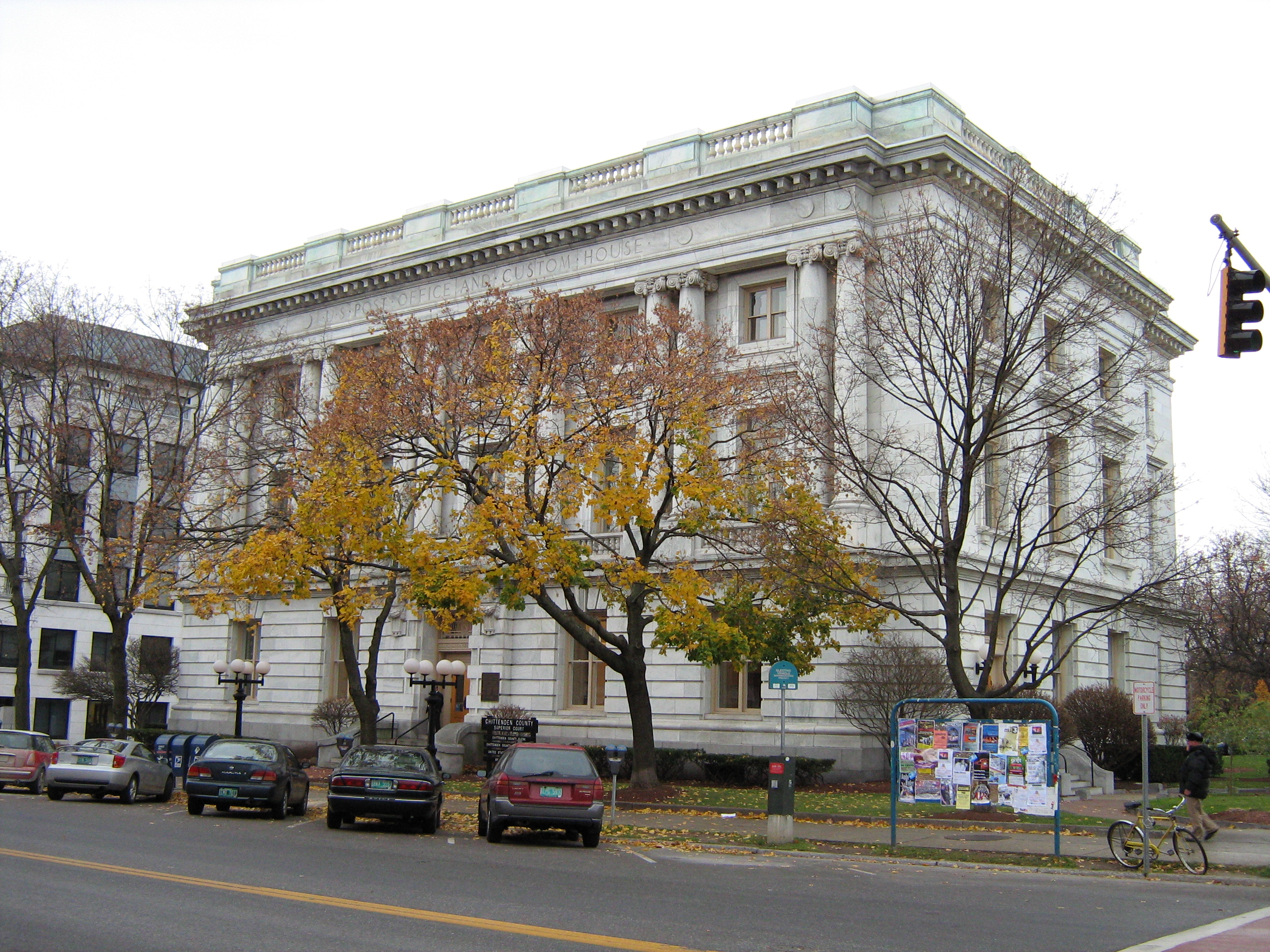
- Chittenden County Superior Court in Burlington

- Location within the U.S. state of Vermont
- Coordinates: 44°28′32″N 73°07′38″W
- Country: United States
- State: Vermont
- Founded: October 22, 1787
- Named for: Thomas Chittenden
- Shire Town: Burlington
- Largest city: Burlington

Area
  - Total: 619 sq mi (1,600 km^{2})
  - Land: 537 sq mi (1,390 km^{2})
  - Water: 83 sq mi (210 km^{2}) 13%

Population (2020)
  - Total: 168,323
  - Estimate (2025): 169,115 ▲
  - Density: 313/sq mi (121/km^{2})
- Time zone: UTC−5 (Eastern)
  - Summer (DST): UTC−4 (EDT)
- Congressional district: At-large

Chittenden County (/ˈtʃɪtəndən/) is the most populous county in the U.S. state of Vermont. As of the 2020 census, its population was 168,323. The county seat is Vermont's most populous municipality, the city of Burlington. The county has over a quarter of Vermont's population and more than twice the population of Vermont's second-most populous county, Rutland. The county also has more than twice the population density of Vermont's second-most dense county, Washington. The county is named for Vermont's first governor and one of the framers of its constitution as an independent republic and later U.S. state, Thomas Chittenden.

It is one of the three counties that comprise the Burlington metropolitan area, along with the counties of Franklin and Grand Isle to the north and northwest, respectively. The University of Vermont, Vermont's largest university, is located in the county, as well as its affiliated hospital, the UVM Medical Center (which is Vermont's largest hospital and collectively forms the largest employer in the state along with the university). Vermont's largest private employer (GlobalFoundries) and largest airport (Patrick Leahy Burlington International Airport) are in the localities of Essex Junction and South Burlington, respectively.

The Vermont Army National Guard is based at Camp Johnson in the town of Colchester. The Vermont Air National Guard is based at the Burlington Air National Guard Base on the grounds of the international airport in South Burlington.

== Geography ==
According to the United States Census Bureau, the county has a total area of 619 square miles (1,600 km^{2}), of which 83 square miles (210 km^{2}) (13%) are covered by water. It is the third-smallest county in Vermont by area.

Originally, Chittenden County contained parts of other counties. It included all of today's Franklin, Grand Isle, and Lamoille counties, and parts of today's Orleans, Washington, and Addison counties.

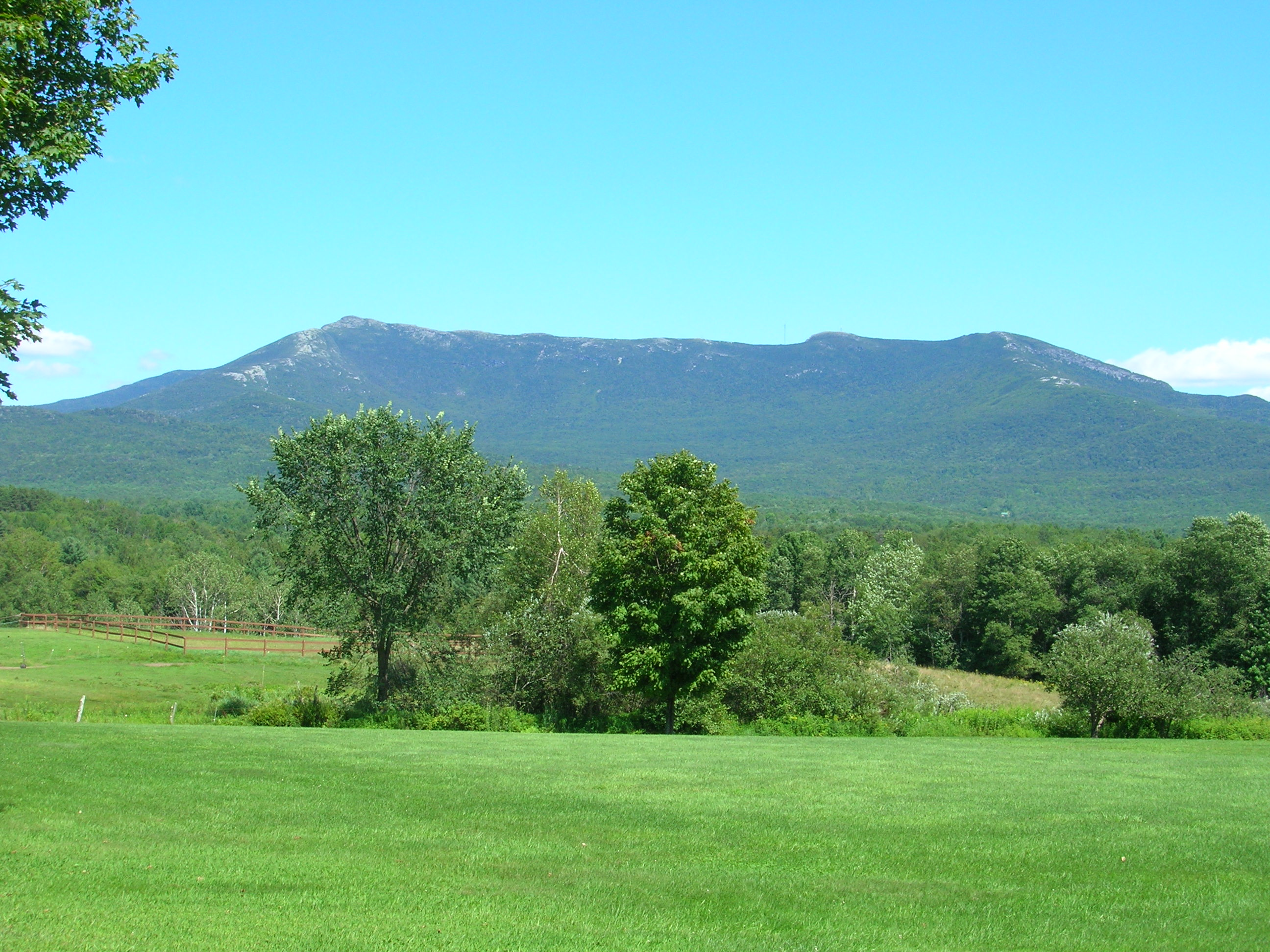
Western face of Mount Mansfield from Underhill, Vermont

The town of Underhill in Chittenden County is home to the highest summit within the state, Mount Mansfield, which has a peak elevation of 4,393 feet (1,339 m) above sea level.

=== Adjacent counties ===
- Addison County – south
- Clinton County, New York – northwest
- Essex County, New York – west
- Franklin County – north
- Grand Isle County – northwest
- Lamoille County – northeast
- Washington County – southeast

=== Major highways ===
- I-89
- I-189
- US 2
- US 7
- US 7 Alt.
- VT 2A
- VT F-5
- VT 15
- VT 17
- VT 116
- VT 117
- VT 127
- VT 128
- VT 289

== Demographics ==
Historical population
Census	Pop.	Note	%±
1790	7,287		—
1800	12,778		75.4%
1810	18,120		41.8%
1820	16,955		−6.4%
1830	21,765		28.4%
1840	22,977		5.6%
1850	29,036		26.4%
1860	28,171		−3.0%
1870	36,480		29.5%
1880	32,792		−10.1%
1890	35,389		7.9%
1900	39,600		11.9%
1910	42,447		7.2%
1920	43,708		3.0%
1930	47,471		8.6%
1940	52,098		9.7%
1950	62,570		20.1%
1960	74,425		18.9%
1970	99,131		33.2%
1980	115,534		16.5%
1990	131,761		14.0%
2000	146,571		11.2%
2010	156,545		6.8%
2020	168,323		7.5%
2025 (est.)	169,115	▲	0.5%
U.S. Decennial Census; 1790–1960 1900–1990; 1990–2000 2010–2020

=== 2020 census ===
As of the 2020 census, the county had a population of 168,323. Of the residents, 17.7% were under the age of 18 and 15.9% were 65 years of age or older; the median age was 37.5 years. For every 100 females there were 95.2 males, and for every 100 females age 18 and over there were 93.0 males.

The racial makeup of the county was 85.7% White, 2.9% Black or African American, 0.2% American Indian and Alaska Native, 4.3% Asian, 0.9% from some other race, and 5.9% from two or more races. Hispanic or Latino residents of any race comprised 2.8% of the population.

There were 69,052 households in the county, of which 24.8% had children under the age of 18 living with them and 26.8% had a female householder with no spouse or partner present. About 30.1% of all households were made up of individuals and 11.1% had someone living alone who was 65 years of age or older.

There were 73,085 housing units, of which 5.5% were vacant. Among occupied housing units, 62.1% were owner-occupied and 37.9% were renter-occupied. The homeowner vacancy rate was 0.5% and the rental vacancy rate was 3.6%.

Chittenden County, Vermont – Racial and ethnic composition Note: the US Census treats Hispanic/Latino as an ethnic category. This table excludes Latinos from the racial categories and assigns them to a separate category. Hispanics/Latinos may be of any race.
Race / Ethnicity (NH = Non-Hispanic)	Pop 2000	Pop 2010	Pop 2020	% 2000	% 2010	% 2020
White alone (NH)	138,422	142,848	142,880	94.44%	91.25%	84.88%
Black or African American alone (NH)	1,283	3,172	4,757	0.87%	2.02%	2.82%
Native American or Alaska Native alone (NH)	380	372	291	0.25%	0.23%	0.17%
Asian alone (NH)	2,901	4,368	7,203	1.97%	2.79%	4.27%
Pacific Islander alone (NH)	28	41	49	0.01%	0.02%	0.02%
Other race alone (NH)	206	172	762	0.14%	0.10%	0.45%
Mixed race or Multiracial (NH)	1,790	2,716	7,630	1.22%	1.73%	4.53%
Hispanic or Latino (any race)	1,561	2,856	4,751	1.06%	1.82%	2.82%
Total	146,571	156,545	168,323	100.00%	100.00%	100.00%

=== 2010 census ===
As of the census of 2010, 156,545 people, 61,827 households, and 36,582 families were residing in the county. The population density was 291.7 inhabitants per square mile (112.6/km^{2}). There were 65,722 housing units at an average density of 122.5 per square mile (47.3/km^{2}).

Of the 61,827 households, 28.8% had children under 18 living with them, 46.4% were married couples living together, 9.1% had a female householder with no husband present, 40.8% were not families, and 27.7% of all households were made up of individuals. The average household size was 2.37, and the average family size was 2.92. The median age was 36.2 years.

The median income for a household in the county was $59,878 and for a family was $78,283. Males had a median income of $49,991 versus $39,213 for females. The per capita income for the county was $31,095. About 6.6% of families and 10.8% of the population were below the poverty line, including 11.8% of those under age 18 and 6.8% of those age 65 or over.

=== Other estimates ===
In 2007, census department estimated that Chittenden had the youngest average age in the state, 37.5. This compares with the actual census in 2000 of 34.2 years.

In 2008, about 29% of the population lived alone; 59% of households consisted of families, and 38% of men and 35% of women, age 15 or older, have never married. About 6% of the population were born in a foreign country, and 8% of residents speak a language other than English at home.

From 2000 to 2008, residents left Chittenden in high numbers for places outside Vermont. Still, population increased slightly, in part due to immigration from foreign countries.

== Government ==
As in all Vermont counties, a small executive function is mostly consolidated at the state level, with a county sheriff and county sheriff's department. The elected sheriff is Daniel Gamelin. Remaining county government is judicial. The area has no "county taxes".

In 2007, median property taxes in the county were $3,809, placing it 265th out of 1,817 counties in the nation with populations over 20,000. This was the highest in Vermont.

=== Judicial ===
The elected state's attorney is Sarah George.

=== Elections ===
United States presidential election results for Chittenden County, Vermont
Year	Republican		Democratic		Third party(ies)	
Year	No.	%	No.	%	No.	%
1880	3,902	64.86%	2,020	33.58%	94	1.56%
1884	3,629	64.57%	1,875	33.36%	116	2.06%
1888	4,149	65.59%	1,940	30.67%	237	3.75%
1892	3,418	62.58%	1,952	35.74%	92	1.68%
1896	4,743	75.26%	1,416	22.47%	143	2.27%
1900	3,907	67.26%	1,822	31.37%	80	1.38%
1904	3,848	70.61%	1,432	26.28%	170	3.12%
1908	3,806	68.29%	1,650	29.61%	117	2.10%
1912	2,368	36.80%	2,266	35.21%	1,801	27.99%
1916	3,786	56.85%	2,772	41.62%	102	1.53%
1920	7,215	66.41%	3,564	32.80%	86	0.79%
1924	8,008	70.96%	2,658	23.55%	620	5.49%
1928	8,156	47.32%	9,052	52.52%	27	0.16%
1932	7,208	43.86%	9,104	55.39%	123	0.75%
1936	7,757	41.32%	10,962	58.39%	56	0.30%
1940	7,926	41.58%	11,069	58.07%	66	0.35%
1944	7,513	41.05%	10,788	58.95%	0	0.00%
1948	8,509	47.97%	8,903	50.19%	327	1.84%
1952	13,533	57.87%	9,746	41.68%	106	0.45%
1956	14,108	57.39%	10,474	42.61%	0	0.00%
1960	13,072	43.53%	16,959	56.47%	0	0.00%
1964	9,050	29.32%	21,817	70.68%	0	0.00%
1968	14,621	45.34%	16,420	50.91%	1,209	3.75%
1972	23,063	58.09%	16,163	40.71%	477	1.20%
1976	22,013	53.23%	17,992	43.51%	1,351	3.27%
1980	18,310	39.00%	18,967	40.40%	9,666	20.59%
1984	30,217	54.11%	24,830	44.46%	798	1.43%
1988	27,380	47.75%	29,185	50.89%	781	1.36%
1992	19,093	27.23%	35,314	50.36%	15,714	22.41%
1996	19,020	29.78%	36,299	56.84%	8,541	13.37%
2000	26,105	36.25%	39,156	54.37%	6,756	9.38%
2004	26,422	34.01%	49,369	63.54%	1,905	2.45%
2008	22,237	26.65%	59,611	71.44%	1,592	1.91%
2012	21,571	27.99%	53,626	69.57%	1,883	2.44%
2016	18,601	22.30%	54,814	65.71%	10,001	11.99%
2020	21,017	21.25%	74,961	75.78%	2,937	2.97%
2024	20,937	21.51%	72,656	74.65%	3,736	3.84%

In 1828, Chittenden County voted for National Republican Party candidate John Quincy Adams and in 1832 voted for Henry Clay.

From William Henry Harrison in 1836 to Winfield Scott in 1852, the county voted for the Whig Party candidates.

From John C. Frémont in 1856 to Calvin Coolidge in 1924, the Republican Party had a 68-year winning streak in the county.

In 1928, Chittenden County was won by Democrat Al Smith, making him the first Democratic candidate to carry the county. The county also voted for Franklin D. Roosevelt in all four of his presidential runs from 1932 to 1944. During that time, Chittenden County, along with Franklin and Grand Isle Counties, became Democratic enclaves in an otherwise Republican-voting Vermont. The county also was won by Harry S. Truman in 1948.

Dwight D. Eisenhower was able to win back Chittenden County for the Republicans during the 1952 and 1956 elections. The county went to Democratic candidates John F. Kennedy in 1960, Lyndon B. Johnson in 1964, and Hubert H. Humphrey in 1968.

Incumbent President Richard Nixon carried the county in 1972, as did Gerald Ford in 1976. In 1980, Jimmy Carter narrowly won the county. In 1984, Ronald Reagan became the last Republican presidential candidate to win Chittenden County.

Since Michael Dukakis won the county in 1988, it has been won by Democratic candidates, and along with Windham County, has been considered one of the bluest counties in Vermont. In recent years, the GOP has turned in some of its worst showings in memory. Since Bill Clinton won the county by a nearly two-to-one margin in 1992, no Republican has managed 40% of the county's vote.

In 2020, Chittenden was the bluest county in the bluest state, backing Joe Biden by a 55% margin.

In gubernatorial elections, Chittenden County is slightly more competitive, as Vermont Republicans are generally far more moderate than at the nationwide level. In the past ten gubernatorial elections, the county has voted for the Republican candidate for governor six times and for the Democratic candidate four times. More recently, incumbent Republican governor Phil Scott won over 69% of the county's votes in the 2024 Vermont gubernatorial election.

== Economy ==
=== Personal income ===
According to the U.S. Census, the median household income for the years 2007 and 2011 was $62,260. The per capita income for the same period was $32,533.

As of the 2010 U.S. Census, the median income for a household in the county was $63,989, and the median income for a family was $59,460. Males had a median income of $38,541 versus $27,853 for females. The per capita income for the county was $33,281. About 4.90% of families and 8.80% of the population were below the poverty line, including 8.00% of those under age 18 and 8.20% of those age 65 or over.

=== Industry ===
Burton Snowboards is headquartered in Burlington.

Essex Junction is home to GlobalFoundries' Burlington Design Center and 200 mm wafer fabrication plant. GlobalFoundries is the largest private employer in the state of Vermont, with approximately 3,000 employees.

Burton Snowboards employs 500 people with a payroll of $28 million in 2008.

==== Retailing ====
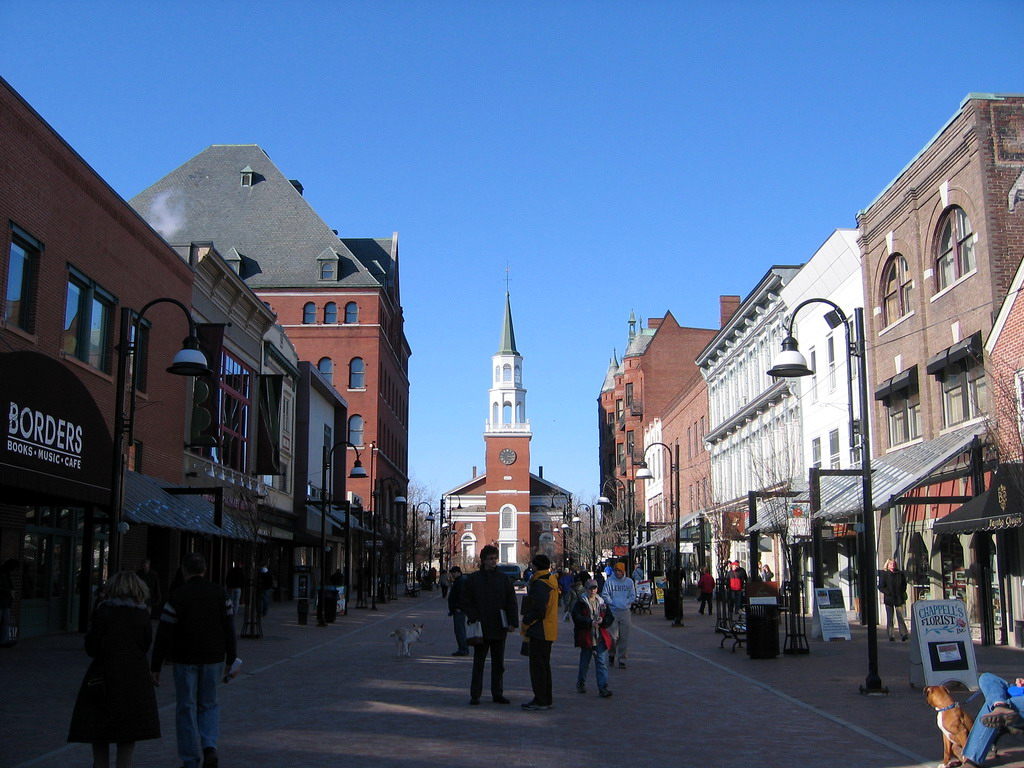
The Church Street Marketplace in downtown Burlington

One measure of economic activity is retail sales. In 2007, Chittenden led the state with 29% of sales, as measured by sales tax reports. This amounted to US$1.52 billion. Four local cities stood among the top five areas in the state: 1- Williston, 2-South Burlington, 4-Colchester, and 5-Burlington.

==== Real estate ====
In 2008, the vacancy rate for office space reached 11%, and was called "historic."

== Education ==
=== K-12 education ===
Several school districts are within the county, including Burlington, Winooski, and Chittenden East. Teachers' salaries in 2007–8 varied from lows of $33,000 to $38,000 annually. Top salaries ranged from $66,000 to $79,000. Teachers pay from 10 to 20% of their health premiums with many contracts at 12%.

School districts include:

- Burlington School District
- Champlain Valley Unified School District
- Colchester School District
- Essex-Westford Educational Community Unified School District
- Milton School District
- Mount Mansfield Modified Union School District (took the former Chittenden East Supervisory Union)
- South Burlington School District
- Winooski Incorporated School District

=== Higher education ===
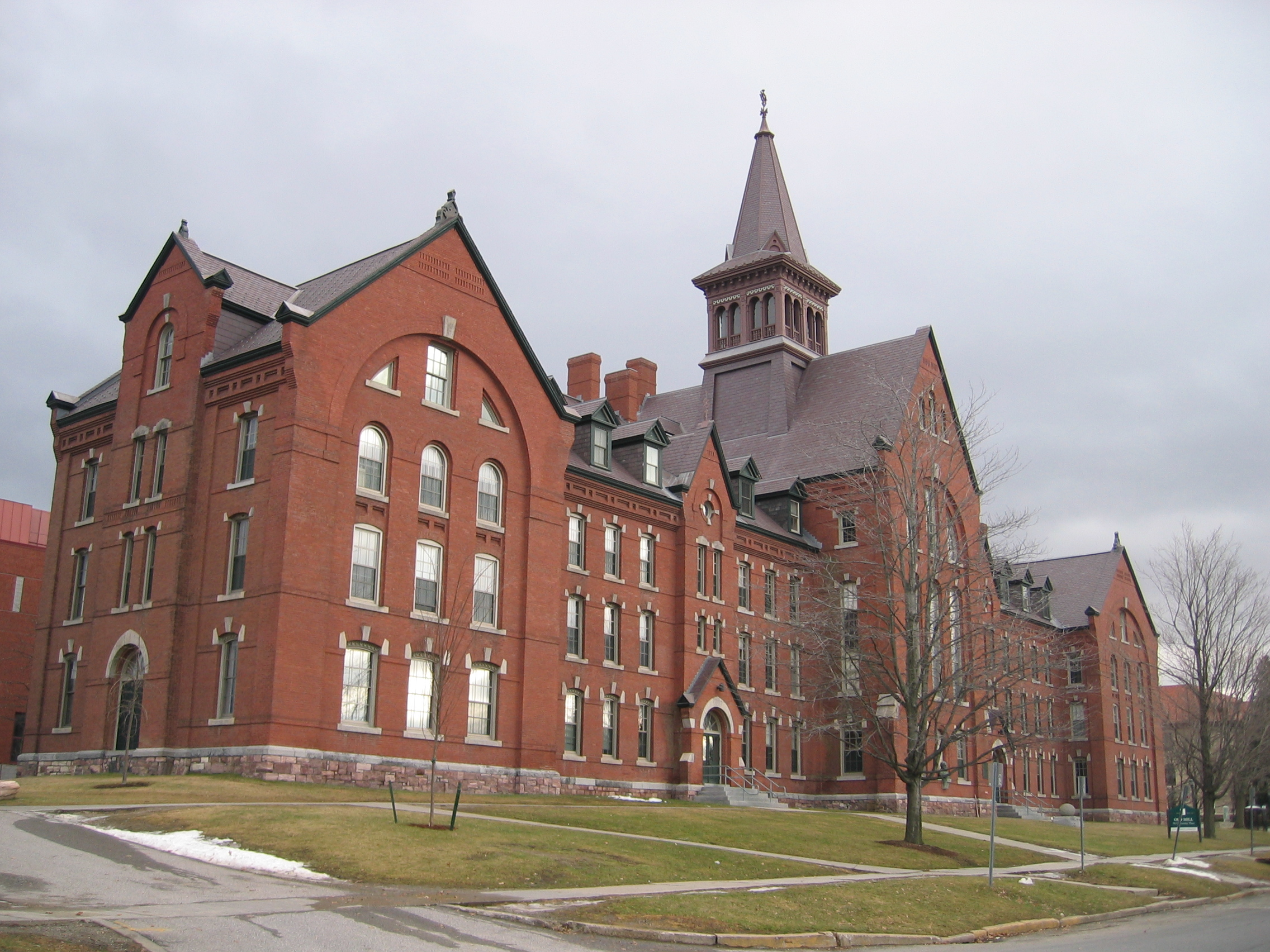
The University of Vermont is Vermont's public flagship research university and is situated in Burlington.

Chittenden County is home to the University of Vermont and Champlain College, which are located in the city of Burlington. Saint Michael's College, the Vermont Center of Southern New Hampshire University, and a branch campus of Albany College of Pharmacy and Health Sciences (Vermont's first pharmacy school) are in the town of Colchester. A branch of the Community College of Vermont is located in Winooski and a satellite campus of Vermont Technical College is in Williston.

== Personal health and safety ==
In the first national survey by Robert Wood Johnson Foundation and the University of Wisconsin in 2010, Vermont ranked the highest in the country for health outcomes. The top county in Vermont was Chittenden.

== Infrastructure ==
Consistent with the rest of New England and other counties in the state of Vermont, the county has little formal county government. Few agencies serve county-wide. One is the Chittenden County Solid Waste District. In 2008, the solid waste District announced that it would charge trash haulers $17/ton for recyclables. Formerly, it was paying $7/ton. The global economy has reduced the demand for recycled materials.

=== Roads ===
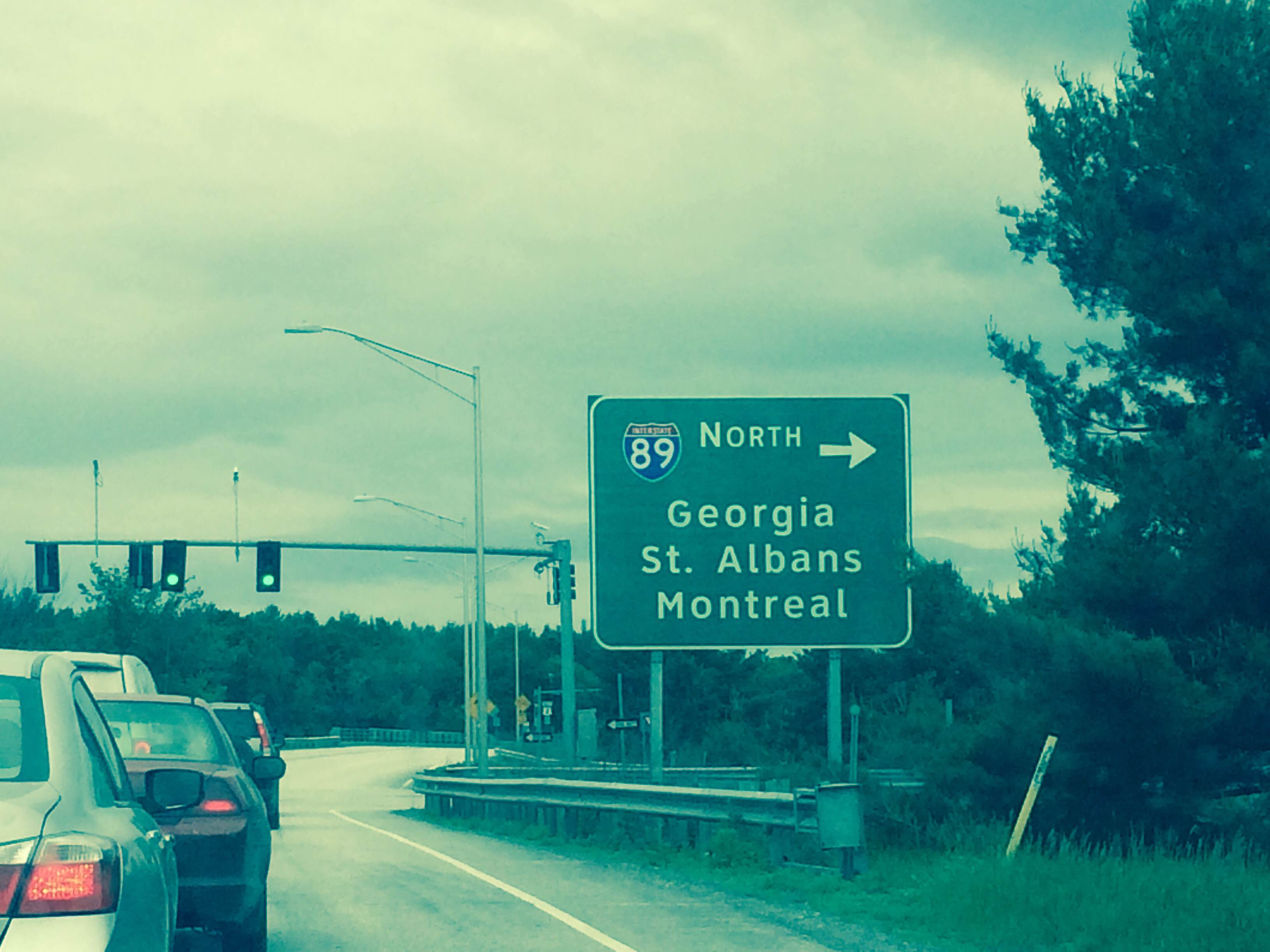
Interstate 89 Exit 17 in Colchester (June 5, 2015)

Interstate 89 crosses Chittenden County initially from east to west, then makes a northward turn in South Burlington to run north along the Lake Champlain shoreline. The full route is generally from southeast to northwest. Seven interchanges are within the county; four provide direct access to U.S. Route 2, which parallels the interstate throughout most of the county. U.S. Route 7, the county's main north–south surface route, is also directly accessible from two interchanges.

The Chittenden County Metropolitan Planning Organization measures traffic, analyzes road conditions, and allocates federal and state funds accordingly.

== Communities ==
=== Cities ===
- Burlington (shire town / county seat)
- Essex Junction
- South Burlington
- Winooski

=== Towns ===
- Bolton
- Charlotte
- Colchester
- Essex
- Hinesburg
- Huntington
- Jericho
- Milton
- Richmond
- Shelburne
- St. George
- Underhill
- Westford
- Williston

=== Villages ===
- Jericho

=== Census-designated places ===
- Bolton
- Bolton Valley
- East Charlotte
- Hanksville
- Hinesburg
- Huntington
- Huntington Center
- Milton
- Richmond
- Shelburne
- St. George
- Underhill Center
- Underhill Flats
- West Charlotte
- Westford

=== Unincorporated communities ===
In Vermont, gores and grants are unincorporated portions of a county which are not part of any town and have limited self-government (if any, as many are uninhabited).

- Buels Gore
- Jonesville
- Stevensville

== In popular culture ==
Chittenden County was showcased in the 1950’s police drama, “The Man Behind the Badge”. The name of the episode was “The Case of the Dying Past”. The Episode, season 2, episode 6 aired Feb 12, 1955.

== See also ==
- National Register of Historic Places listings in Chittenden County, Vermont
