= 1928 United States presidential election in Vermont =

- November 6, 1928

Nominee	Herbert Hoover	Al Smith
Party	Republican	Democratic
Home state	California	New York
Running mate	Charles Curtis	Joseph T. Robinson
Electoral vote	4	0
Popular vote	90,404	44,440
Percentage	66.87%	32.87%

Hoover
50–60%
60–70%
70–80%
80–90%
90–100%
Smith
50–60%
60–70%
90–100%
President before election
Calvin Coolidge
Republican
Elected President
Herbert Hoover
Republican

The 1928 United States presidential election in Vermont took place on November 6, 1928, as part of the 1928 United States presidential election which was held throughout all contemporary 48 states. Voters chose four representatives, or electors to the Electoral College, who voted for president and vice president.

Vermont voted for the Republican nominee, former Secretary of Commerce Herbert Hoover of California, over the Democratic nominee, Governor Alfred E. Smith of New York. Hoover's running mate was Senate Majority Leader Charles Curtis of Kansas, while Smith ran with Senator Joseph Taylor Robinson of Arkansas.

Hoover took 66.87% of the vote, to Smith's 32.87%, a margin of 34%. Vermont historically was a bastion of Northeastern Republicanism, and by 1928 it had gone Republican in every presidential election since the founding of the Republican Party. From 1856 to 1924, Vermont had had the longest streak of voting Republican of any state, having never voted Democratic before, and this tradition continued amidst a third consecutive nationwide Republican landslide in 1928.

While Hoover won the state in a decisive landslide, Smith's performance nevertheless represented a dramatic Democratic improvement in the state. In 1924, Vermont had been the most Republican state in the union, with Republican Calvin Coolidge winning 78.22% to only 15.67% for Democrat John W. Davis, a massive margin of 62.55%. Vermont, like New England and the Northeast as a whole, swung strongly toward the Democrats in 1928, even as Hoover won another decisive Republican victory nationally. Thus in the 1928 election, Vermont fell to being only the fifth most Republican state in the nation after Kansas, Michigan, Maine and Washington, about 16% more Republican than the national average.

Hoover carried thirteen of the state's fourteen counties, many by large margins. However, the three northwestern counties of Vermont would by 1932 become staunch Democratic enclaves in an otherwise Republican state, and in 1928 movement toward the Democratic Party in this region would first manifest itself, as Smith won over the votes of urban and ethnic Catholic working-class voters. In 1928, Smith became the first Democrat to win Chittenden County, the state's most populous county, home to the state's largest city, Burlington. Just four years earlier, in 1924, Republican Calvin Coolidge had received over 70% of the vote in the county. Consequently, Hoover became the first Republican to ever win without Chittenden County. This is the last election in which Vermont had more than three electoral votes as it would lose its 2nd district in the 1930 census and has maintained an at large district ever since.

== Results ==
1928 United States presidential election in Vermont
Party	Candidate	Votes	Percentage	Electoral votes
Republican	Herbert Hoover	90,404	66.87%	3
Democratic	Alfred E. Smith	44,440	32.87%	0
Prohibition	William F. Varney	338	0.25%	0
N/A	Write-ins	9	0.01%	0
Totals		135,191	100.00%	4

=== Results by county ===
County	Herbert Clark Hoover Republican		Alfred Emmanuel Smith Democratic		Various candidates Other parties		Margin		Total votes cast
County	#	%	#	%	#	%	#	%	Total votes cast
Addison	5,247	72.09%	2,003	27.52%	28	0.38%	3,244	44.57%	7,278
Bennington	6,114	63.49%	3,498	36.32%	18	0.19%	2,616	27.17%	9,630
Caledonia	6,616	78.07%	1,832	21.62%	26	0.31%	4,784	56.46%	8,474
Chittenden	8,156	47.32%	9,052	52.52%	27	0.16%	-896	-5.20%	17,235
Essex	1,703	67.74%	805	32.02%	6	0.24%	898	35.72%	2,514
Franklin	6,031	52.23%	5,477	47.43%	40	0.35%	554	4.80%	11,548
Grand Isle	830	50.55%	801	48.78%	11	0.67%	29	1.77%	1,642
Lamoille	3,262	84.64%	576	14.95%	16	0.42%	2,686	69.69%	3,854
Orange	5,223	84.69%	914	14.82%	30	0.49%	4,309	69.87%	6,167
Orleans	5,561	80.65%	1,320	19.14%	14	0.20%	4,241	61.51%	6,895
Rutland	12,621	59.36%	8,609	40.49%	32	0.15%	4,012	18.87%	21,262
Washington	9,891	68.91%	4,408	30.71%	54	0.38%	5,483	38.20%	14,353
Windham	8,410	77.70%	2,398	22.15%	16	0.15%	6,012	55.54%	10,824
Windsor	10,739	79.46%	2,747	20.33%	29	0.21%	7,992	59.13%	13,515
Totals	90,404	66.87%	44,440	32.87%	347	0.26%	45,964	34.00%	135,191

==== Counties that flipped from Republican to Democratic ====
- Chittenden

== See also ==
- United States presidential elections in Vermont
