= 1988 United States presidential election in Vermont =

- November 8, 1988
- Turnout: 70.9%

| Nominee | George H. W. Bush | Michael Dukakis |
| Party | Republican | Democratic |
| Home state | Texas | Massachusetts |
| Running mate | Dan Quayle | Lloyd Bentsen |
| Electoral vote | 3 | 0 |
| Popular vote | 124,331 | 115,775 |
| Percentage | 51.10% | 47.58% |

Bush
40–50%
50–60%
60–70%
70–80%
80–90%
Dukakis
40–50%
50–60%
60–70%
70–80%
President before election
Ronald Reagan
Republican
Elected President
George H. W. Bush
Republican

The 1988 United States presidential election in Vermont took place on November 8, 1988, as part of the 1988 United States presidential election, which was held throughout all 50 states and D.C. Voters chose three representatives, or electors to the Electoral College, who voted for president and vice president.

Vermont voted for the Republican nominee, Vice President George H. W. Bush, over the Democratic nominee, Massachusetts Governor Michael Dukakis, by a narrow margin of 3.52%. Bush took 51.10% of the vote to Dukakis's 47.58%. This was one of only two times in the state's history (the other being William Howard Taft's 1.91% victory margin in 1912) that Vermont was decided by a margin of less than 5.00%, as the state spent little time as a swing state during its transition from being the most historically Republican state to the most Democratic.

While the Republicans held onto Vermont's three electoral votes once more, the closeness of the race represented a turning point in the state's political history. Vermont had once been one of the most Republican areas in the country, historically having voted Republican more times than any other state, often by landslide margins. From 1856 to 1984, the state had gone Republican in every presidential election except for the 1964 Democratic landslide. Despite this history, Vermont was considered a swing state in 1988, and the Dukakis campaign targeted it in its electoral strategy. In this election, the state weighed in as about 4% more Democratic than the nation. With the exception of Lyndon Johnson in 1964, Dukakis’ performance was the best of any Democratic presidential candidate in Vermont until Bill Clinton won the state in 1992.

Bush lost Addison and Windham counties, which had only voted Democratic once, in 1964, thus he became the first Republican to ever win without either of those counties. Like the rest of liberal and secular New England, Vermont in the 1980s began moving to the Democratic Party as the Republican Party became increasingly dominated by conservatives, Southerners, and Evangelical Christians. As of the 2024 presidential election, this is the last time that a Republican would carry the state of Vermont in a presidential election, and in the following three decades, it would become regarded as one of the bluest of blue states. It would also be the last time the Republicans would carry the counties of Bennington, Lamoille, Rutland, Washington and Windsor. This is also the last time that a Republican has won over 60% of the vote in any county in Vermont, which Bush did in the counties of Caledonia and Essex. Additionally, with the results in the concurrent House and Senate elections, it is the last time that Vermont voted Republican in all three federal statewide offices simultaneously.

To date, this is the last time that the cities of Rutland and Vergennes, as well as the towns of Albany, Arlington, Berlin, Bethel, Bolton, Brandon, Brookline, Cambridge, Chester, Colchester, Dover, East Montpelier, Elmore, Essex, Fairlee, Goshen, Grafton, Grand Isle, Granville, Halifax, Hardwick, Hartford, Hartland, Hubbardton, Hyde Park, Jamaica, Jericho, Johnson, Killington, Kirby, Ludlow, Middletown Springs, Moretown, Morristown, Mount Holly, Peacham, Pomfret, Proctor, Randolph, Reading, Rochester, Salisbury, Shaftsbury, Sharon, Shelburne, Shrewsbury, South Hero, Springfield, St. Albans, St. George, Stockbridge, Stowe, Sudbury, Townshend, Waitsfield, Walden, Waltham, Waterbury, Weathersfield, West Windsor, Williston, Wilmington, Winhall, Wolcott, and Woodstock voted Republican.

== Results ==
1988 United States presidential election in Vermont
| Party | Candidate | Votes | Percentage | Electoral votes |
|---|---|---|---|---|
| Republican | George H. W. Bush | 124,331 | 51.10% | 3 |
| Democratic | Michael Dukakis | 115,775 | 47.58% | 0 |
| No party | Write-ins | 1,140 | 0.47% | 0 |
| Libertarian | Ron Paul | 1,003 | 0.41% | 0 |
| Independent | Lyndon LaRouche | 275 | 0.11% | 0 |
| New Alliance | Lenora Fulani | 205 | 0.08% | 0 |
| America First | David Duke | 190 | 0.08% | 0 |
| Peace and Freedom | Herbert G. Lewin | 161 | 0.07% | 0 |
| Liberty Union (Socialist) | Willa Kenoyer | 142 | 0.06% | 0 |
| Socialist Workers | James Warren | 111 | 0.05% | 0 |
| Totals | | 243,333 | 100.00% | 3 |
| Voter Turnout (Voting age/Registered) | | | | 59%/70% |

=== Results by county ===
| County | George H.W. Bush Republican | | Michael Dukakis Democratic | | Various candidates Write-ins | | Ron Paul Libertarian | | Various candidates Other parties | | Margin | | Total votes cast |
| County | # | % | # | % | # | % | # | % | # | % | # | % | Total votes cast |
|---|---|---|---|---|---|---|---|---|---|---|---|---|---|
| Addison | 6,773 | 49.09% | 6,791 | 49.22% | 63 | 0.46% | 93 | 0.67% | 77 | 0.56% | -18 | -0.13% | 13,797 |
| Bennington | 8,387 | 53.34% | 7,174 | 45.62% | 39 | 0.25% | 55 | 0.35% | 70 | 0.45% | 1,213 | 7.72% | 15,725 |
| Caledonia | 6,915 | 61.13% | 4,251 | 37.58% | 57 | 0.50% | 52 | 0.46% | 37 | 0.33% | 2,664 | 23.55% | 11,312 |
| Chittenden | 27,380 | 47.75% | 29,185 | 50.89% | 266 | 0.46% | 301 | 0.52% | 214 | 0.37% | -1,805 | -3.14% | 57,346 |
| Essex | 1,535 | 64.20% | 837 | 35.01% | 5 | 0.21% | 6 | 0.25% | 8 | 0.33% | 698 | 29.19% | 2,391 |
| Franklin | 7,293 | 49.16% | 7,372 | 49.70% | 61 | 0.41% | 49 | 0.33% | 59 | 0.40% | -79 | -0.54% | 14,834 |
| Grand Isle | 1,316 | 48.24% | 1,369 | 50.18% | 7 | 0.26% | 22 | 0.81% | 14 | 0.51% | -53 | -1.94% | 2,728 |
| Lamoille | 4,433 | 54.51% | 3,561 | 43.78% | 49 | 0.60% | 43 | 0.53% | 47 | 0.58% | 872 | 10.73% | 8,133 |
| Orange | 6,151 | 54.35% | 4,977 | 43.97% | 56 | 0.49% | 79 | 0.70% | 55 | 0.49% | 1,174 | 10.38% | 11,318 |
| Orleans | 5,257 | 54.70% | 4,224 | 43.95% | 69 | 0.72% | 25 | 0.26% | 36 | 0.37% | 1,033 | 10.75% | 9,611 |
| Rutland | 14,482 | 55.15% | 11,496 | 43.78% | 118 | 0.45% | 62 | 0.24% | 103 | 0.39% | 2,986 | 11.37% | 26,261 |
| Washington | 13,253 | 50.40% | 12,690 | 48.26% | 138 | 0.52% | 77 | 0.29% | 136 | 0.52% | 563 | 2.14% | 26,294 |
| Windham | 8,572 | 45.96% | 9,839 | 52.75% | 77 | 0.41% | 48 | 0.26% | 117 | 0.63% | -1,267 | -6.79% | 18,653 |
| Windsor | 12,584 | 50.48% | 12,009 | 48.17% | 135 | 0.54% | 91 | 0.37% | 111 | 0.45% | 575 | 2.31% | 24,930 |
| Totals | 124,331 | 51.10% | 115,775 | 47.58% | 1,140 | 0.47% | 1,003 | 0.41% | 1,084 | 0.45% | 8,556 | 3.52% | 243,333 |

==== Counties that flipped from Republican to Democratic ====
- Addison
- Chittenden
- Franklin
- Grand Isle
- Windham

== See also ==
- United States presidential elections in Vermont
