= 1964 United States presidential election in Vermont =

- November 3, 1964

Nominee	Lyndon B. Johnson	Barry Goldwater
Party	Democratic	Republican
Home state	Texas	Arizona
Running mate	Hubert Humphrey	William E. Miller
Electoral vote	3	0
Popular vote	108,127	54,942
Percentage	66.30%	33.69%

Johnson
50–60%
60–70%
70–80%
80–90%
90–100%
Goldwater
50–60%
60–70%
70–80%
80–90%
Tie
50%
President before election
Lyndon B. Johnson
Democratic
Elected President
Lyndon B. Johnson
Democratic

The 1964 United States presidential election in Vermont took place on November 3, 1964, as part of the 1964 United States presidential election in which all 50 states plus the District of Columbia participated. Vermont voters chose 3 electors to represent them in the Electoral College via a popular vote pitting incumbent Democratic President Lyndon B. Johnson and his running mate, Senate Majority Whip Hubert Humphrey, against Republican challenger and Senator Barry Goldwater from Arizona and his running mate and Chair of the Republican National Committee, William E. Miller. It was the first time in Vermont's history that the state voted for the Democratic candidate, and the first time since the Republican Party's foundation that the state voted against its candidate.

Vermont voted overwhelmingly for Lyndon B. Johnson with 66.30% of the vote to Goldwater's 33.69%, a Democratic victory margin of 32.61%. With this decisive win, Johnson became the first Democratic presidential candidate to ever win Vermont, breaking a Republican voting streak of 104 years, beginning in 1856. Johnson's landslide margin of victory in this traditional Republican stronghold even made the state ten percentage points more Democratic than the national average in the 1964 election. Along with winning the state for the first time, Johnson was also the first Democratic presidential candidate to carry Addison, Bennington, Caledonia, Rutland, Orange, Orleans, Windham and Windsor Counties. Vermont would not vote for the Democratic nominee again until 1992, after which it has always gone Democratic.

== Results ==
1964 United States presidential election in Vermont
Party	Candidate	Votes	Percentage	Electoral votes
Democratic	Lyndon B. Johnson (incumbent)	108,127	66.30%	3
Republican	Barry Goldwater	54,942	33.69%	0
No party	Write-ins	20	0.01%	0
Totals		163,089	100.00%	3
Voter turnout (voting age/registered)				70%/78%

=== Results by county ===
County	Lyndon B. Johnson Democratic		Barry Goldwater Republican		Various candidates Write-ins		Margin		Total votes cast
County	#	%	#	%	#	%	#	%	Total votes cast
Addison	4,758	57.62%	3,500	42.38%			1,258	15.24%	8,258
Bennington	7,359	65.39%	3,895	34.61%			3,464	30.78%	11,254
Caledonia	5,732	63.76%	3,258	36.24%			2,474	27.52%	8,990
Chittenden	21,817	70.68%	9,050	29.32%			12,767	41.36%	30,867
Essex	1,673	69.05%	750	30.95%			923	38.10%	2,423
Franklin	8,823	73.00%	3,261	26.98%	2	0.02%	5,562	46.02%	12,086
Grand Isle	996	66.27%	506	33.67%	1	0.07%	490	32.60%	1,503
Lamoille	2,376	53.85%	2,036	46.15%			340	7.70%	4,412
Orange	3,918	58.99%	2,723	41.00%	1	0.02%	1,195	17.99%	6,642
Orleans	4,898	61.95%	3,009	38.05%			1,889	23.90%	7,907
Rutland	13,241	64.89%	7,165	35.11%			6,076	29.78%	20,406
Washington	12,002	67.57%	5,750	32.37%	11	0.06%	6,252	35.20%	17,763
Windham	8,371	66.67%	4,180	33.29%	4	0.03%	4,191	33.38%	12,555
Windsor	12,163	67.49%	5,859	32.51%	1	0.01%	6,304	34.98%	18,023
Totals	108,127	66.30%	54,942	33.69%	20	0.01%	53,185	32.61%	163,089

==== Counties that flipped from Republican to Democratic ====
- Addison
- Bennington
- Caledonia
- Essex
- Lamoille
- Orange
- Orleans
- Rutland
- Washington
- Windham
- Windsor

== Analysis ==
Vermont historically was a bastion of Northeastern Republicanism, and by 1964 it had gone Republican in every presidential election since the founding of the Republican Party. However, in 1964 this streak came to an end when the GOP nominated staunch conservative Barry Goldwater, who was widely seen in the liberal Northeastern United States as a right-wing extremist; he had voted against the Civil Rights Act of 1964, and the Johnson campaign portrayed him as a warmonger who as president would provoke a nuclear war. Thus, Goldwater performed especially weakly in liberal northeastern states like Vermont, and for the first time in history, a Democratic presidential candidate swept every Northeastern state in 1964. Not only did Johnson win every Northeastern state, but he won all of them with landslides of over 60% of the vote, including Vermont, which weighed in as the ninth most Democratic state in the nation. Goldwater lost the 1964 election in a nationwide landslide, but the loss in Vermont was especially severe from a historical perspective.

Johnson swept all 14 counties in Vermont, breaking 60% of the vote in 11 of them. In the northwestern part of the state, Johnson broke 70% of the vote in 2 counties: Chittenden County, the most populous county, home to the state's largest city, Burlington, as well as Franklin County. The northwestern three counties of Vermont had long been Democratic enclaves in an otherwise Republican state, and remained the most Democratic region in 1964, even as the rest of the state finally joined them in voting Democratic. Johnson's weakest performance was in Lamoille County, where he carried 53.85% of the vote to Goldwater's 46.15% – a strong performance for the Democrats nonetheless.

After 1964, the state would revert to voting GOP again in 1968 and remain in the Republican column for another twenty-year streak through 1988, although the Republicans would never recover the overwhelming margins by which they once dominated Vermont. The results of 1964, with Goldwater dominating the Deep South while losing the Northeast, would foreshadow the future political trajectory of the nation. Like the rest of the Northeast, Vermont would finally flip to the Democrats for good in 1992, ultimately forming what would be known as the Blue Wall. As the GOP became increasingly dominated by Southerners, conservatives, and evangelicals, the 1964 election would foreshadow Vermont's modern-day status as one of the most Democratic and left-wing states in the nation.

Johnson's landslide win in Vermont would remain the strongest Democratic victory in the state until the elections of Barack Obama, who outperformed Johnson in Vermont in both 2008 and 2012. In 2020, Joe Biden outperformed Johnson's margin but not his vote share (though due to that election being significantly closer, Vermont was still the most Democratic state in the union). This marked the end of the longest presidential voting streak of any party in any state.

Vermont was one of the three states that voted with a certain party for the first time in this election, the other two being Alaska and Georgia.

== See also ==
- United States presidential elections in Vermont
