= 1992 United States presidential election in Vermont =

- November 3, 1992
- Turnout: 76.37% ▲5.47 pp

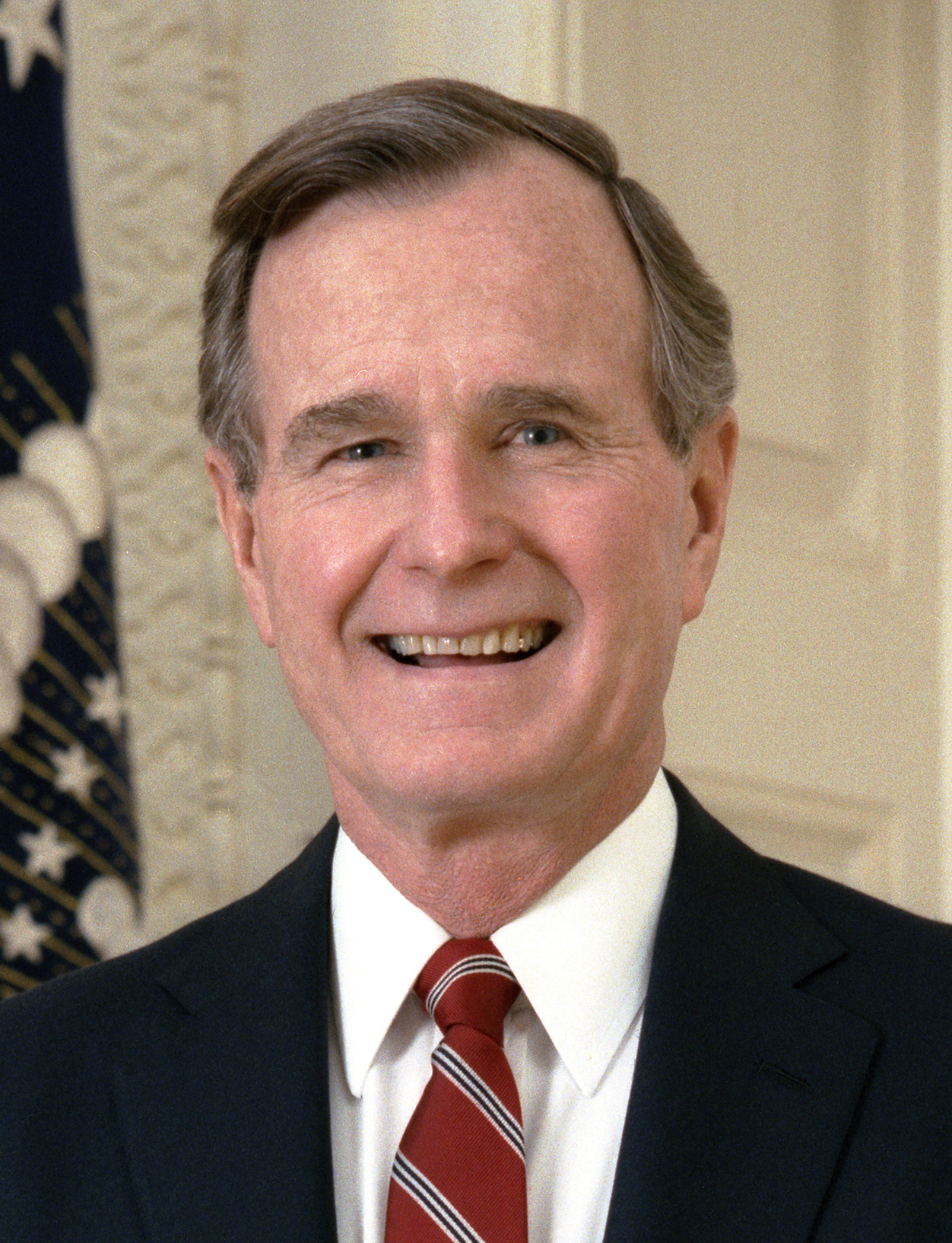

Nominee	Bill Clinton	George H. W. Bush	Ross Perot
Party	Democratic	Republican	Independent
Home state	Arkansas	Texas	Texas
Running mate	Al Gore	Dan Quayle	James Stockdale
Electoral vote	3	0	0
Popular vote	133,592	88,122	65,991
Percentage	46.11%	30.42%	22.78%

Clinton
30–40%
40–50%
50–60%
60–70%
Bush
30–40%
40–50%
70–80%
Perot
30–40%
40–50%
President before election
George H. W. Bush
Republican
Elected President
Bill Clinton
Democratic

The 1992 United States presidential election in Vermont took place on November 3, 1992, as part of the 1992 United States presidential election. Voters chose three representatives, or electors to the Electoral College, who voted for president and vice president.

Vermont was won by Democratic Governor Bill Clinton of Arkansas, taking 46.11% of the popular vote over incumbent Republican President George H. W. Bush of Texas, who took 30.42%, a victory margin of 15.69%. Independent Texas billionaire Ross Perot finished in third, with 22.78% of the popular vote. Clinton ultimately won the national vote, defeating incumbent President Bush.

This election would prove to be a re-aligning one for the state of Vermont. Clinton's decisive double-digit victory in the state, including a Democratic sweep of all 14 counties, represented a dramatic turnaround for a state that had historically been known for being one of the most solidly Republican ones in the country. Since 1856, Vermont voted Republican in every presidential election except 1964, and was one of only two states (along with Maine) to vote against Franklin D. Roosevelt in all four of his presidential runs. As such, Clinton became only the second Democrat to ever carry Vermont in a presidential election, and the first non-incumbent Democrat to do so.

As of 2024, this is the only time that a Democratic presidential nominee carried Vermont without receiving a majority of the vote.

To date, this is the last time that the towns of Bakersfield, Northfield, and Wardsboro voted Republican.

Perot won a plurality of votes cast in four municipalities: Stratton, Victory, Sheffield and Searsburg, receiving 44.4% of the vote in Stratton, 43.2% in Victory, 39.4% in Sheffield and 35.9% in Searsburg.

== Results ==
1992 United States presidential election in Vermont
Party	Candidate	Votes	Percentage	Electoral votes
Democratic	Bill Clinton	133,592	46.11%	3
Republican	George H. W. Bush (incumbent)	88,122	30.42%	0
Independent	Ross Perot	65,991	22.78%	0
Libertarian	Andre Marrou	501	0.17%	0
Write-ins		488	0.17%	0
New Alliance/Liberty Union (Note: Fulani was a fusion candidate for the New Alliance and Liberty Union parties.)	Lenora Fulani	429	0.15%	0
Natural Law	Dr. John Hagelin	315	0.11%	0
VT Taxpayers'	Howard Phillips	124	0.04%	0
Socialist Workers	James Warren	82	0.03%	0
Democrats for Economic Recovery	Lyndon LaRouche	57	0.02%	0
Totals		289,701	100.0%	3

=== Results by county ===
County	Bill Clinton Democratic		George H.W. Bush Republican		Ross Perot Independent		Various candidates Other parties		Margin		Total votes cast
County	#	%	#	%	#	%	#	%	#	%	Total votes cast
Addison	8,092	47.53%	5,034	29.57%	3,777	22.18%	123	0.72%	3,058	17.96%	17,026
Bennington	8,178	44.89%	5,895	32.36%	4,023	22.08%	120	0.66%	2,283	12.53%	18,216
Caledonia	4,948	37.88%	4,571	34.99%	3,458	26.47%	85	0.65%	377	2.89%	13,062
Chittenden	35,314	50.36%	19,093	27.23%	15,202	21.68%	512	0.73%	16,221	23.13%	70,121
Essex	1,092	36.45%	1,038	34.65%	845	28.20%	21	0.70%	54	1.80%	2,996
Franklin	8,004	42.69%	5,484	29.25%	5,146	27.44%	117	0.62%	2,520	13.44%	18,751
Grand Isle	1,444	42.73%	1,012	29.95%	893	26.43%	30	0.89%	432	12.78%	3,379
Lamoille	4,459	43.97%	2,936	28.95%	2,674	26.37%	73	0.72%	1,523	15.02%	10,142
Orange	5,774	43.06%	4,249	31.69%	3,283	24.48%	104	0.78%	1,525	11.37%	13,410
Orleans	4,721	41.01%	3,572	31.03%	3,135	27.23%	85	0.74%	1,149	9.98%	11,513
Rutland	12,829	41.19%	10,963	35.20%	7,190	23.09%	162	0.52%	1,866	5.99%	31,144
Washington	13,452	45.85%	9,424	32.12%	6,274	21.39%	188	0.64%	4,028	13.73%	29,338
Windham	11,414	53.31%	5,816	27.16%	4,014	18.75%	167	0.78%	5,598	26.15%	21,411
Windsor	13,871	47.52%	9,035	30.95%	6,077	20.82%	209	0.72%	4,836	16.57%	29,192
Totals	133,592	46.11%	88,122	30.42%	65,991	22.78%	1,996	0.69%	45,470	15.69%	289,701

==== Counties that flipped from Republican to Democratic ====
- Bennington
- Caledonia
- Essex
- Lamoille
- Orange
- Orleans
- Rutland
- Washington
- Windsor

== See also ==
- United States presidential elections in Vermont
