= October 1982 =

Month of 1982

The following events occurred in October 1982:

<<	October 1982					>>
Su	Mo	Tu	We	Th	Fr	Sa
					1	2
3	4	5	6	7	8	9
10	11	12	13	14	15	16
17	18	19	20	21	22	23
24	25	26	27	28	29	30
31

== October 1, 1982 (Friday) ==
- Helmut Kohl replaced Helmut Schmidt as Chancellor of West Germany through a constructive vote of no confidence, a procedure authorized by Article 67 of the nation's constitution. Under the law, the lower house of the German parliament, the Bundestag, was authorized to elect a person to replace the incumbent chancellor and, if the replacement received a majority of votes, to request the Federal President to dismiss the incumbent and to appoint the elected successor as the new head of government. With all 495 Bundestag members present, and 247 votes required for a majority, Kohl, the Leader of the Opposition and of the Christian Democratic Union party, was nominated as the potential successor, and was approved over Chancellor Schmidt, 256 to 235, with four members abstaining. As required by the West German constitution, President Karl Carstens dismissed Schmidt and appointed Kohl, who was sworn in as Chancellor the same day.
- Sony launched the first consumer compact disc (CD) player, the CDP-101.
- The new EPCOT Center was opened as the second theme park at Walt Disney World near Orlando, Florida, exactly 11 years after the opening of the original park, which was referred to thereafter as the "Magic Kingdom". The park, envisioned by Walt Disney prior to his 1966 death as the Experimental Prototype Community of Tomorrow, proclaimed that its goal was "the celebration of human achievement, particularly technological innovation and international culture".

== October 2, 1982 (Saturday) ==
- In Spain, Prime Minister Leopoldo Calvo-Sotelo issued orders for the arrests of conspirators who were preparing to carry out a coup d'état to overthrow the Spanish government on October 27, the day before elections for the Congress of Deputies. Lieutenant General Emilio Manglano, director of CESID, Spain's intelligence service, had alerted Premier Calvo-Sotelo, Defense Minister Alberto Oliart and Interior Minister Juan José Rosón of CESID's discovery of the plot. Colonel Luis Muñoz Gutiérrez, Colonel Jesús Crespo Cuspinera and Crespo's brother, Lieutenant Colonel José Crespo Cuspinera were arrested hours after the meeting.
- Died: Muktananda (born Krishna Rai), 74, Indian Hindu guru and founder of the Siddha Yoga spiritual path

== October 3, 1982 (Sunday) ==
- With all National Football League games canceled because of a players' strike, CBS gave live coverage of NCAA Division III college football games. The NCAA temporarily waived its rule prohibiting college games on Sundays, CBS showed four games, so the network telecast the 16-14 win by Baldwin Wallace over Wittenberg University at Springfield, Ohio and West Georgia's 41-6 win over Millsaps College in Jackson, Mississippi. and NBC showed Canadian Football League games for the second Sunday in a row.
- The NBC science fiction television show Voyagers!, starring Jon-Erik Hexum and Meeno Peluce premiered at 8:00 in the evening as a time travel adventure.
- Died: Vivien Merchant (stage name for Ada Brand Thompson), 53, English stage and film actress, winner of the BAFTA TV Award for Best Actress in 1964, died from complications of alcoholism.

== October 4, 1982 (Monday) ==
- Four Canberra jet bombers of the Venezuelan Air Force, assisted by strafing by OV-10 Bronco observation aircraft, killed 23 people, ranging in age from 16 to 30. The primary casualties were killed with the bombing of a camp known to be housing rebel guerrillas of the Frente Américo Silva, the paramilitary division of the Marxist Bandera Roja. Before the bombing of the camp near the city of Cantaura in the Venezuelan state of Anzoátegui, a group of 1,500 Venezuelan soldiers encircled the camp to prevent anyone inside from escaping. At the time, the guerrilla leaders were meeting with a group of students sympathetic to their cause, and the casualties included civilians along with the guerrillas.
- In the U.S., the CBS television network became the first of the three existing broadcasters to televise an overnight news program (although the Cable News Network had been telecasting 24-hour news since 1980). The first program was CBS News Nightwatch, and the primary anchor was Christopher Glenn.
- Born: Ilhan Omar, Somali born-American politician and U.S. Representative for Minnesota since 2019; in Mogadishu
- Died:
  - Ahmed Hassan al-Bakr, 68, Iraqi military officer and politician, leading member of the revolutionary Arab Socialist Ba'ath Party and the Arab Socialist Ba'ath Party – Iraq Region, who served as both the prime minister and the president of Iraq from 1968 until 1979 after being brought to power by the 17 July Revolution,
  - The Amazing Criswell (stage name for Jeron Criswell King), 75, American self-proclaimed psychic, published writer, newspaper columnist, television showman, and part-time actor, known for wildly inaccurate predictions of global catastrophe scenarios and for advocating a social cycle theory of history repeating itself
  - Glenn Gould, 50, Canadian classical pianist, television producer, writer, broadcaster, and composer, was taken off life support with the consent of his father. Gould had been hospitalized since late September after having a stroke which had paralyzed the left side of his body, and further brain damage.
  - Leroy Grumman, 87, American aeronautical engineer, test pilot, and industrialist,
  - Stefanos Stefanopoulos, 84, prime minister of Greece from 1965 until 1966, during the political and constitutional crisis known as the Iouliana ("July events"),

== October 5, 1982 (Tuesday) ==
- In Bolivia, the national Congress met for the first time after two years of military rule, and elected Hernan Siles Zuazo as president. Siles, who had served as president from 1956 to 1960, had won the presidential election in 1980, but the Bolivian government was overthrown before he could take office. The vote by the Congress was 113 to 29.
- In Beijing, talks between the Peoples' Republic of China and the Soviet Union, to improve relations between the two Communist powers, resumed more than three years after China had invaded Vietnam in 1979. The Soviet team was led by Deputy Foreign Minister Leonid F. Ilyichev, and the Chinese side Deputy Foreign Minister Qian Qichen.

== October 6, 1982 (Wednesday) ==
- In conjunction with a concert to celebrate the 250th anniversary of the 1732 birth of Austrian classical composer Joseph Haydn, the Delme Quartet gave the premiere performance of Robert Simpson's String Quartet No. 9, a 57-minute piece, at Wigmore Hall in London.

== October 7, 1982 (Thursday) ==
- The People's Republic of China tested its first nuclear submarine-launched ballistic missile, the Julang-1 (JL-1), firing the unarmed rocket from the submarine Changzheng 6. While the first missile self-destructed after experiencing an attitude control failure, a subsequent test on October 12 was successful.
- Operation Muslim ibn Aqil, an offensive during the Iran–Iraq War that had been launched by 60,000 members of the Iranian Army and the Islamic Revolutionary Guard Corps against 36,000 Iraqi occupiers on October 1, ended after fighting in which Iran recaptured 58 square miles (150 km^{2}) of territory that had been lost to Iraq, but at the cost of 6,000 soldiers killed. The Iraqi forces lost 2,000 soldiers killed.
- The first of the British series of Adrian Mole young adult fiction, written by Sue Townsend, was released by Methuen Publishing with the publication of The Secret Diary of Adrian Mole, Aged 13¾.
- Born: Yundi Li, Chinese classical pianist; in Chongqing, Sichuan province

== October 8, 1982 (Friday) ==
- Poland banned the Solidarity trade union after having suspended it on December 13, 1981.
- After six years in opposition, Social Democrat Olof Palme returned to office as Prime Minister of Sweden.
- Died: Fernando Lamas, 67, Argentine-American actor and director of the Golden Age of Argentine cinema, died from pancreatic cancer.

== October 9, 1982 (Saturday) ==
- A terrorist attack on the Great Synagogue of Rome, with hand grenades and submachine guns, injured 37 civilians and killed a 2-year-old boy as Saturday services were ending five minutes before noon. Five well-dressed men stood outside the exit at the back of the synagogue and began the assault, then escaped in two separate cars. Although no group claimed responsibility, one of the assailants was identified as Osama Abdel al-Zomar, believed to be part of the Abu Nidal terrorist organization, and although al-Zomar would be arrested in Greece for smuggling explosives, he would be deported in 1989 to Libya.
- Near Calabasas, California, a brush fire in the destroyed the set that had been used since 1972 for filming outdoor scenes in the long-running TV series M*A*S*H, which was wrapping up production the series after 11 seasons. The fire would become part of the plot of the farewell episode of the series, shown on February 28, 1983, as the fictional 4077th Mobile Army Surgical Hospital was moved to a new location because of a fire caused by enemy incendiary bombs.
- Died:Anna Freud, 86, British psychoanalyst, considered the co-founder of psychoanalytic child psychology.

== October 10, 1982 (Sunday) ==
- The television documentary program Nature, originally hosted by Donald Johanson with narration of the film clips by George Page, was introduced by the Public Broadcasting System (PBS) in the United States. One of the most popular programs of PBS, Nature would begin its 45th season in 2026.
- Democracy was restored to the South American nation of Bolivia, with General Guido Vildoso yielding the office to former president Hernán Siles Zuazo, who had been elected to the office by the Bolivian National Congress.
- In Guatemala, at the Petén province, rebel guerrillas of the Fuerzas Armadas Rebeldes (FAR) ambushed a Guatemalan Army convoy near the village of Palestina, 18 miles (29 km) from the village of Las Dos Erres and the city of La Libertad, killing 22 soldiers. Less than two months later, the Guatemalan Army would retaliate with the massacre of more than 200 people in Dos Erres.
- Saint Maximilian Kolbe (1894-1941) was canonized by Pope John Paul II, 41 years after being martyred in the Auschwitz concentration camp. Kolbe is venerated by the Roman Catholic Church as the patron saint of amateur radio operators, drug addicts and prisoners.

== October 11, 1982 (Monday) ==
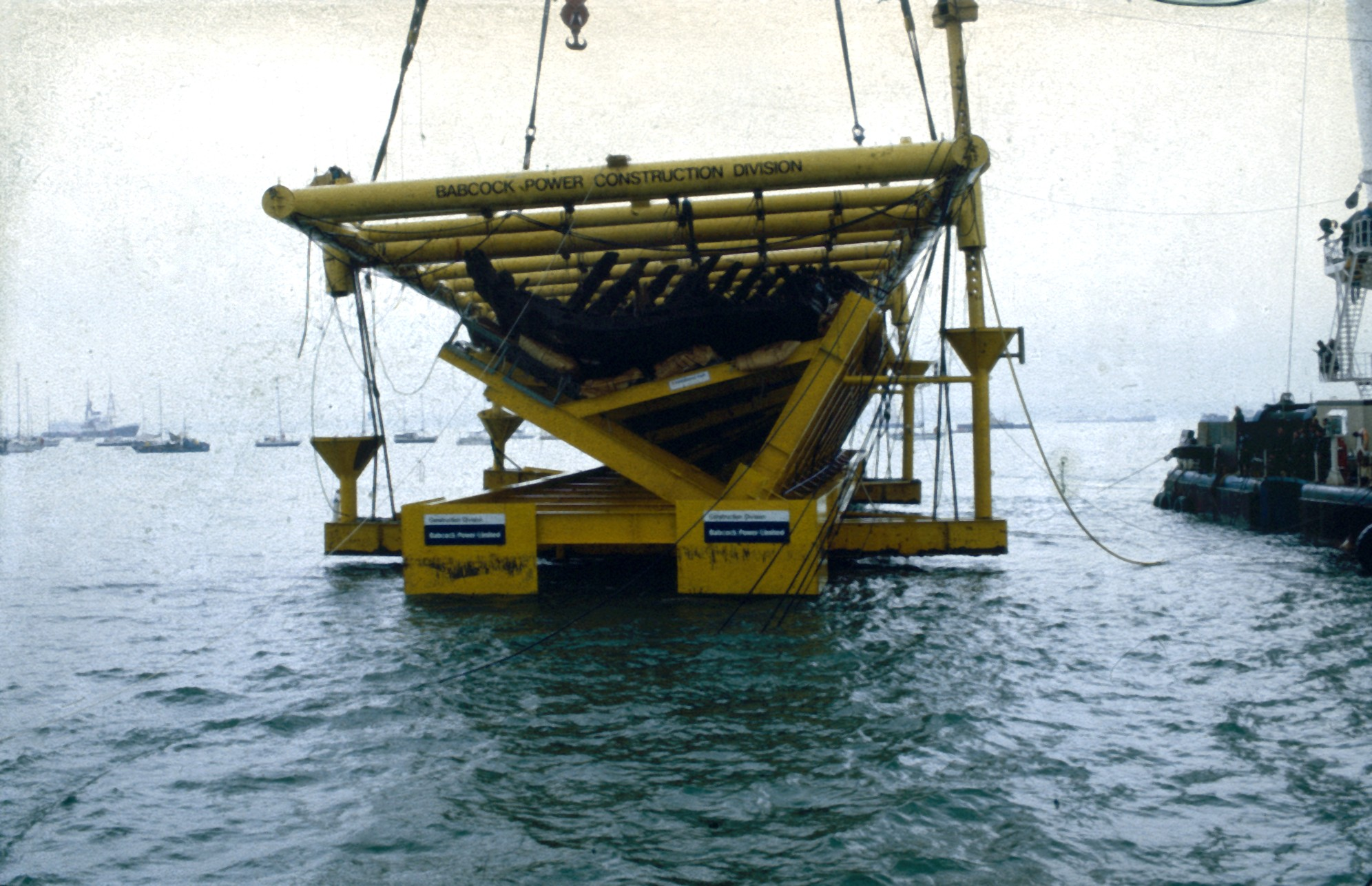
Mary Rose being raised from The Solent, October 11, 1982

- The Mary Rose, flagship of King Henry VIII of England, was raised from The Solent, the strait separating Great Britain from the Isle of Wight, more than 430 years after it sank. On July 19, 1545, Mary Rose led her last mission, an attack on an invasion fleet from the Kingdom of France, but capsized during the battle off of the coast of Spithead, with the deaths of at least 365 of her crew of 400. The wreckage, which had been charted as recently as 1841 but not explored, was identified as Mary Rose on May 5, 1971, and the excavation procedure began in 1974.

== October 12, 1982 (Tuesday) ==
- The first three spacecraft of the Soviet Union's GLONASS satellite navigation system, Kosmos 1413, Kosmos 1414 and Kosmos 1415, were launched from the Baikonur Cosmodrome in the Kazakh SSR.
- After a failed launch on October 7, the People's Republic of China successfully tested its first submarine launched nuclear missile, with the unarmed JL-1 rocket launched from its sub Changzheng 6.
- The cargo ship Elhawi Star, registered in Saudi Arabia, was sunk by its own cargo— 3,631 tonnes 3,631,000 kilograms (8,005,000 lb) of ceramic tiles and 781 tonnes 781,000 kilograms (1,722,000 lb) of lumber — as it was being towed out of the Port of Rijeka in Yugoslavia to begin its travel to the Italian port of Chioggia. Because of the uneven distribution of its cargo in the loading process, the Elhawi Star listed as it was being towed out of harbor by the Yugoslavian tugboats Beli Kamik and Aries. None of its crew of 30 were injured.
- The UK capital of London held its first victory parade since 1947, as a celebration of its triumph over Argentina in the Falklands War. An estimated crowd of 300,000 people lined the mile-long route to watch the profession. Approximately 300,000 people lined the mile-long route of the parade.
- The Union of Ibero-American Capital Cities, with representation for 25 national capitals where Spanish or Portuguese are the official language, was founded in Madrid. The UCCI has capital of three nations in Europe (Spain, Portugal and Andorra), 14 in South America (Bolivia and Brazil have two capitals represented), five in Central America and three in the Caribbean (including the U.S. Commonwealth of Puerto Rico).
- Born: Romain Desgranges, French professional rock climber and 2017 world champion; in Sainte-Colombe, Hautes-Alpes département
- Died: Howard Sackler, 52, American screenwriter, playwright and Pulitzer Prize winner who was best known for the play The Great White Hope and its film adaptation, was found dead in his studio in the city of Ibiza in Spain. The cause of his death was not disclosed. Sackler also provided an uncredited rewrite for the script of the film Jaws (1975) and he was a main screenwriter for the sequel, Jaws 2,

== October 13, 1982 (Wednesday) ==
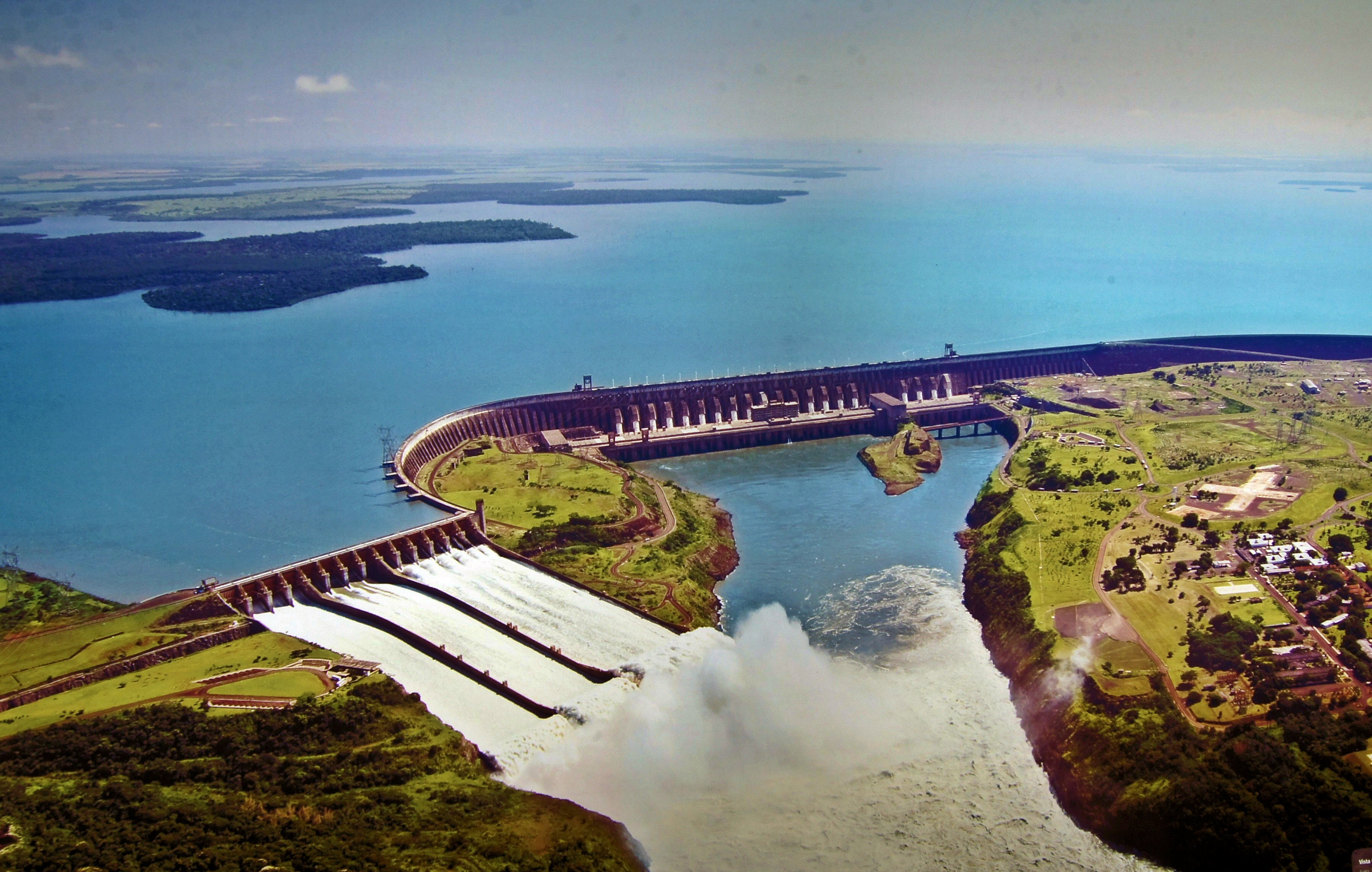
The Itaipu Dam and Itaipu Lake

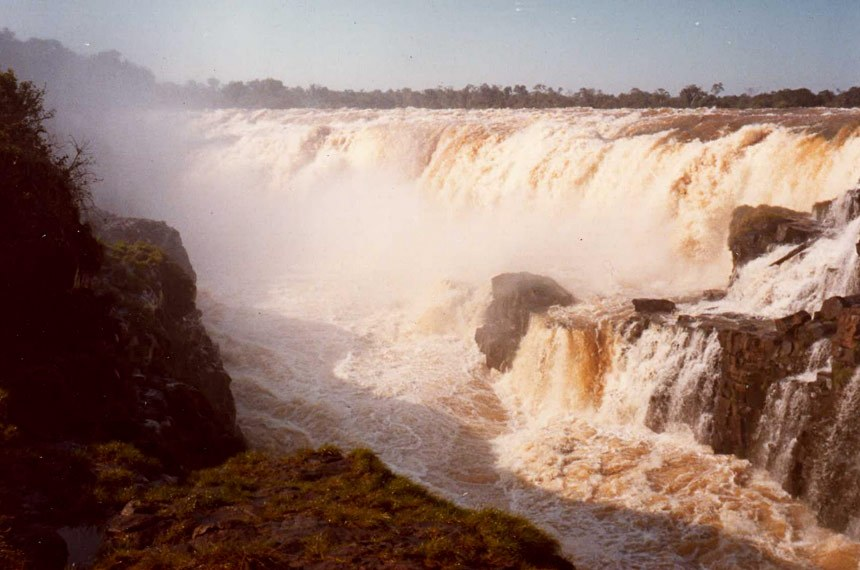
The former Guaíra Falls, submerged by the dam

- On the border of Brazil and Paraguay, the Itaipu Dam of the Paraná River was concluded, the gates to its side canal were closed, and the creation of Itaipu Lake began. Over 14 days, concluding on October 27, areas of Brazil, Paraguay and Argentina that had once been occupied by villages and an estimated 10,000 families, were inundated. The Guaíra Falls, until 1982 one of the largest waterfalls in the world, disappeared permanently under the 520 square miles (1,300 km^{2}) lake.
- The British punk rock group, The Clash, performed at Shea Stadium in New York City that would not be heard again until 26 years later. The recording of the band, which appeared as the opener for the main attraction, The Who, would be rediscovered years later and released as the album Live at Shea Stadium on October 8, 2008.

== October 14, 1982 (Thursday) ==
- U.S. President Reagan announced the formation of the Organized Crime Drug Enforcement Task Force (OCDETF) within the U.S. Department of Justice. The OCDETF would be closed in 2025 by orders of U.S. President Trump as part of a cost-cutting measure.
- In Toronto, the explosion of a bomb planted by the Canadian domestic terrorist group "Direct Action" injured 11 people, including three employees of Litton Industries. The bomb exploded at 11:31 pmafter the five-member "urban guerrilla" group had targeted the building because of its manufacture of components for American cruise missiles. One of the members, Juliet Caroline Belmas, called the security desk at Litton at 11:20 to warn that a dynamite bomb had been placed in a van outside the business and told the person on duty that a truck with 1,210 pounds (550 kg) of dynamite would detonate "in 15 to 20 minutes" and that the plant and surrounding area should be evacuated. Eleven minutes later, the bomb exploded, knocking out a wall and hurting five employees, three members of the Toronto Police bomb squad, and three passersby.

== October 15, 1982 (Friday) ==
- The Burmese nationality law took effect, directing that the only persons who could be considered citizens of Burma (now Myanmar) had to belong to the "indigenous race" of Burmese people, or have a grandparent who had been part of the indigenous race, or was a child of Burmese citiznes, or whose ancestors lived in British Burma in 1942 or earlier. Generally, the Muslims in the predominantly Buddhist republic were excluded from citizenship.
- The Garn–St. Germain Depository Institutions Act was signed into law by U.S. President Reagan, deregulating savings and loan associations and allowing "S&Ls" and banks to provide adjustable-rate mortgages, prior to the savings and loan crisis that would follow and see the failure of hundreds of S&Ls during the 1980s.

== October 16, 1982 (Saturday) ==
- The Giro di Lombardia bicycle race was held in Italy and was won by Giuseppe Saronni.
- Astronomers David C. Jewitt and G. Edward Danielson, using the Hale Telescope and Mount Palomar Observatory in the U.S., made the first sighting of Halley's Comet since its last approach to Earth in 1910.
- Born: Prithviraj Sukumaran, Indian film actor and director in Malayalam cinema; in Thiruvananthapuram, Kerala state.

== October 17, 1982 (Sunday) ==
- As the National Football League strike continued, the NFL Players Association (NFLPA) played the first of two games in what cable television magnate and Atlanta Braves owner Ted Turner as a six-team (one for each of the six divisions of the NFL) professional football league. In the game, played in front of 8,760 spectators in the 56,000-seat RFK Stadium, home of the NFL's Washington Redskins, with "National East" defeating "American East", 23 to 22. National East had 14 of the Redskins on its 41-man team, while Buffalo Bills players represented more than any other AFC team in the NFL.

== October 18, 1982 (Monday) ==
- The Coastal Barrier Resources Act (CBRA) was signed into law by U.S. President Ronald Reagan, with the objectives of discouraging development in high risk areas vulnerable to storm surges and hurricane winds, reducing wasteful government spending, and protecting the natural resources of undeveloped coastal barriers.
- The United States formally ratified the Physical Protection of Nuclear Material International Agreement, amending the 1978 Nuclear Non-Proliferation Act of 1978.
- Alcestis Barcinonensis (Alcestis of Barcelona), a 124-line epic poem written in the second half of the 4th century by an unknown author, was published for the first time after the translation of the four pages written on papyrus. Ramon Roca-Puig of the Fundación Sant Lluc Evangelista had overseen the process of deciphering and interpretation by six experts from universities in West Germany, Britain, the U.S. and Italy.
- Born: Julia Ioffe, Russian-born American journalist and media entrepreneur; in Moscow.
- Died:
  - Bess Truman, 97, First Lady of the United States from 1945 until 1953 as the wife of U.S. President Harry S. Truman,
  - Pierre Mendès France, 75, Prime Minister of France for eight months in 1954 and 1955
  - John Robarts, 65, Canadian politician who was premier of the province of Ontario from 1961 to 1971, committed suicide after having had a series of strokes, and depression from the 1977 suicide of his son.
  - Nellie Mae Rowe, 82, African-American folk artist

== October 19, 1982 (Tuesday) ==
- American automotive engineer John DeLorean was arrested at a hotel near the Los Angeles International Airport, and charged with trafficking cocaine., although he would be acquitted of the charges in 1984.
- Elections were held for five of the 10 non-permanent members of the United Nations Security Council, with seventeen nations vying for the position, with candidates to represent four continental groups. Out of the seven finalists, Zimbabwe, Malta and the Netherlands replaced Uganda, Ireland and Spain, respectively. Nicaragua defeated the Dominican Republic in replacing Panama, while Malta rather than New Zealand replacing Spain.
- Iceland's police tactical and special weapons team, the Viking Squad, was founded by the Icelandic Police.
- Born: Atom Araullo (stage name for Alfonso Pagauan), Philippine broadcast journalist and anchor for the GTV news program State of the Nation; in Quezon City
- Died:
  - Schubert R. Dyche, 89, American college basketball coach whose team, the 1928–29 Montana State University Bobcats, was retroactively declared national champion for the 1928–29 men's basketball season by the Helms Athletic Foundation.
  - Paul America (stage name for Paul Johnson), 38, American film actor, was killed when he was struck by a car in Ormond Beach, Florida.

== October 20, 1982 (Wednesday) ==
- A riot and panic killed 66 people in Moscow during the UEFA Cup match between FC Spartak Moscow and HFC Haarlem, which Spartak won, 3 to 0, before 15,000 spectators at the Olympic stadium. The government-regulated Soviet press did not report the disaster, although a spokesman for the Skilfosovski Hospital in Moscow said that "some of the victims were treated there after the match", but did not give further details. The Soviet press did not report the disaster, and the government would not reveal the details until 1989.
- Presidential elections were held for the first time in Sri Lanka, and incumbent President J.R. Jayewardene was re-elected to a six-year term with almost 53% of the vote. Finishing second among five other candidates was former Agriculture Minister Hector Kobbekaduwa.
- At Busch Stadium in St. Louis, the St. Louis Cardinals won the championship of Major League Baseball, defeating the Milwaukee Brewers, 6 to 3, in Game 7 of the best-4-of-7 World Series. Milwaukee, at the time a member of the American League, had taken a three games to two lead on October 17 before the Cardinals had forced a seventh game by winning Game 6 by a score of 13 to 1. In Game 7, Milwaukee never had the lead, though it tied the score 1 to 1 in the fifth.

== October 21, 1982 (Thursday) ==
- Hissen Habre was sworn in as President of Chad, four months after his rebel guerrillas took control of the capital, N'Djamena. In his inaugural address, President Hibre asked the nation's citizens to bring an end to the civil war that had gone on since 1965.
- Barbara Hogan, a white citizen of South Africa and a member of the outlawed black independence group, the African National Congress (ANC), was sentenced to 10 years in prison after being convicted of high treason. The prosecution had persuaded the court that simply being a member the ANC was "participation in a conspiracy to overthrow the white-minority South African government by violent means".

== October 22, 1982 (Friday) ==
- In the first parliamentary elections in 17 years in the African nation of Burundi, voters were allowed to choose between candidates for the 52 elected seats of the 65-member Inama nshingamateka, also called the Assemblée Nationale. Although all candidates were members of Burundi's sole political party, the Union for National Progress (UPRONA), the party had two candidates for each electoral district. The other 13 members were appointed by Burundi's President Jean-Baptiste Bagaza.
- The settlement of claims arising from the expulsion of the Chagossians, the removal by Britain of the entire population of the Chagos Archipelago (located in the Indian Ocean) and their relocation to Mauritius between 1967 and 1973, was paid out after having been agreed upon on July 7. The British government paid four million pounds sterling (£4,000,000 equivalent to $6,750,000 U.S. dollars at the exchange rate at the time), to be divided among 1,150 people who qualified for payment.
- Public Law 97-359, providing for Amerasian persons to become United States citizens, was signed into law by U.S. President Reagan as an amendment to the Immigration and Nationality Act of 1965, after being passed by both houses of Congress. The term, coined by novelist Pearl S. Buck, was defined by the law as "an alien who was born in Korea, Kampuchea, Laos, Thailand or Vietnam after December 31, 1950 and before October 22, 1982 and was fathered by a U.S. citizen."
- The film First Blood, the first of the "Rambo" series of action films starring Sylvester Stallone, premiered in the United States, and would earn USD $160 million worldwide, more than seven times its budget of $15 million.
- Died:Savitri Devi, 77, French-born Greek Nazi and animal rights activist, spy, and author, Devi was a proponent of a synthesis of Hinduism and Nazism, and had proclaimed that German dictator Adolf Hitler was an avatar of the Hindu god Vishnu,

== October 23, 1982 (Saturday) ==
- A confrontation between law enforcement officials and members of a church led to the deaths of four people and injuries to seven others in the small town of Miracle Valley, Arizona. Cochise County sheriff's deputies and Arizona state police attempted to arrest two members of the Christ Miracle Healing Center and Church. What began with the arrival of two deputies at the church compound became a fight between 37 law enforcement officers against an estimated 150 church members, some of whom had guns. In 15 minutes, two church members were killed at the scene and a deputy sheriff was fatally injured after being struck by an iron pipe, while two church members and five officers were injured.

== October 24, 1982 (Sunday) ==
- A supernova that had occurred 60 million years earlier in the galaxy NGC 1187, was observed for the first time from Earth by Chilean astronomers André Müller and Oscar Pizarro at the European Southern Observatory (ESO) in on the La Silla mountain near La Higuera, Chile.
- The Norgesmesterskapet, the championship playoff of Norway's premier professional soccer football league, the Norges Fotballforbund, was won by SK Brann, which defeated Molde FK, 3 to 2, before a crowd of 24,000 people at Oslo's Ullevaal Stadion.
- One of the least successful Broadway theatre productions of 1982, the musical Rock 'N Roll! The First 5,000 Years, had its premiere at the St. James Theatre, but would close one week later, on October 31, after only nine performances.

== October 25, 1982 (Monday) ==
- Belisario Betancur, who had been inaugurated as President of Colombia on August 7, announced that his nation would not be hosting the 1986 FIFA World Cup, after having been awarded hosting rights on June 9, 1974. In the announcement, Betancur said "As we preserve the public good, as we know that waste is inexcusable, I announce to my compatriots that the 1986 World Cup will not be held in Colombia. After democratic consultation on what our real needs are, the golden rule that the World Cup should serve Colombia and not Colombia the World Cup multinational was not complied with. Here we have many other things to do and there is not even time to attend to the extravagances of FIFA and its partners."

== October 26, 1982 (Tuesday) ==
- American serial killer David Bullock entered a guilty plea on charges of murdering at least six people over a 30-day period from December 5, 1981 to January 4, 1982. At a court hearing in New York City, Bullock told the judge that his motive had been that "I was in the Christmas spirit. It made me happy."

== October 27, 1982 (Wednesday) ==
- Iraq began the use of rocket bombing in the ongoing Iran–Iraq War, firing Soviet-made Scud-B missiles at the Iranian city of Dezful, killing 21 civilians and wounding at least 100 others with conventionally-armed "Frog 7" rockets.
- The People's Republic of China released the results of its census of July 1, 1982 as the Chinese Communist Party newspaper People's Daily reported that the China had become the first nation in the world to have more than one billion people, with a population of 1,008,180,738.
- The name of Canada's chief national holiday was changed from Dominion Day to Canada Day, with the celebration of the 1867 creation of the Canadian Confederation to be under a new name on July 1, 1983. Queen Elizabeth II, in her capacity as Queen of Canada, gave royal assent to the bill approved by the Canadian House of Commons and the Canadian Senate. On March 29, the legal name of "Dominion of Canada" had been dropped by the approval of the Canada Act 1982.
- Died:Miguel Ydígoras Fuentes, 87, Guatemalan military officer who served as the President of Guatemala from 1958 until 1963, when he was deposed by in a coup d'état, In 1961, Ydígoras had allowed the CIA to train the Cuban exile force that was used in the failed Bay of Pigs Invasion,

== October 28, 1982 (Thursday) ==
- Elections were held for all 350 seats of Spain's Congreso de los Diputados, the lower house of the Cortes Generales parliament, and for 208 of the 254 seats in the upper house, the Senado. The Spanish Socialist Workers' Party (Partido Socialista Obrero Español or PSOE) , led by Felipe González, won 202 seats in the Congreso and 134 seats in the Senado, for a majority in both houses.

== October 29, 1982 (Friday) ==
- Lindy Chamberlain was wrongfully convicted in Australia of murder in the death in 1980 of her infant daughter, Azaria Chamberlain, during a camping trip at the Ayers Rock park in the Northern Territory. She was sentenced to life imprisonment without parole, at the maximum security Berrimah Prison. In 1986, new evidence would be found to confirm Mrs. Chamberlain's claim that a dingo had killed her daughter, and she was released from imprisonment pending a new investigation. She and her husband (who had been convicted of being an accessory and given a suspended sentence) would be pardoned in 1987 after their acquittal on retrial, and she would be paid AUD $1,300,000 in compensation for wrongful imprisonment.
- Born:Ahmed al-Sharaa, Saudi-born President of Syria since 2025, and previously leader of the rebel Syrian Salvation Government from 2017 to 2024; in Riyadh, Saudi Arabia

== October 30, 1982 (Saturday) ==
- The Titan 34D rocket, designed by the United States for placing military satellites into Earth orbit, made its first flight. It was launched from Space Launch Complex 40 at Cape Canaveral, carrying a payload of two satellites for the third version of the Defense Satellite Communications System (DSCS III)
- U.S. actress Dominique Dunne, whose career was rising, with six appearances on television and one in the hit film Poltergeist in 1982 at 22 years old, was fatally strangled in the driveway of her home in West Hollywood. Her ex-boyfriend John Thomas Sweeney, the secondary chef at the famous Ma Maison restaurant in Los Angeles, would be convicted of her murder. Dunne died on November 4, after five days in a coma. Sweeney would be paroled after less than three years in a medium-security prison, and be hired as the head chef at another upscale restaurant.
- The Seibu Lions of Saitma defeated the Chunichi Dragons of Nagoya, 9 to 4, to win the Japan Series, championship of Japanese professional baseball, four games to two.

== October 31, 1982 (Sunday) ==
- The 1982 World's Fair, held in Knoxville, Tennessee, closed permanently after having opened six months earlier on May 1.
- The last UAC TurboTrain, a high-speed train powered by a gas turbine engine, made its final trip after having been introduced by United Aircraft Corporation in 1968.
- Died:Dick Merrill, 88, American aviation pioneer, who completed a round-trip transatlantic flight in 1936, reaching his initial destination in London after 18 hours and 36 minutes, the fastest Atlantic crossing up to that time.,
