= Huntington Center =

Huntington Center may refer to a location in the United States:

- Huntington Center, a shopping center in Huntington Beach, California, now known as Bella Terra
- Huntington Center (Columbus, Ohio), an office building complex in Columbus, Ohio
- Huntington Center (Toledo, Ohio), formerly known as the Lucas County Arena, an indoor sports arena in Toledo, Ohio
- Huntington Center, Vermont, a village in the town of Huntington
- Huntington Convention Center of Cleveland, a convention center in Cleveland, Ohio
