= Remington–Williamson Farm =

- U.S. National Register of Historic Places
- U.S. Historic district
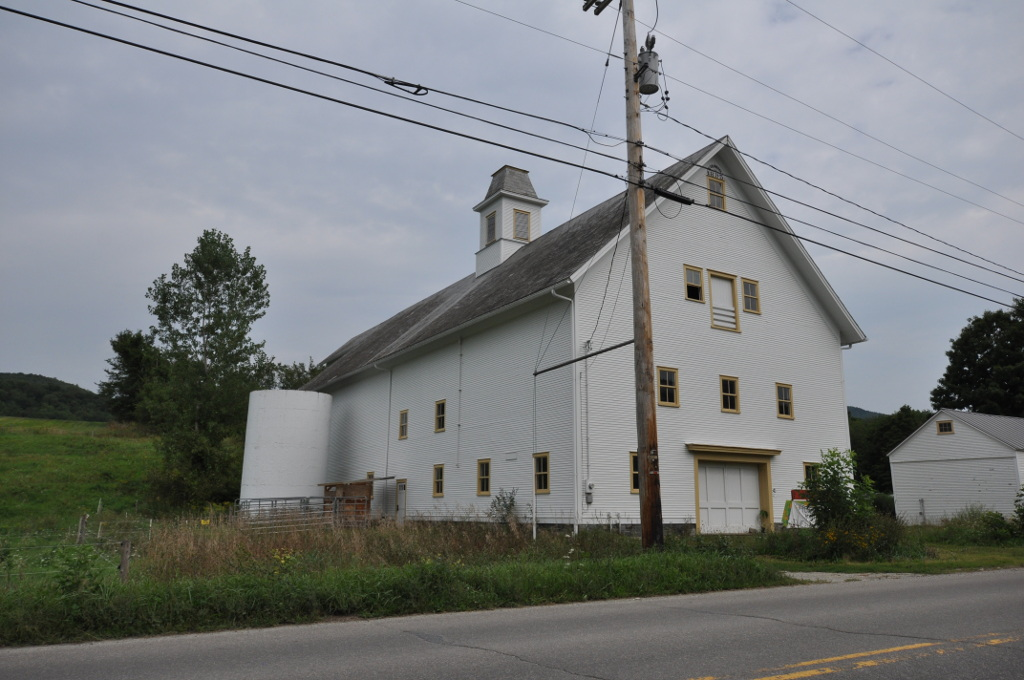

- Location within Vermont Location within the United States
- Location: 4582 Main Rd., Huntington, Vermont
- Coordinates: 44.29974°N 72.96948°W
- Area: 30.2 acres (12.2 ha)
- Built: 1830
- Architectural style: Federal, Bank barn
- MPS: Agricultural Resources of Vermont MPS
- NRHP reference No.: 01001239
- Added to NRHP: November 19, 2001

The Remington–Williamson Farm is a historic farm property at 4582 Main Road in Huntington, Vermont. The farm was established in 1830 by Jeremiah Remington, and was in the hands of his descendants into the 1980s. The current 30 acres (12 ha) include Remington's original 1830 brick farmhouse, and a well-preserved 1895 bank barn. The farm was listed on the National Register of Historic Places in 2001.

== Description and history ==
The Remington–Williamson Farm stands about 0.5 miles (0.80 km) north of Huntington's village center, and is roughly bisected by Main Road, the principal road leading north from the village. It is bounded on the west by the Huntington River, a tributary of the Winooski River, and on the south by Brush Brook, which enters the river at the farm's southernmost corner. The farmstead consists of a 2 1/2-story Federal style brick house, set on the west side of the road, a large bank barn, and a smaller c. 1840 barn, both of the latter across the road from the house. The bank barn is three stories in height, with ground level or ramp access to all three levels, and is capped by a cupola. It has been little altered, with some modern foundation footings of concrete, and a new opening cut into the third level in the 1980s.

The farm had already been cleared when Jeremiah Remington acquired it in 1830; it was then known as the "Old William Hill" farm. It is unclear whether Remington worked the farm himself, or leased it to someone else. He bequested the property to his children, and it remained in the hands of his descendants until the 1980s. Its size grew over time from about 70 acres to more than 200, and was subdivided by a developer in the 1980s, retaining conservation restrictions on the large parcels made. As of 1995, the property is being used as a diversified organic farm.

== See also ==
- National Register of Historic Places listings in Chittenden County, Vermont
