= November 1982 =

Month of 1982

<<	November 1982					>>
Su	Mo	Tu	We	Th	Fr	Sa
	1	2	3	4	5	6
7	8	9	10	11	12	13
14	15	16	17	18	19	20
21	22	23	24	25	26	27
28	29	30

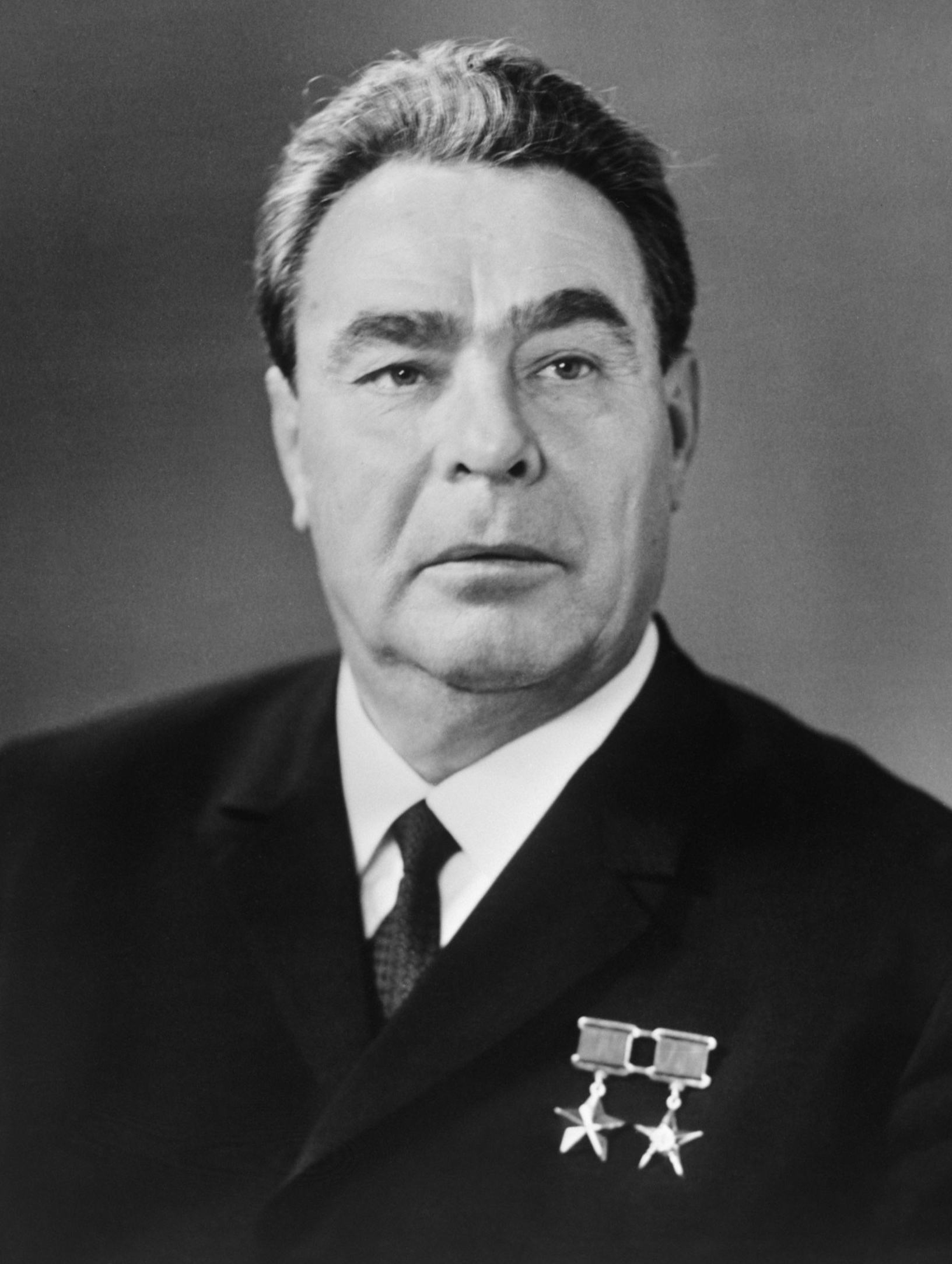
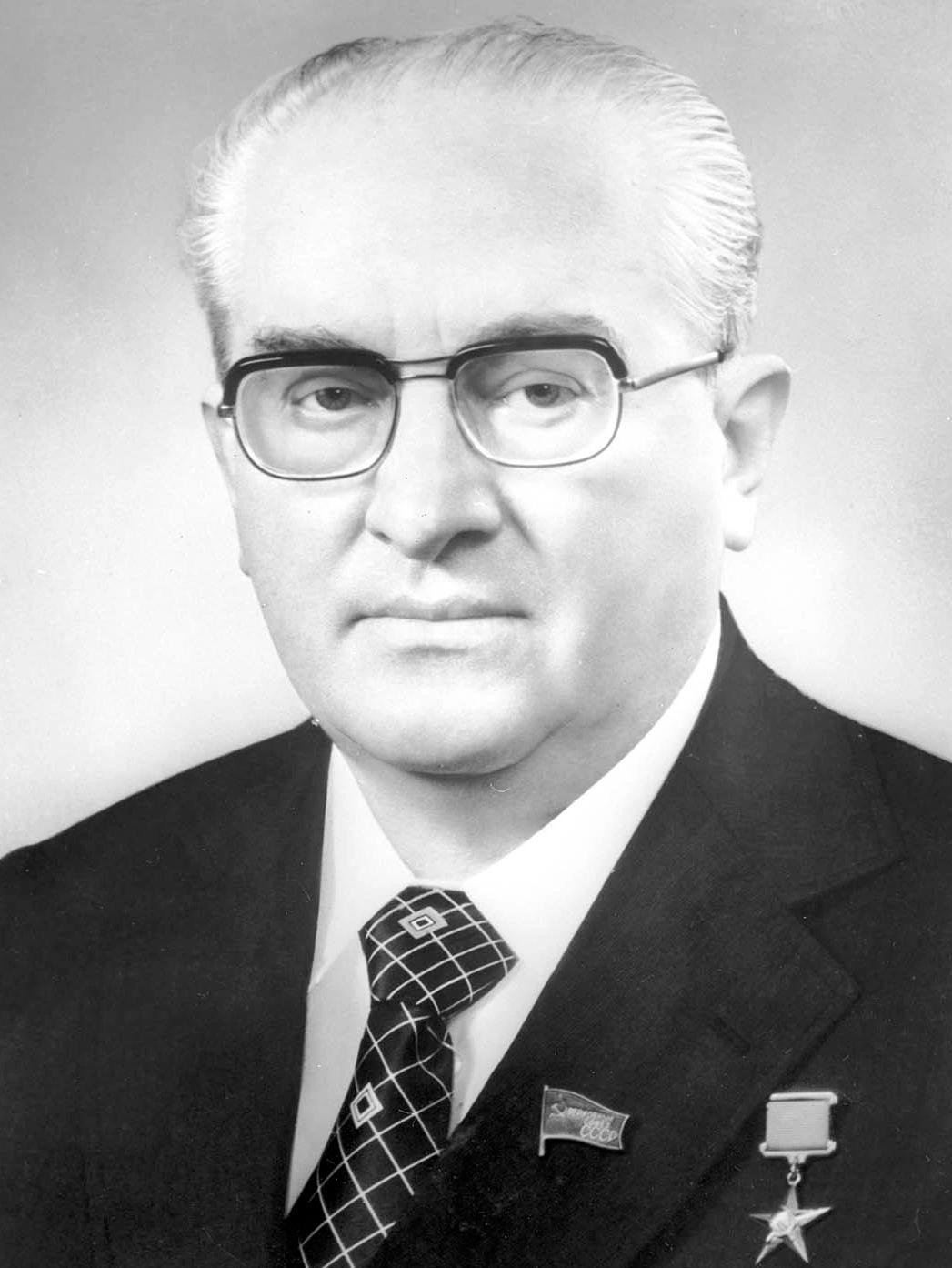
Soviet leader Leonid Brezhnev dies, former KGB director Yuri Andropov becomes the new leader of the USSR

The following events occurred in November 1982:

== November 1, 1982 (Monday) ==
- As the Iran–Iraq War continued, Iran launched Operation Muharram at 10:08 p.m. local time in an attempt to recapture parts of the mountainous Ilam province that had been lost to Iraq. Over the next five days, 4,000 Iranians and 3,000 Iraqis were killed, but the offensive made only small gains.
- On the campus of the Trinity University College at Carmarthen in Wales, the British government launched S4C, the first television channel directed exclusively to speakers of the Welsh language
- The downfall of United American Bank, which would be shut down three months later on February 14, 1983 in the fourth-largest bank failure in U.S. history up to that time, began as a U.S. government team of 180 bank regulators from the Federal Deposit Insurance Corporation simultaneously raided all 29 branches and offices of the UAB on a search warrant arising from suspicions of fraud being committed by the two brothers who controlled the largest share of banking in Knoxville, Tennessee, the Jake Butcher and C. H. Butcher Jr. The seizure took place the day after the closing of the 1982 World's Fair in Knoxville, an event which had been primariy sponsored by the Butcher brothers.
- Died:
  - King Vidor, 88, American film producer, director and screen writer best known for the silent film The Big Parade (1925) and for the sound film Duel in the Sun (1946)
  - James Broderick, 55, American TV and film actor, died from thyroid cancer.

== November 2, 1982 (Tuesday) ==
The original Channel 4 logo

- Great Britain launched Channel 4, its fourth television network, joining BBC1, BBC2 and ITV, at 4:30 in the afternoon. Paul Coia opened regular broadcasting, telling viewers "Good afternoon. It's a pleasure to be able to say to you, welcome to Channel 4." Over the next 15 minutes, a montage of clips from its upcoming programming was shown, after which the game show Countdown began at 4:45.
- Midterm elections were held in the United States for all 435 seats of the U.S. House of Representatives and 33 of the 100 seats of the U.S. Senate, as well as for the governors of 36 of the 50 states. In the House, the Democratic Party increased its lead over the Republican Party from 243-191 to 269-165, while the Republicans maintained their 54 to 46 majority over the Democrats.
- The city of Keizer, Oregon, now the 14th most populous municipality in the U.S. state of Oregon, was incorporated by voters in Marion County, after the council Salem, the state capital, had discussed plans to annex the area.
- Born: Kyoko Fukada, Japanese film actress known for Kamikaze Girls; in Kita, Tokyo
- Died: Lester Roloff, 68, American fundamentalist Baptist preacher and radio evangelist who founded the Rebekah Home for Girls, chain of homes for homeless teenagers, was killed in a plane crash along with four other people, during a storm that brought the aircraft down outside of Normangee, Texas.

== November 3, 1982 (Wednesday) ==
- A fire and carbon monoxide inside the 1.66 miles (2.67 km) long Salang Tunnel in Afghanistan killed as many as 2,700 Soviet soldiers and Afghan civilians according to early reports. The Soviet government, which was in the third year of its 1979 invasion of Afghanistan conceded the deaths of no more than 64 soldiers and 112 civilians. The first Western reports put the estimate at several hundred people. The fire began when the lead vehicle in a Soviet Army convoy collided with a fuel truck, causing the gasoline fire and toxic smoke. An alphabetical list, written in 1994 after the breakup of the Soviet Union, gives the names of 1,424 Red Army soldiers as part of a "Book of Remembrance of Soviet Soldiers Who Died in Afghanistan".
- In the U.S., the Dow Jones Industrial Average, indicative of the performance of the major companies listed on the New York Stock Exchange closed above 1,000 points for its first all-time high in more than 9 years, ending the day at 1,065.49 after surging by 4.25 percent or 43.41 points.
- Randy Smith of the San Diego Clippers set a new National Basketball Association record by playing in his 845th consecutive regular season game, a 130 to 111 loss to the Philadelphia 76ers. Smith had not missed a game since February 15, 1972, and would extend the streak to 906 appearances in a row, ending the streak after his last game with San Diego on March 13, 1983.
- Born:
  - Pekka Rinne, Finnish professional ice hockey goaltender and 2017-18 Vezina Trophy winner; in Kempele
  - Evgeni Plushenko, Russian figure skater and 2006 Olympic gold medalist; in Dzhamku, Russian SFSR, Soviet Union
- Died:
  - Dr. Alan Parks, 61, British physician, president of the Royal College of Surgeons and pioneer of colorectal surgery, known for his 1976 development of the ileal pouch–anal anastomosis (also called the restorative proctocolectomy), died during emergency cardiac surgery after having a heart attack in his office as president.
  - Bob Paulson, 40, British member of the England national speedway team, committed suicide by carbon monoxide poisioning.

== November 4, 1982 (Thursday) ==
- Ireland's Taoiseach (prime minister) Charles Haughey lost on motion on confidence that he had brought before the members of the Dáil, failing by two votes, with 82 against and only 80 for, and bringing down his government. A new election was set for November 24.
- Ruud Lubbers took office as the new Prime Minister of the Netherlands, after his colleague in the Christen-Democratisch Appèl party, Dries van Agt, announced his resignation from office.
- Born:
  - Kamila Skolimowska, Polish track and field athlete and 2000 Olympic gold medalist for the women's hammer throw; in Warsaw (died from a pulmonary embolism, 2009)
  - Chu Pak Hong, Hong Kong film actor; in Sha Tin, Hong Kong
- Died: Dominique Dunne, 22, American television and film actress who had recently appeared in the hit film Poltergeist, died five days after she was strangled by her ex-boyfriend, John Thomas Sweeney.She had never regained consciousness after her attack and was taken off of life support with the consent of her father.

== November 5, 1982 (Friday) ==
- FIFA, the worldwide governing body of soccer football, approved the cancellation of plans to host the 1986 FIFA World Cup in the South American nation of Colombia, after the nation's new president, Belisario Betancur, had made his intentions known on October 25. FIFA announced that other Western Hemisphere nations could make their bids, with the site to be awarded on May 20, 1983. Mexico, which had hosted the World Cup in 1970, would be unanimously selected as the site of the 1986 tournament.
- The new classical composition Shadows (Opus 82), written by Finnish composer Aulis Sallinen, was performed for the first time. The premiere took place at the Kennedy Center in Washington, D.C., as part of a concert by the U.S. National Symphony Orchestra, and was conducted by Mstislav Rostropovich.
- Died:
  - Jacques Tati (stage name for Jacques Tatischeff), 75, French mime and actor known for his character "Monsieur Hulot" in five films from 1953 to 1971
  - Shabab Kiranvi (stage name for Nazir Ahmed), 57, Pakistani film director and producer
  - Theresa Hak Kyung Cha, 31, South Korean-born American novelist, was murdered one week after the publication of her novel Dictée, while attempting to meet her husband Richard Barnes at the Puck Building in New York City. A security guard at the building, Joey Sanza, raped and strangled Cha when she entered the building.

== November 6, 1982 (Saturday) ==
- Prime Minister Paul Biya was sworn in as the second President of Cameroon, two days after Ahmadou Ahidjo had made the surprise announcement of his resignation after 22 years in office."Premier Is Installed As Cameroon President". Reuters. November 7, 1982. p. 5.

== November 7, 1982 (Sunday) ==
- The government of the Republic of Upper Volta (now Burkina Faso), led by Saye Zerbo, was overthrown in a coup d'état led by Colonel Gabriel Somé Yorian, who installed Dr. Jean-Baptiste Ouédraogo two days later as president of the West African nation. On November 21, Ouédraogo announced that the ruling military junta, the Conseil de Salut du Peuple ("Council of the Salvation of the People") would install a civilian regime within two years.
- Voters in Turkey overwhelmingly approved a new constitution and endorsed the rule of General Kenan Evren, who had led a 1980 military coup to overthrow the government. Evren formally took office as President of Turkey two days later, on November 9, for a seven-year term.
- Voters in the Malagasy Republic, encompassing the entire island of Madagascar, elected incumbent President Didier Ratsiraka, who had more than four times as many votes as his opponent, Monja Jaona, in the first multi-candidate presidential election in the African nation since 1965.
- On the 65th anniversary of the October Revolution that installed Communist rule in Russia and created the Soviet Union, the 115 feet (35 m) tall Peoples' Friendship Arch was unveiled in Kyiv, capital of the Ukrainian SSR during celebrations of the 1,500th anniversary of the 582 AD founding of Kyiv. The Arch was a commemoration of the "Union of Russia and Ukraine" by the Pereiaslav Agreement on January 18, 1654. After the independence of Ukraine and its separation from the Soviet Union on August 24, 1991, the People's Friendship Arch would be renamed the Arch of Freedom of the Ukrainian People in 2022. Initially scheduled to be dismantled by 2024, the Arch was repurposed after taking it down proved to be more expensive than funds would allow.
- Soviet leader Leonid Brezhnev made his final public appearance, standing with other Soviet Communist Party officials on the balcony of Lenin's Tomb for two hours during in freezing temperatures to review the military parade commemorating the 65th anniversary of the October Revolution of November 7, 1917. Afterward, he delivered a speech at the Kremlin, proclaiming the USSR's "sincere striving for equitable and fruitful cooperation with all who want such cooperation", and declaring his belief that "exactly such a way will lead mankind to peace for the living and future generations." Brezhnev died from a heart attack three days later.

== November 8, 1982 (Monday) ==
- At approximately 9:20 in the evening, a meteorite weighing 6 pounds (2.7 kg) crashed through the roof of a home on Church Street in Wethersfield, Connecticut, then through the second and first floor before landing in the house's living room, then through a doorway and into the dining room. Wanda and Robert Donahue were watching television in another room when the object from outer space struck their house, and were uninjured. Coincidentally, a meteorite had fallen through the roof of another home in Wethersfield, 11 years earlier, at 341 Middletown Avenue, on April 8, 1971, 1.5 miles (2.4 km) away from the Church Street home.
- In Biloxi, Mississippi, a mentally ill inmate started a fire at the Harrison County Jail by igniting the polyurethane foam on the walls using a cigarette, killing 29 inmates and injuring 41 other people. At the time that the fire was reported at 1:31 in the morning, there were 97 inmates and three employees present. Keys to the cell were dropped by both a prison guard (who was overcome by the toxic smoke) and the warden (who was being evacuated), slowing down rescue efforts.
- Born: Francesco Molinari, Italian professional golfer and 2018 British Open winner; in Torino
- Died: Marco de Gastyne, 93, French film director and painter

== November 9, 1982 (Tuesday) ==
- Italian-born American bank robber and leftist Silvia Baraldini was located and arrested at her apartment building at 200 West 9th Street on New York City, three years after she had helped Assata Shakur escape from a women's prison and then helped with several bank robberies, during which two security guards had been killed. Found guilty of conspiracy to commit armed robberies under the federal Racketeer Influenced and Corrupt Organizations Act (RICO) law, Baraldini would be sentenced to 43 years in a maximum security prison in Lexington, Kentucky, and spend 17 years in American prisons before being moved in 1989 to incarceration in Italy at that nation's request, but moved to house arrest in 2001 and then pardoned in 2006.

== November 10, 1982 (Wednesday) ==
- Leonid Brezhnev, the leader of the Soviet Union since 1964 as the First Secretary of the Communist Party of the Soviet Union, and as the head of state as Chairman of the Presidium since 1977, died at the age of 75.
- Vasily Kuznetsov, the First Deputy Chairman of the Presidium, temporarily succeeded Brezhnev as the Acting Chairman of the Presidium, and as the Acting Chairman of the Communist Party, until permanent successors could be selected.
- The women's national soccer football team for West Germany, organized by the Deutscher Fußball-Bund, played its first game, a 5 to 1 victory against the Swiss women's team in a game at Koblenz, with Doris Kresimon, making the first goal.
- Died: Elio Petri, 53, Italian film director, died from cancer

== November 11, 1982 (Thursday) ==
- In Lebanon, the bombing of the headquarters of the Israel Defense Forces occupying forces in Tyre killed 104 Israelis and at least 47 Lebanese civilians and PLO prisoners. A Peugeot 504 car, loaded with explosives, was driven by a Lebanese Shia Muslim suicide bomber from the terrorist group Hezbollah, Ahmad Qasir, into the seven-story building. Qasir detonated the bomb and leveled the building.
- The fifth launch of the NASA Space Shuttle, STS-5, took place at 7:19 in the morning (12:19 UTC) from Cape Canaveral as the shuttle Columbia was sent into orbit on the first U.S. mission with four astronauts. Mission commander Vance D. Brand, pilot Robert F. Overmyer, and mission specialists Joseph P. Allen and William B. Lenoir began a five-day orbit of the Earth, returning on November 16.
- On the planet Mars, the Viking 1 lander, which had touched down on July 20, 1976, ceased transmitting data to Earth after more than six years, when it was inadvertently sent a faulty computer command from Earth. The Jet Propulsion Laboratory in Pasadena, California, had transmitted a program intended to upload software for recharging the battery. In the process, the new program also did the overwriting of the existing software, erasing the program that allowed NASA to move the direction of Viking 1's transmission antenna, and the data could no longer be received on Earth.
- Charl Schwietert, who had taken office on November 8 as the Netherlands Defense Minister for Prime Minister Ruud Lubbers, resigned after admitting that he had falsified details of his qualifications in his curriculum vitae. Specifically, Schwietert claimed that he held a doctorate, although he had obtained no degree higher than a Bachelor of Arts university, and said that he had been a lieutenant in the Dutch Army, although he had only been a non-commissioned officer as a corporal.

== November 12, 1982 (Friday) ==
- In the Soviet Union, former KGB director Yuri Andropov was approved to succeed the late Leonid Brezhnev as the General Secretary of the Communist Party of the Soviet Union in what was reported to be a unanimous vote of the 319 members of the Party's Central Committee. At the time, with the CPSU being the only legal political party in the nation, the General Secretary of the Party was the de facto leader of the Soviet Union, although the de jure leaders were the Chairman of the Council of Ministers and the Chairman of the Presidium of the Supreme Soviet. Andropov had served as director of the Soviet Union's intelligence agency, the Committee for State Security (Komitet gosudarstvennoy bezopasnosti or KGB) from 1967 until his resignation on May 26, 1982.
- Born: Anne Hathaway, American film and television actress known for The Princess Diaries, The Devil Wears Prada and the 2012 film Les Misérables, for which she won an Academy Award; in Brooklyn, New York City
- Died:
  - Patrick Cowley, 32, American electronic dance music composer and pioneer, died from AIDS
  - Dorothy Round, 73, British tennis player who won the women's singles championship at Wimbledon in 1934 and 1937, and the Australian Open in 1935

== November 13, 1982 (Saturday) ==
- The Vietnam Veterans Memorial, the largest part of which is the Memorial Wall, was dedicated in Washington, D.C. at the conclusion of a parade on Constitution Avenue in honor of the veterans, living and dead, of the Vietnam War. The Memorial Wall consisted of two reflective black granite walls engraved with the names of all 57,939 Americans in military service known to have been killed or who became missing in action or died in Vietnam during the Vietnam War from 1959 to 1975, and arranged chronologically. In the years that followed, 381 additional names were added and the number had risen to 58,320 as of 2018.
- In a bout in Las Vegas for the World Boxing Association lightweight boxing title, defending champion Ray Mancini knocked down South Korean challenger Duk-koo Kim in the first 19 seconds of the 14th round in two punches after a 39-punch barrage in the 13th. Referee Richard Green stopped the fight and declared Mancini the winner by a knockout, and Kim was able to stand up, but collapsed in the ring and went into a coma from which he never woke up. Transported to Desert Springs Hospital, Kim underwent emergency surgery for two hours after a brain scan showed that he had a subdural hematoma, and then was placed on life support in an intensive care unit until his mother and brother could arrive from Korea, and would be removed from five days later.
- Born: Koda Kumi, Japanese R&B singer with nine No. 1 ranked bestselling albums; in Kyoto
- Died:
  - Chesney Allen, 88, English comedian and musician who was part of the duo of Flanagan and Allen
  - Aliza Begin, 62, wife of Israeli Prime Minister Menachem Begin, died from emphysema while her husband was in Los Angeles on an official visit to the United States. Mrs. Begin had been under care for critical illness at the Hadassah Hospital in Jerusalem The prime minister was scheduled to address 3,000 delegates of the National Council of Jewish Federations when he was informed of the death of his wife, who had urged him to travel to make the trip.

== November 14, 1982 (Sunday) ==
- The leader of Poland's outlawed Solidarity movement, Lech Wałęsa, was released from 11 months of internment near the Soviet border.
- Parliamentary elections were held in the People's Socialist Republic of Albania for approval of the government's slate of 250 candidates for the 250 seats of the unicameral Kuvendi. The slate of candidates had been approved by the sole legal political party in Albania, the communist Fronti Demokratik, led by the nation's de facto leader, Enver Hoxha, General Secretary of the Marxist Party of Labour of Albania. According to the official figures released by the government, all 1,627,968 of the registered voters were able to cast votes, with nine invalid and the other 1,627,959 votes for the slate of candidates. Of the nine votes ruled to be "invalid" none were in favor of the party, and in one of them, a lone Albanian voter "cast his ballot against the Communist Government," according to the Albania's press agency, ATSH.
- On the same day, Secretary Hoxha gave an Election Day speech and declared that Prime Minister Mehmet Shehu, who had committed suicide on December 17, 1981, had not taken his life because of depression, as previously reported, but because he had been revealed to have been a foreign agent spying for Yugoslavia against Albania. Hoxha described Shehu as "one of the most dangerous traitors and enemies" of the state.

== November 15, 1982 (Monday) ==
- The first free elections in Brazil in more than 17 years were held for all 479 seats in the Câmara dos Deputados, the lower house of Brazil's Congresso Nacional, and for 25 of the 81 seats of the upper house, the Senado Federal. While no party won a majority, the pro-government Partido Democrático Social, which supported Brazil's military dictatorship, led by General João Figueiredo of the Brazilian Army, increased its plurality to 235 seats.
- Died:
  - Vinoba Bhave, 87, Indian philosopher and advocate for nonviolence and human rights
  - Allen Woodring, 84, American sprinter and 1920 Olympic gold medalist in the 200 meter race

== November 16, 1982 (Tuesday) ==
- The U.S. space shuttle Columbia landed at Edwards Air Force Base in California at 6:33 in the morning local time after its fifth mission, and returned its four member crew five days after its November 11 launch.
- Born: Amar'e Stoudemire, American and Israeli pro basketball player (known in Israel as Yehoshophat ben Avraham), and 2003 NBA Rookie of the Year and 2026 enshrinee in the Basketball Hall of Fame; in Lake Wales, Florida
- Died:
  - Arthur Askey, 82, English comedian, actor and singer on film, radio and television
  - Lenny Murphy, 30, Northern Ireland serial killer, officer in the Ulster Volunteer Force (UVF) terrorist paramilitary group, and leader of the Shankill Butchers gang, was shot to death in Belfast by two gunmen of the Provisional Irish Republican Army terrorist paramilitary group. Murphy, suspected of murdering 11 people by himself and more than 23 others while working with the Shankill Butchers, had killed at least four of his victims after being released from Belfast's Maze Prison on July 16.
  - Al Haig, 60, American pianist and pioneer of the bebop style of jazz, died from a heart attack.

== November 17, 1982 (Wednesday) ==
- Dr. Bernard Ackerman of New York University announced that he and a team of researchers had discovered the bacterium that causes of the debilitating Lyme disease, an illness first identified in 1975.
- At Strasbourg in France, the European Parliament voted overwhelmingly to approve the accession of Portugal and Spain to the three European Communities (EC)— the European Economic Community or "Common Market"; the European Coal and Steel Community; and the European Atomic Energy Community. A motion to amend the resolution passed for the EC to require "the greatest firmness" in negotiating the entry of the two nations, which would become the 11th and 12th members of the Communities, forerunner of the European Union.
- The crash of a Bell 212 helicopter off of the northeast coast of Taiwan killed all 15 people on board. All of the passengers were technicians being transported to an oil exploration ship by the Chinese Petroleum Corporation.
- Died:
  - Duk-koo Kim, 27, South Korean boxer, was declared legally dead four days after suffering irreparable brain damage during a title bout for the WBA lightweight title, although his body was kept on life support until his organs could be removed to be donated to other people.
  - Ruth Donnelly, 86, American film and stage actress
  - Eduard Tubin, 77, Estonian-born Swedish symphonic composer known for 10 symphonies written between 1931 and 1973, died in Stockholm, where he had been living since 1944 after he and his family fled from the Soviet invasion of Estonia. At the time of his death, he had been working on his Symphony No. 10 but had not completed it.

== November 18, 1982 (Thursday) ==
- The NA32 experiment, also known as ACCMOR, a research project with a stated purpose of "investigation of charm production in hadronic interactions using high-resolution silicon detectors", was approved by the participating institutes as a collaboration of the University of Amsterdam, the University of Bristol, the European Organization for Nuclear Research (CERN), Jagiellonian University in Krakow, the Max Planck Institute and the Rutherford Appleton Laboratory. Data gathering took place between 1982 and 1986, with the analysis of results made from 1986 to 1996.
- Mariasela Álvarez of the Dominican Republic won the Miss World pageant at Royal Albert Hall in London.
- Born: Damon Wayans Jr., American television actor known for Happy Endings and New Girl; in Huntington, Vermont
- Died:
  - Hilton Edwards, 79, English-born Irish theatrical producer and actor, known for founding the Gate Theatre in Dublin
  - William P. McGivern, 65, American mystery novelist whose works were adapted to film, including 1954's The Big Heat

== November 19, 1982 (Friday) ==
- In India, the quadrennial Asian Games were opened by President Zail Singh in Delhi, with 3,411 athletes from 33 nations (the highest number in the Games' history) competing over the following two weeks. The island state of Goa became one of the last locations on Earth to receive television programming, which opened with a live broadcast of the ceremonies. Notably, the state of Haryana had banned Sikhs from traveling to the Games because of concerns that the Akali Dal organization would attempt to disrupt the events.
- As a result of bank fraud, regulators from the U.S. Comptroller of the Currency government closed down the Ranchlander National Bank, located in the small town of Melvin, Texas. After a week-long audit of Ranchlander's financial records, bank examiner David Baer declared that the examiners had discovered that the bank was insolvent because of "serious loan losses, coupled with suspected fraudulent activity, exhausted the bank's capital funds." The Federal Deposit Insurance Corporation (FDIC) would reimburse three million dollars worth of funds lost by Ranchlander's depositors, and prosecute convicted swindler Orrin Shaid as the mastermind of defrauding Ranchlander and other banks, notably by altering $1,000 certificates of deposit to be worth $100,000 as collateral for loans. Shaid would be sentenced to 35 years in prison in 1983.
- The Federation of the Swiss Watch Industry was created by the merger of two rival groups of manufacturers, the Swiss Federation of Watch Manufacturers’ Associations and the Swiss Chamber of Watchmaking.
- Born: Shin Dong-hyuk, North Korean defector and human rights activist, known for escaping the maximum security Camp 14 internment prison; at the Kaechon internment camp in Kaechon
- Died:
  - Erving Goffman, 60, Canadian-born American sociologist and pioneer in social theory, known for his 1956 book The Presentation of Self in Everyday Life and for Stigma: Notes on the Management of Spoiled Identity (1963)
  - Toña la Negra, 70 (stage name for Antonia del Carmen Peregrino Álvarez), Mexican singer and actress
  - Ernesto Colli, 42, Italian film, TV and stage character actor, died from an undisclosed illness.

== November 20, 1982 (Saturday) ==
- Down 20 to 18 with 0:04 left in their annual college football game against the Stanford Cardinal, the California Golden Bears executed "The Play" in a game. Kevin Moen of California received the kickoff, pitched a lateral pass to Richard Rodgers, who sent a lateral to Dwight Garner, who was tossed the ball back to Rodgers while being tackled. At the Stanford 45-yard line, Rodgers pitched to Mariet Ford, who tossed it back to Moen, who ran through Stanford band members who had prematurely come onto the field for what they thought was Stanford win, including trombone player Gary Tyrell, whom Moen knocked down as he reached the end zone. Moen's touchdown was upheld by the officials, and California won the game, 25 to 20.
- The last corridor highway, designed to connect landlocked West Berlin to the rest of the nation of West Germany in a path across the nation of Communist East Germany, was opened to road travel. In all, four corridors, along which sealed highways were constructed, were the only mode for driving between the two enemy countries. The new route, between Zarrentin am Schaalsee in East Germany to Gudow, Schleswig-Holstein in the West, replaced a previous route from Staaken to Lauenburg. Prior to the German reunification in 1990, the other east-to-west corridors were Marienborn to Helmstedt; Wartha to Herleshausen, Hesse; and Hirschberg upon Saale to Rudolphstein, Bavaria.
- At the age of seven, actress Drew Barrymore became the youngest person to host Saturday Night Live, a record that has remained unbroken for 45 years.
- The General Union of Ecuadorian Workers (UGTE) was founded.
- The University of British Columbia (UBC) Thunderbirds defeated the University of Western Ontario Mustangs, 39 to 14, before 14,759 spectators at Varsity Stadium in Toronto to with the Vanier Cup, the championship of Canadian college football.

== November 21, 1982 (Sunday) ==
- The first NCAA women's soccer championship was won by the University of North Carolina, 2 to 0, over the University of Central Florida (UCF) at the losing team's home stadium in Orlando. North Carolina had defeated in UCF in the last soccer championship of the Association for Intercollegiate Athletics for Women (AIAW) in 1981.
- Two weeks after taking power in a military coup, Upper Volta's new president, Dr. Jean-Baptiste Ouédraogo, announced on behalf of the ruling junta that civilian rule would be restored within two years and that a new constitution would be set for approval.
- The National Football League resumed playing, two months after the NFL had last had a game, with seven more regular season contests for each team after seven weeks had been canceled by the NFL Players Association strike.

== November 22, 1982 (Monday) ==
- U.S. President Ronald Reagan announced that he had ordered a change in the deployment of the nation's Peacekeeper nuclear missiles to the "dense pack" arrangement, officially "closely spaced basing". The new proposal, replaced the previous 1979 concept of "racetrack deployment" which would have consisted of periodic moves of missiles from one silo to another to avoid detection, but which would have required large tracts of land in Nevada and Utah. The dense pack system, to be built at Francis E. Warren Air Force Base in Wyoming, would consist of as many as 100 super-hardened missile silos in a single location, spaced 1,800 feet (550 m) apart, to ensure that a single enemy nuclear warhead could not destroy more than one silo. Reagan's message marked the first time that he had used the name "Peacekeeper" for what had formerly been called the "MX missile".
- Albania's head of state since 1953, Haxhi Lleshi, was forcibly retired at the age of 69 by Enver Hoxha, the General Secretary of the Marxist nation's sole political party, the Party of Labor. In Lleshi's place as Chairman of the Presidium of the Albanian People's Assembly, Hoxha appointed Politburo member Ramiz Alia, who would succeed Hoxha less than three years later as General Secretary.
- General Secretary Yuri Andropov of the Soviet Communist Party appointed a former colleague from the KGB, Heydar Aliyev to full membership in the 18-member Politburo that governed the Party and, by extension, the nation. Aliyev, the leader of the Communist Party of the Azerbaijani SSR, had been a candidate member since 1976.
- The Clemson Tigers, recognized by the NCAA as the defending national college football champions, were placed on two years probation by the NCAA for recruiting violations, six days before their final game of the season. The ruling meant not only that the team, ranked No. 10 in the polls at the time, would be ineligible for an invitation to a postseason bowl game and, although it finished with the best record in the Atlantic Coast Conference, ineligible to win the ACC title.
- Born: Steve Angello (stage name for Steve Patrik Fragogiannis), Greek-born Swedish singer who was a member of the Swedish House Mafia trio; in Athens
- Died: Roy Hofheinz, 70, mayor of Houston, Texas from 1953 to 1956, known for being co-owner of the Houston Astros major league baseball team and for the development of the first domed stadium for baseball and football, the Astrodome

== November 23, 1982 (Tuesday) ==
- Born: Asafa Powell, Jamaican sprinter who twice held the world record for the fastest 100 meters from 2005 to 2008; in Spanish Town

== November 24, 1982 (Wednesday) ==
- Representatives from 88 countries gathered in Geneva to discuss world trade and ways to work toward aspects of free trade.
- Born: Mangte Chungneijang "Mary" Kom, Indian boxer, winner of six world championships in women's boxing and former member of the Rajya Sabha, the upper house of India's national parliament; in Kagathei village, Churachandpur, Manipur state
- Died: Barack Obama Sr., 48, Kenyan economist and former economic analyst for the Kenyan government, known for being the father of future U.S. President Barack Obama, was killed in an automobile accident in Nairobi

== November 25, 1982 (Thursday) ==
- The South American nation of Suriname entered the oil industry as drilling was started by the government-owned company Staatsolie. Oil had been discovered in 1965 when Suriname was still Dutch Guiana, a colony of the Netherlands, and the first drilling took place outside the village of Tambaredjo, with crude oil being produced five years later.
- The costliest fire in the history of the U.S. state of Minnesota, with at least USD $90,000,000 worth of damages, broke out in downtown Minneapolis on the U.S. Thanksgiving Day holiday. Two boys, aged 12 and 13, went into a vacant building that had once housed Donaldson's Department store, found a butane torch, and started the blaze which spread to the fifth floor of the Northwestern National Bank Building. More than 130 firefighters of the Minneapolis Fire Department were able to prevent the flames from spreading to other buildings.
- Born: Minna Kauppi, Finnish orienteer with 10 gold medals in six world championships; in Asikkala
- Died: Hugh Harman, 79, American animator known for his co-creation (with Rudolf Ising) of Harman-Ising Productions and creation of the Looney Tunes and Merrie Melodies cartoon franchise

== November 26, 1982 (Friday) ==
- Yasuhiro Nakasone was elected by Japan's Parliament, the National Diet as the new Prime Minister of Japan, succeeding Prime Minister Zenko Suzuki, who had announced his resignation in October. Nakasone had succeeded Suzuki as the president of the ruling Liberal Democratic Party (LDP) on November 24. In a vote along party lines, Nakasone defeated Japan Socialist Party chairman Ichio Asukata, 287 to 102 in Japan's House of Representatives and 130-106 in the House of Councillors. Nakasone had been assured approval after winning the presidency of the LDP on November 24.
- Died: Robert Coote, 73, English character actor in film and on stage, known for originating the role of Colonel Pickering in the long-running Broadway musical of My Fair Lady

== November 27, 1982 (Saturday) ==
- Born: Aleksandr Kerzhakov, Russian soccer football striker with 91 caps for the Russia national team; in Kingisepp, Leningrad Oblast, Russian SFSR, Soviet Union
- Died: Steve Gordon, 44, American film director who had written and directed the 1981 hit film Arthur, died from a heart attack

== November 28, 1982 (Sunday) ==
- The Edmonton Eskimos won an unprecedented fifth consecutive Grey Cup – a championship feat that had not yet been unaccomplished by any professional football franchise – with a 32–16 defeat of the .
- Al Ahly SC won the African Cup of Champions club (later known as the CAF Champions League) for the first time after, defeating Ghanaian Asante Kotoko in the final
- Died: Helen of Greece and Denmark, 86, daughter of King Constantine I of Greece and Queen Mother of Romania from 1940 to 1947

== November 29, 1982 (Monday) ==
- Michael Jackson released his sixth studio album, Thriller, in the United States. Thriller would go on to be the best-selling record album of all time.
- The crash of ACES Colombia Flight 189 in Colombia killed all 22 people on board. The de Havilland Twin Otter 310 turboprop had departed San José del Guaviare on a flight to Bogotá in poor weather, and struck the Cerro Pan de Azúcar mountain near the towns of San Juanito, Meta and Quetame, Cundinamarca during its approach.
- The crash of a chartered TAAG Angola Airlines Antonov An-24 turboprop, into the side of a mountain in Angola, killed all 15 people aboard. The airplane was flying at an altitude of 2,250 metres (7,380 ft) when it struck the 2,270 metres (7,450 ft)-high Monte Bibala near the city of Lubango.
- Born:
  - Lucas Black, American film and TV actor known for three of the Fast & Furious films and for the shows American Gothic and NCIS: New Orleans; in Decatur, Alabama
  - John Mensah, Ghanaian soccer football centre with 86 caps for the Ghana national team; in Obuasi
- Died:
  - Percy Williams, 74, Canadian sprinter who set the world record (10.3 seconds) for the fastest 100 meter dash and held it from 1930 to 1936, and won 1928 Olympic gold medal for the 100m and 200m races, shot himself to death with a shotgun that he had been awarded for his Olympic achievement.
  - General Hermann Balck, 88, German Army officer who was General of Armored Troops (General der Panzertruppe) during World War II

== November 30, 1982 (Tuesday) ==
- The Columbia Pictures epic film Gandhi, starring Ben Kingsley (Krishna Pandit Bhanji) in the title role premiered at theaters in New Delhi before being released in the UK on December 3 and in the United States on December 8. With more than 300,000 extras it had the largest paid cast of any film in world history.
- Born: Elisha Cuthbert, Canadian TV and film actress known for the 1998 film Airspeed and for the TV series 24 in Calgary
- Died:
  - Salvatore Scaglione, 42, Sicilian crime boss, was murdered on orders of gangland rival Salvatore Riina of the Corleonesi family, along with Rosario Riccobono and three other members of his gang after being invited to a meeting at San Giuseppe Jato. Scaglione's disappearance made his death an uncertainty to investigators, and his body would never be found.
  - Verna Fields, 64, American film editor and sound editor
