= Bob Spear (naturalist) =

Bob Spear (February 21, 1920 – October 19, 2014) was an American naturalist, birdwatcher and master woodcarver who was the founding director of the Birds of Vermont Museum (BOVM), he was influential in the birding and environmental communities, having co-founded Vermont's first chapter of the National Audubon Society and having created more than 470 biologically accurate bird carvings on display at the BOVM. He was also the author of the book, The Birds of Vermont, published in 1969 by the Green Mountain Audubon Society. He resided in Huntington, Vermont United States.

== The first half century ==
Bob Spear was born in 1920 into a Vermont farming family. During his youth his family moved to Westfield, Massachusetts because his mother, who was a teacher, could not get a teaching job in Vermont (married women could not be employed as teachers at that time). Spear credits his mother with inspiring his interest in birds, nature, and art. Following her death, the family moved back to Vermont and settled on a farm in Colchester. In 1938, a stray parakeet flew into their barn, moving Spear to create his first bird carving using only a penknife. This early carving is now on display at the Birds of Vermont Museum.

During World War II, Spear served in the US Navy as a radar technician. After his release from military service, he returned to Vermont and went to work at the General Electric (GE) plant in Burlington. He also enrolled in courses at the University of Vermont. While at GE, most of his lunch hours were spent birding on Blodgett Beach on Lake Champlain. During this time, Spear married, raised a family, served as a boy scout troop leader, carved several guitars, and honed his wood carving skills.

== Birds and nature ==
Spear left GE in 1972. He had already started to forge a career in the birding world and by 1974 he had started an Environmental Day. In 1979 he started creating a collection of bird carvings in hopes of someday establishing a location where people could come to see them and learn about birds. In the late 1970s, he was active in establishing the Green Mountain Audubon Center in Huntington and served as its first director for seven years.

In 1987, the Birds of Vermont Museum opened. In addition to creating all the bird carvings and their display cases, Spear also helped design and build the museum itself. At the time of the opening, the museum housed only 231 bird carvings. Spear continued to carve more species of birds and the museum's collection has since swelled to more than 498 carvings. (The collection now includes a few carvings from Spear's apprentice, fellow carver, and former curator Ingrid Brown, and 4 from fellow carver and board member Richard Allen.) The length of time required for Spear to complete a carving varies widely, depending on the size of the bird. Small birds can take as little as 40 hours to carve and paint. Prior to completing a wild turkey carving, which required 1,230 hours, Spear's carving of a California condor had held the honor of having required the most hours to complete (500 hours).

== Awards and recognition ==
- 1979 – Science Educators Award for Outstanding Contribution
- 1986 – National Wildlife Federation Wildlife Conservation Award
- 2004 – Birds of Vermont Museum, along with Green Mountain Audubon Center, recognized as an Important Bird Area
- 2007 – Governor's Heritage Award for Traditional Arts

== See also ==
- Birds of Vermont Museum
- Wood carving
- National Audubon Society
- Vermont Institute of Natural Science
- Birding
- American Birding Association
- List of birdwatchers

== Sources ==
- The Valley Voice. 10 May 2000, 5 December 2001
- Burlington Free Press. 2 August 2003, 26 June 2004
- Vermont Maturity. April 2005
- Business Profile Vermont. February 2007
- Vermont Sunday Magazine. 8 April 2007
- the Times Ink. July 2011
