= Birds of Vermont Museum =

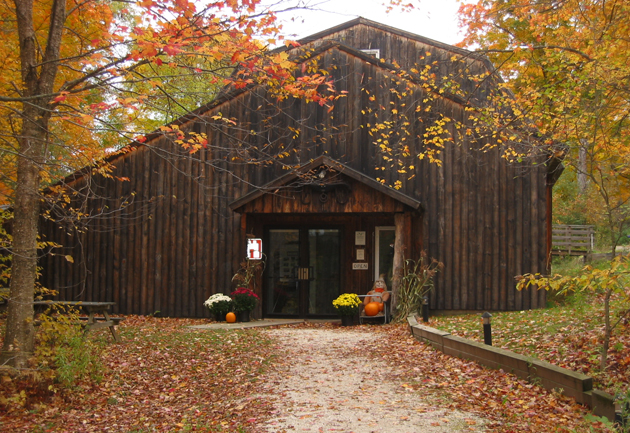
- Established: 1987
- Location: 900 Sherman Hollow Road; Huntington, Vermont, United States
- Coordinates: 44.3517°N 73.0067°W
- Type: Natural history
- Website: www.birdsofvermont.org

The Birds of Vermont Museum (BOVM) is a non-profit institution established in 1987 in Huntington, Vermont, United States. It was created to preserve and exhibit a collection of lifelike bird carvings for the purpose of educating people about the role of birds in the ecosystem. Today, the museum is surrounded by a 100-acre (0.40 km^{2}) bird sanctuary and displays more than 495 biologically accurate woodcarvings created by Bob Spear, a Vermont naturalist and master woodcarver.

== History ==
Bob Spear, BOVM founding director, began carving birds in the 1950s. He realized early on that people can learn more about the beauty and identification of birds through observing carvings than from observing taxidermy specimens. Thus during the 1960s, he began carving birds specifically to use in demonstrations for school children. In 1979, when Spear retired, he started creating a collection of bird carvings in hopes of someday establishing a location where people could come to see them and learn about birds. Eight years later, the museum was established with the assistance and support of its charter members, consisting of family and friends as well as other interested parties. When BOVM opened to the public in 1987, there were 231 completed nesting bird carvings in a gallery on one floor.

Since that time, the museum has grown to two floors and expanded the collection to include eight more exhibits. A bird observation window was added in the early 1990s along with the first floor exhibits, classroom facilities and a gift shop. In 1998, Ingrid Rhind joined the staff and eventually became the museum's curator. Having previously studied art, she began carving birds under Spear's tutelage and eventually became his apprentice. As of 2008, Rhind had completed six carvings for the wetland diorama. In 2004, BOVM was named a Vermont Important Bird Area (IBA) in conjunction with Green Mountain Audubon Center. A feeder cam was added to the museum's website in 2005. In 2008 BOVM became an affiliate of Vermont eBird. Bob Spear died in 2014.

== Exhibits ==
The museum features a variety of bird exhibits including a wetland diorama, a winter diorama, a raptor exhibit, an exhibit of endangered and extinct bird species, tropical birds, two displays depicting birds in the Lake Champlain Basin, and representations of 260 of Vermont's nesting birds portrayed in their native habitats with biologically accurate nests and eggs.

== Programming ==
In addition to the bird carving exhibits, BOVM offers bird walks along the museum's nature trails, carving demonstrations, hosts lectures and art classes, and exhibits the work of local artists.

BOVM's varied habitat makes it a prime location for research programs. Current on-going projects include a wildflower inventory, a breeding bird survey, bird species point counts (joint project with Green Mountain Audubon Center), an annual butterfly count, and a mammal inventory.

== Location ==
The museum is located on Sherman Hollow Road in Huntington, Vermont, 6 miles (10 km) south of Richmond village.

== See also ==
- Wood carving
- National Audubon Society
- Vermont Institute of Natural Science
- Birdwatching
- American Birding Association
