= Hanksville, Vermont =

Census-designated place in Vermont, United States

- Census-designated place
- Location within Vermont Location within the United States
- Coordinates: 44°14′58″N 72°57′37″W
- Country: United States
- State: Vermont
- County: Chittenden
- Town: Huntington

Area
  - Total: 0.13 sq mi (0.34 km^{2})
  - Land: 0.13 sq mi (0.34 km^{2})
  - Water: 0 sq mi (0.0 km^{2})
- Elevation: 909 ft (277 m)
- Time zone: UTC-5 (Eastern (EST))
  - Summer (DST): UTC-4 (EDT)
- ZIP Code: 05462 (Huntington)
- Area code: 802
- FIPS code: 50-31600
- GNIS feature ID: 2807134
- Website: 2807134

Hanksville is an unincorporated village and census-designated place (CDP) in the town of Huntington, Chittenden County, Vermont, United States. It was first listed as a CDP prior to the 2020 census. As of the 2020 census, Hanksville had a population of 62.

== Geography ==
The village is in southeastern Chittenden County, in the southern part of the town of Huntington, in the valley of the Huntington River, a north-flowing tributary of the Winooski River. The main ridge of the Green Mountains rises to the east, running from 3,160-foot (960 m) Burnt Rock Mountain in the north to 2,967-foot (904 m) Molly Stark Mountain in the south. Main Road runs the length of the community, following the Huntington River; it leads north 3.5 miles (5.6 km) to Huntington Center and south 2.5 miles (4.0 km) to Vermont Route 17 at the western base of Appalachian Gap.
