= Huntington (CDP), Vermont =

Census-designated place in Vermont, United States

Huntington, Vermont
- Census-designated place
- Location within Vermont Location within the United States
- Coordinates: 44°19′52″N 72°59′42″W
- Country: United States
- State: Vermont
- County: Chittenden
- Town: Huntington

Area
  - Total: 0.85 sq mi (2.21 km^{2})
  - Land: 0.82 sq mi (2.13 km^{2})
  - Water: 0.031 sq mi (0.08 km^{2})
- Elevation: 604 ft (184 m)
- Time zone: UTC-5 (Eastern (EST))
  - Summer (DST): UTC-4 (EDT)
- ZIP Code: 05462 (Huntington)
- Area code: 802
- FIPS code: 50-34525
- GNIS feature ID: 2807135

Huntington is an unincorporated village and census-designated place (CDP) in the town of Huntington, Chittenden County, Vermont, United States. It was first listed as a CDP prior to the 2020 census.

== Geography ==
The village is in southeastern Chittenden County, in the northwest part of the town of Huntington, in the valley of the Huntington River, a north-flowing tributary of the Winooski River. It is 2.5 miles (4.0 km) north of Huntington Center, 8 miles (13 km) east of Hinesburg, and 7 miles (11 km) south of Richmond. Burlington is 20 miles (32 km) to the northwest. 4,083-foot (1,244 m) Camel's Hump rises 5 miles (8 km) to the east on the crest of the Green Mountains.
