= Huntington Lower Village Church =

Historic church in Vermont, United States

- U.S. National Register of Historic Places
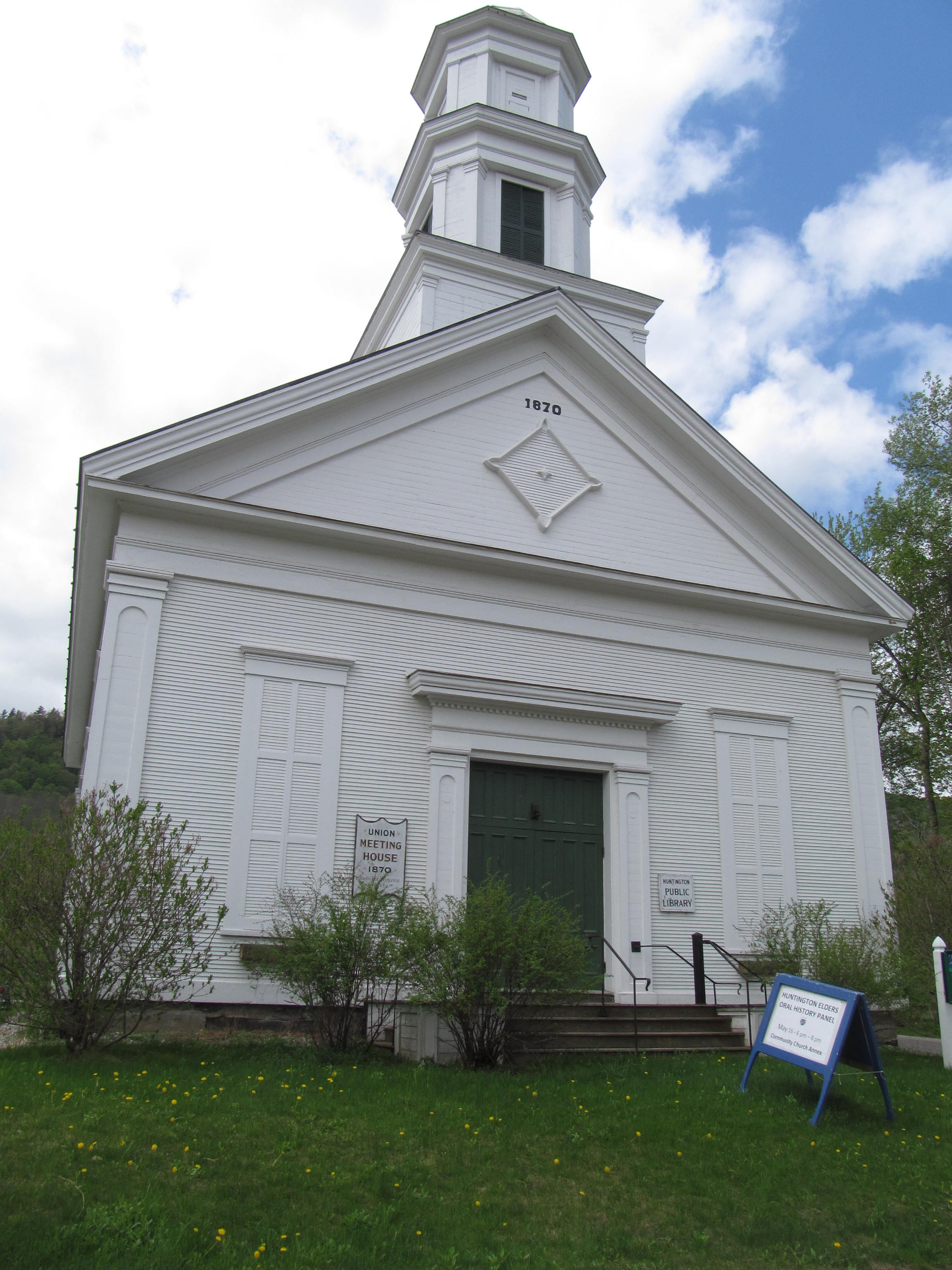

- Location within Vermont Location within the United States
- Interactive map showing the location of Huntington Lower Village Church
- Location: 2156 Main Rd., Huntington, Vermont
- Coordinates: 44°19′36″N 72°59′17″W
- Area: 0.4 acres (0.16 ha)
- Built: 1870
- Architectural style: Greek Revival
- NRHP reference No.: 84003463
- Added to NRHP: August 23, 1984

The Huntington Lower Village Church, also known historically as the Huntington Union Meeting House, is a historic church building at 2156 Main Road in Huntington, Vermont. Built in 1870, it is a fine late example of Greek Revival architecture. It now houses the Huntington Public Library and serves as a community center. It was listed on the National Register of Historic Places in 1984.

== Description and history ==
The former Huntington Lower Village Church building stands in the rural village center of Huntington, on the west side of Main Road north of its junction with Bridge Street. It is a single-story wood frame structure, with a gabled roof and clapboarded exterior. A three-stage tower rises from the ridge line behind the front facade. Its first stage is square, with corner pilasters and small cornice and entablature. The second stage is octagonal, with corner pilasters and blind louvered openings on four side. The third stage, which houses the belfry, is a reduced version of the second stage, and is capped by a round cupola. The building's corners have paneled pilasters, which rise to a broad entablature that extends across the front and sides. The main entrance is centered, with flanking paneled pilasters rising to an entablature and cornice. The gable above is fully pedimented, with an applied diamond form at its center.

The church was built in 1870, on the site of an older church built in 1839 for the use of multiple religious organizations. The older building (no longer standing) was moved a short distance to serve as town hall. The present building saw use by religious organizations into the 20th century, its usage gradually declining. Its main hall has since been converted to house the town library, and other spaces are available for community use.

== See also ==
- National Register of Historic Places listings in Chittenden County, Vermont
