= Charles Bowles (minister) =

American itinerant preacher (1761–1843)

- Born: October 20, 1761; Boston, Massachusetts, U.S.
- Died: March 16, 1843 (aged 81); Malone, New York, U.S.
- Occupations: minister, farmer, soldier

Charles Bowles (October 20, 1761 – March 16, 1843) was an American itinerant preacher and Free Will Baptist who preached across Vermont and established the first church in Huntington, Vermont. He served in the Continental Army during the American Revolutionary War. Bowles was African American.

== Early life and military service ==
Bowles was born in Boston, Massachusetts, on October 20, 1761, to a white woman of some social standing and an "African" father, according to biographer John W. Lewis. His father, a domestic servant who may have been enslaved, raised him as an infant before apprenticing him to a white man named Jones in Lunenburg, Massachusetts, a distance of over forty miles from Boston. After Jones died in 1773, the twelve-year-old Bowles became an indentured servant in a Loyalist household.

When the American Revolutionary War erupted two years later, Bowles ran away to join the Continental Army, serving as valet to an artillery officer at the Siege of Boston beginning in May 1775. In 1777, at the age of 16, he enlisted in the Continental Army as a private. He served for the duration of the war, deploying to Massachusetts, Pennsylvania, New York, and New Hampshire and completing his military service after a final three years in General Enoch Poor's brigade. He received an honorable discharge at Newburgh, New York, in 1782 and successfully applied for a military pension starting in 1818.

== Religious leadership ==
After leaving the army, Bowles moved to Warren, New Hampshire, where he farmed, started a family, and joined a Reformed Baptist congregation in the neighboring town of Wentworth. He felt called to the ministry and began preaching in neighboring towns, but his "book education was nothing," according to Lewis, and he battled poverty and self-doubt. Frustrated, Bowles went to sea in service as a ship's cook. After three years at sea, he experienced a religious conversion and became a Free Will Baptist, abandoning the Calvinist doctrine of predestination. Bowles preached in Massachusetts and Rhode Island from 1808 to 1816, when he moved to north-central Vermont, which lacked Free Will churches. Ordained in November 1816, Bowles preached throughout Vermont, especially in the northern Chittenden, Franklin, and Washington counties. He purchased farmland and formed a large congregation of ninety souls in Huntington, Vermont, where families converted by Bowles constructed Huntington's first church building, which later became the first town hall and ultimately the first volunteer fire department. The former church is the oldest surviving building in Huntington. In 1837, at his son's behest, Bowles moved to the North Country region of upstate New York, where he continued to travel, preach, and form churches. According to Le Roy Froom, he may have become a Millerite late in life, though Bowles's biographer, Black abolitionist and Millerite minister John W. Lewis, made no such claim.

Touring predominantly white and rural communities of Vermont and New York, Bowles experienced racism and threats of physical violence but persisted in his vocation. He openly condemned slavery. Lewis remarked that his influence had contributed to "revolutionizing the public sentiment of the State, against the abomination of American slavery" and to "destroying prejudice against color." According to Lewis, hearing Bowles preach "was enough to make abolitionists of a whole community." His race also drew crowds of Vermonters eager for the rare spectacle of a Black preacher. During his forty years of ministry, Bowles baptized many hundreds of converts and organized numerous churches in the towns through which he passed.

== Ancestry and family ==
According to church elder John W. Lewis, who wrote Bowles's biography in 1852 without personal knowledge of his subject, Bowles's father was a Black "servant," while his mother was white and from a respected family, supposedly "a daughter of the celebrated Col. Morgan, an Officer in the Rifle Corps of the American army" during the Revolutionary War. Notwithstanding this claim, Bowles's grandfather could not have been Daniel Morgan, who was born circa 1735 and whose daughters by Abigail Curry were born in the 1760s. Bowles's familial connection to the Morgans was likely a family legend.

While living in New Hampshire in 1784, Bowles married Mary Corliss (born 1768), whom Lewis reported to have been "his cousin, a granddaughter of the above named Col. Morgan." According to historians Anthony Parent and Glenn Knoblock, this familial connection is highly unlikely but does suggest that Corliss was a white woman. No documentation exists to corrobate any familial connection between Bowles, Corliss, and Daniel Morgan.

The Bowleses had eleven children, one of whom, Charles Bowles II, became a Presbyterian pastor in St. Lawrence County, New York.

== Later life and death ==
In old age, Bowles purchased a small farm and settled down in Malone, New York, with his daughter Eunice. He died on March 16, 1843, at age 81.
