= Sainte-Colombe, Hautes-Alpes =

Sainte-Colombe
- Commune
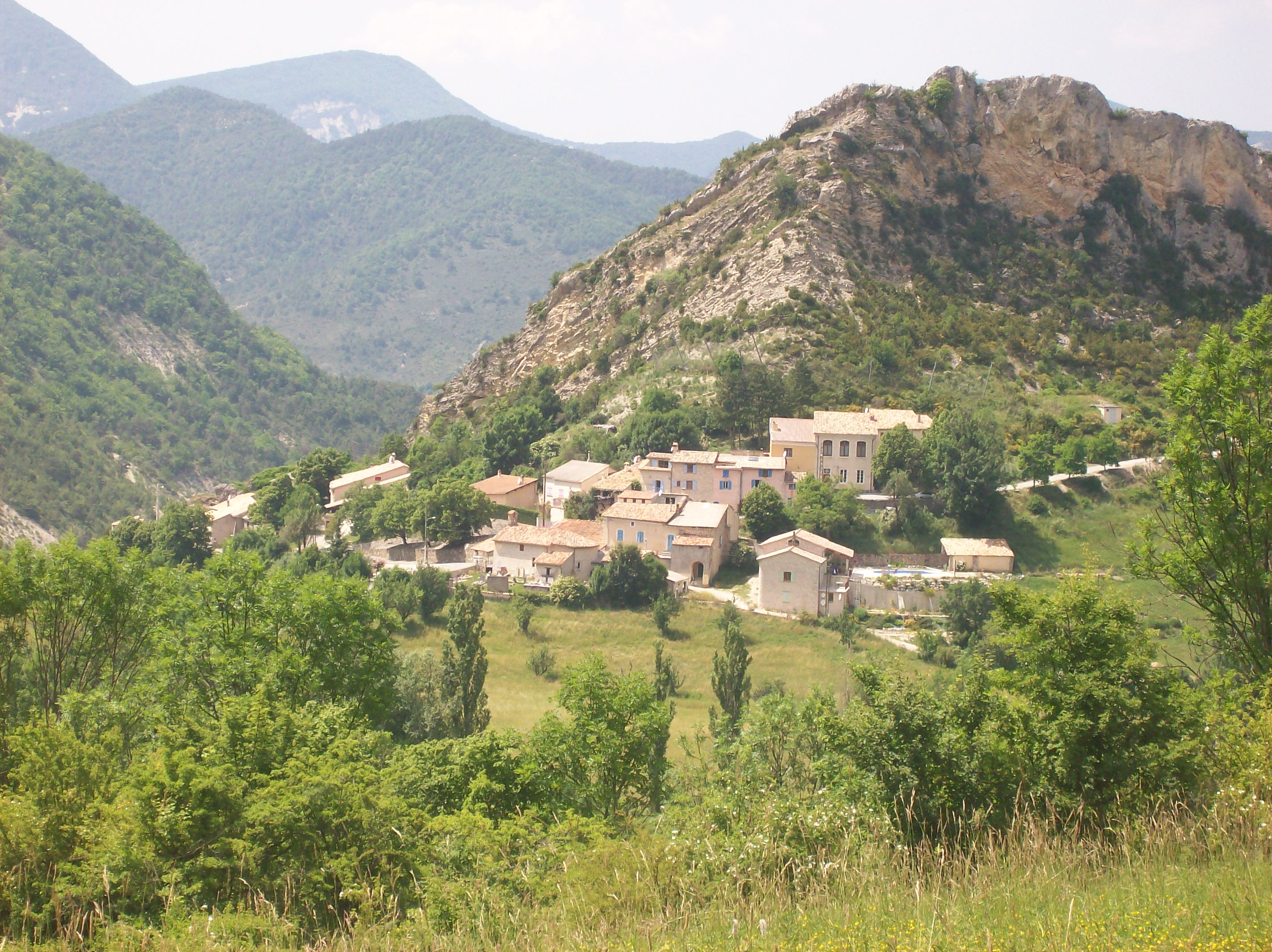
- A general view of the village of Sainte-Colombe
- Location of Sainte-Colombe
- Location within France Location within Provence-Alpes-Côte d'Azur
- Coordinates: 44°17′08″N 5°40′10″E
- Country: France
- Region: Provence-Alpes-Côte d'Azur
- Department: Hautes-Alpes
- Arrondissement: Gap
- Canton: Serres

Government
  - Mayor (2026–32): Jean-Pierre Roux
- Area^{1}: 17.18 km^{2} (6.63 sq mi)
- Elevation: 920 m (3,020 ft)
- Highest elevation: 1,360 m (4,460 ft)
- Lowest elevation: 715 m (2,346 ft)
- Population (2023): 65
  - Density: 3.8/km^{2} (9.8/sq mi)
- Time zone: UTC+01:00 (CET)
  - Summer (DST): UTC+02:00 (CEST)
- INSEE/Postal code: 05135 /05700
- ^{1} French Land Register data, which excludes lakes, ponds, glaciers > 1 km^{2} (0.386 sq mi or 247 acres) and river estuaries.

Sainte-Colombe (French pronunciation: [sɛ̃t kɔlɔ̃b]; Vivaro-Alpine: Santa Colomba) is a commune in the Hautes-Alpes department in southeastern France. It is surrounded by mountains.

== Population ==
Historical population
Year	Pop.	±% p.a.
1968	56	—
1975	51	−1.33%
1982	49	−0.57%
1990	43	−1.62%
1999	50	+1.69%
2007	52	+0.49%
2012	62	+3.58%
2017	55	−2.37%
2023	65	+2.82%
Source: INSEE

== See also ==
- Communes of the Hautes-Alpes department
