= NGC 1187 =

Barred spiral galaxy in Eridanus

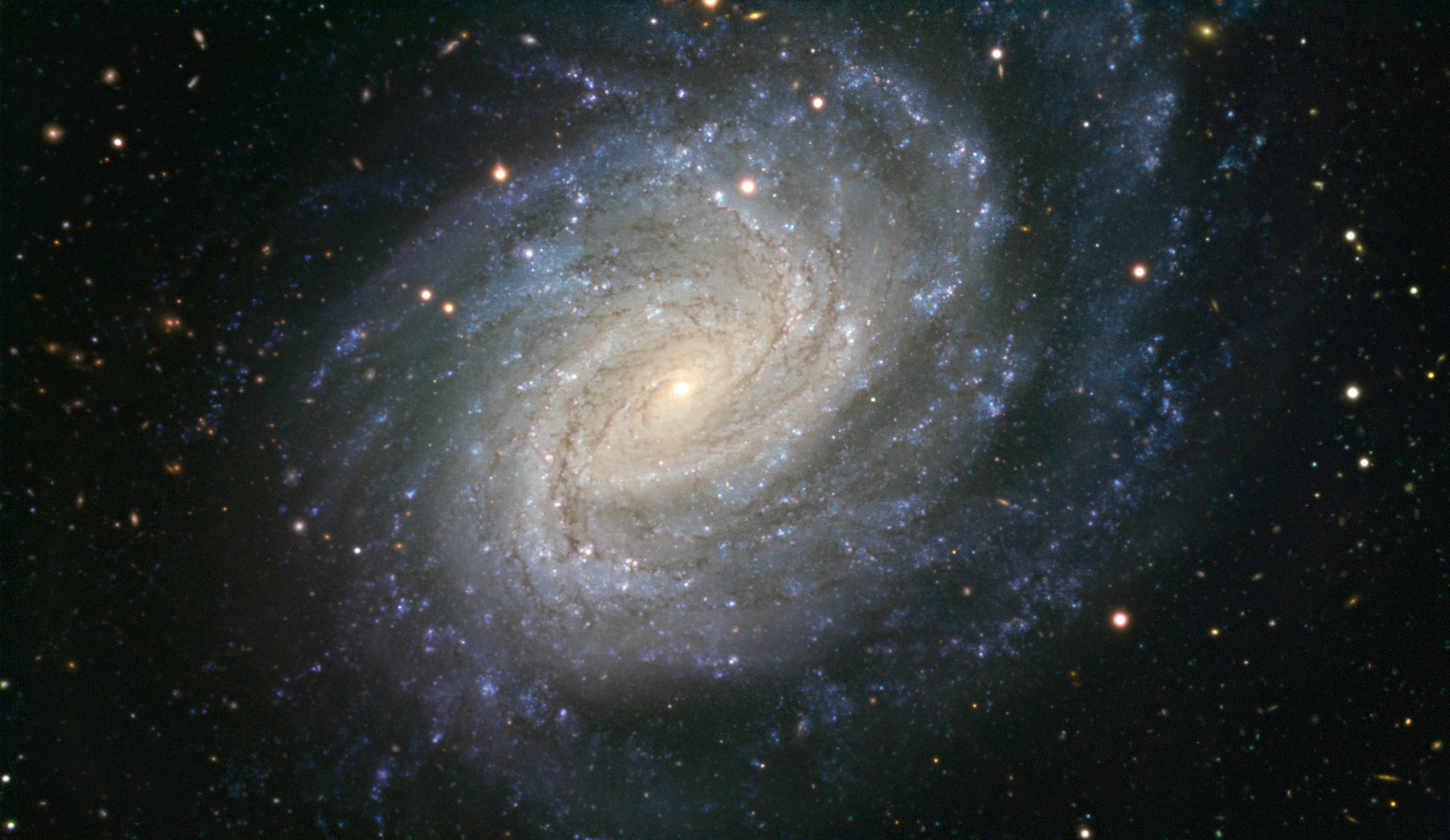
- NGC 1187 imaged by ESO’s Very Large Telescope.

Observation data (J2000 epoch)
- Constellation: Eridanus
- Right ascension: 03^{h} 02^{m} 37.40^{s}
- Declination: −22° 52′ 02.0″
- Redshift: 0.004657
- Heliocentric radial velocity: 1393 km/s
- Distance: 60 million ly
- Apparent magnitude (V): 11.4

Characteristics
- Type: SB(r)c
- Apparent size (V): 5.370′ x 3.630′

Other designations
- HIPASS J0302-22, MCG -04-08-016, UGCA 49, AM 0300-230, IRAS 03003-2303, NVSS J030237-225200, 6dFGS gJ030237.6-225202, PSCz Q03003-2303, DUGRS 480-001, LEDA 11479, ESO 480-023, 2MASX J03023758-2252017, SGC 030024-2303.8, MBG 03004-2303.

NGC 1187 is a barred spiral galaxy located about 60 million light-years away in the constellation of Eridanus. It was discovered on December 9, 1784 by the astronomer William Herschel.

== Supernovae ==
Two supernovae have been observed in NGC 1187:

- SN 1982R (Type I, mag. 14.4) was discovered by A. Muller and O. Pizarro at the La Silla Observatory on 24 October 1982.
- SN 2007Y (Type Ib-pec, mag. 17.5) was discovered by amateur astronomer Berto Monard on 15 February 2007.

== Gallery ==
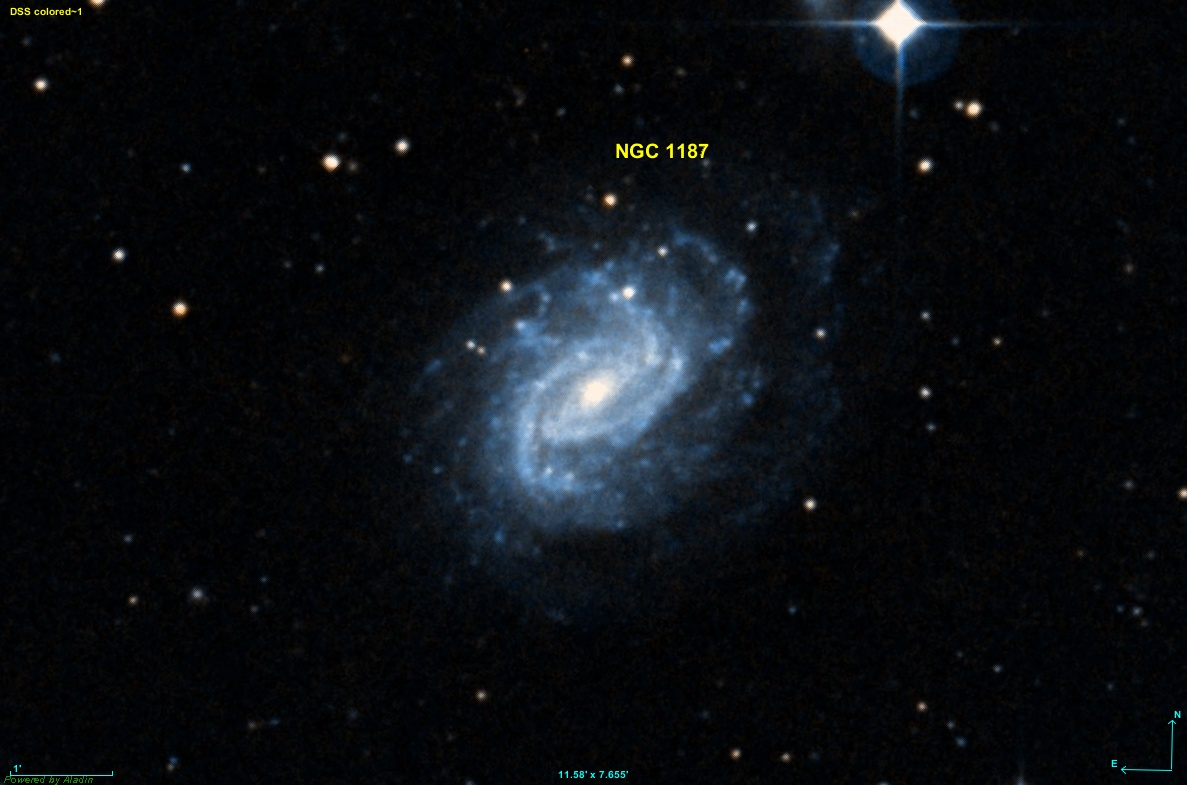
DSS image of NGC 1187.

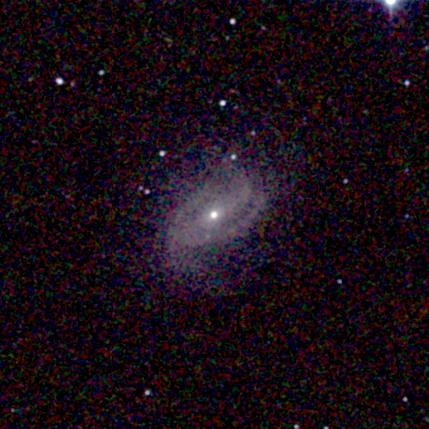
NGC 1187 by 2MASS

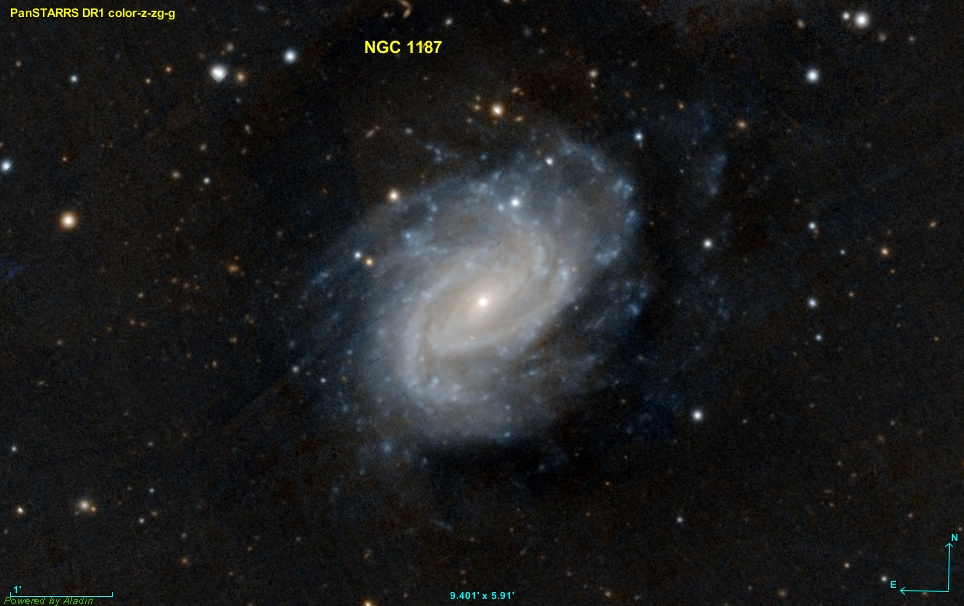
NGC 1187 by Pan-STARRS

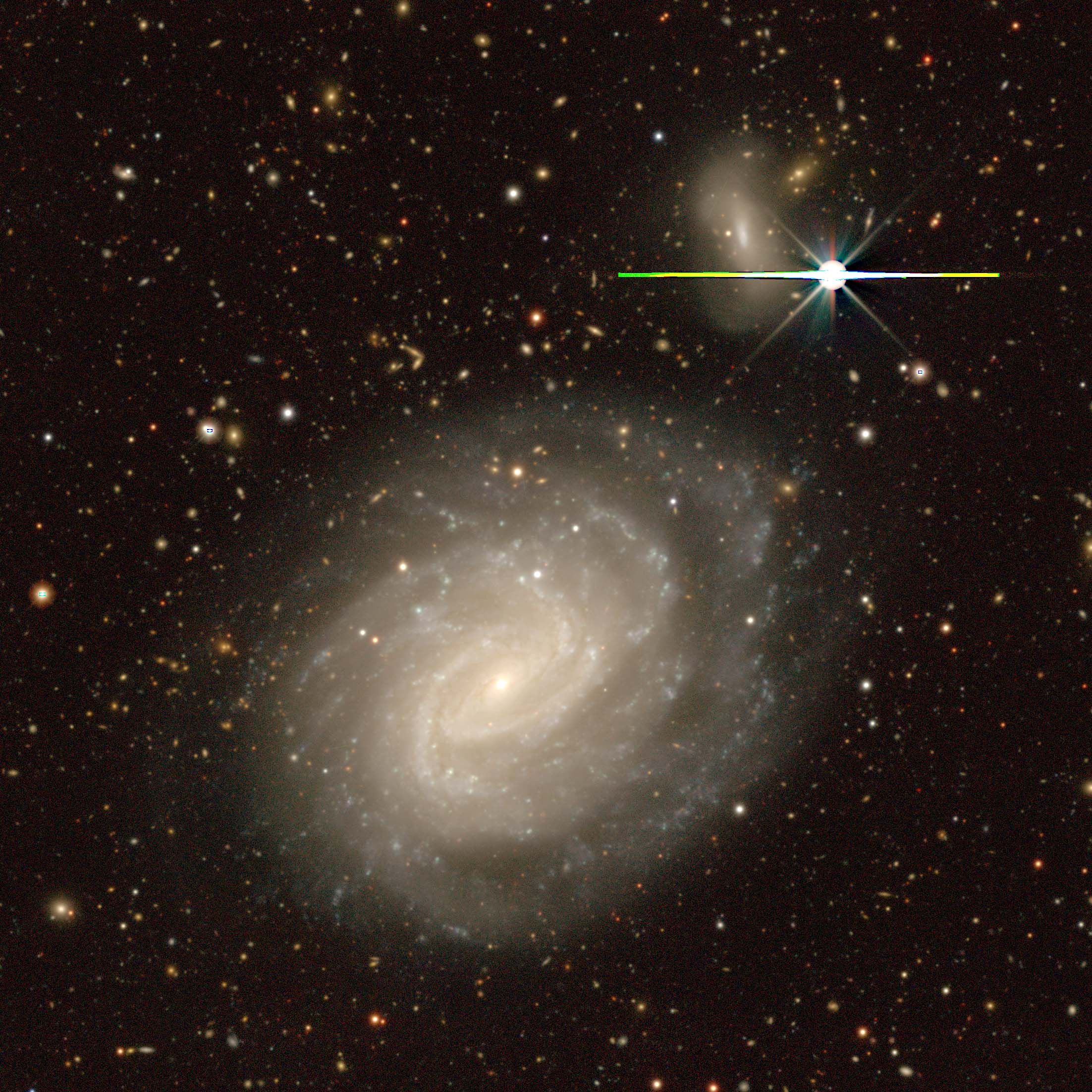
NGC 1187 and ESO 480-20 (top, next to the star HD 18967), imaged by legacy surveys
