= Huntington Center, Vermont =

Census-designated place in Vermont, United States

- Census-designated place
- Location within Vermont Location within the United States
- Coordinates: 44°17′33″N 72°57′54″W
- Country: United States
- State: Vermont
- County: Chittenden
- Town: Huntington

Area
  - Total: 0.302 sq mi (0.782 km^{2})
  - Land: 0.300 sq mi (0.776 km^{2})
  - Water: 0.0023 sq mi (0.006 km^{2})
- Elevation: 702 ft (214 m)
- Time zone: UTC-5 (Eastern (EST))
  - Summer (DST): UTC-4 (EDT)
- ZIP Code: 05462 (Huntington)
- Area code: 802
- FIPS code: 50-34675
- GNIS feature ID: 2807136

Huntington Center is an unincorporated village and census-designated place (CDP) in the town of Huntington, Chittenden County, Vermont, United States. It was first listed as a CDP prior to the 2020 census. As of the 2020 census, Huntington Center had a population of 156.

== Geography ==
The village is in southeastern Chittenden County, near the western border of the town of Huntington, in the valley of the Huntington River, a north-flowing tributary of the Winooski River. It is 2.5 miles (4.0 km) south of Huntington village and 3.5 miles (5.6 km) north of Hanksville. Burlington is 23 miles (37 km) to the northwest. 4,083-foot (1,244 m) Camel's Hump rises 4 miles (6 km) to the northeast on the crest of the Green Mountains.
