= Vermont Institute of Natural Science =

US non-profit environmental education organization

Coordinates: 43°38′35.3″N 72°24′42.1″W

- Abbreviation: VINS
- Type: Non-profit environmental education organization
- Headquarters: Quechee, Vermont, United States
- Services: Avian rehabilitation, environmental education, teacher workshops, nature center with raptor exhibits and trails.
- Website: vinsweb.org

The Vermont Institute of Natural Science (VINS) is a non-profit environmental education organization based in Quechee, Vermont. Its mission is to motivate individuals and communities to care for the environment through education, research, and avian wildlife rehabilitation.

== Avian rehabilitation ==
One role VINS takes on is to bring birds back to health and release them back to the wild. VINS has federal and state permits that allow it to be able to have birds that can be used in educational programs. The teaching birds range from a great horned owl to a peregrine falcon. The birds of prey, or raptors, used for teaching cannot be released into the wild because they would not survive. The reasons these birds would not survive can vary, perhaps the loss of an eye or because they were raised by people. VINS also has exhibit birds that are not used for educational programs; these injured birds live in outdoor enclosures. VINS has 18 enclosures that contain dozens of birds of prey.

VINS also holds several professional development workshops for teachers each year. At these workshops, teachers learn how to teach environmental citizenship and how to create curriculum around certain environmental issues. These workshops are not limited to birds, and can include a wide array of Vermont's wildlife, such as trout, bobcats, and vernal pools.

== VINS Nature Center ==
The VINS Nature Center in Quechee includes 17 raptor exhibits that house hawks, eagles, vultures, falcons, owls and ravens. The facility also has a nature shop, a classroom, several nature trails, a behind-the-scenes animal support facility, and a new exhibit consisting of frogs. There is also a flight simulator, where a visitor can feel as if one is flying. The center is located 1/3 mile west of the Quechee Gorge along Vermont Route 4.
