= Huntington, Vermont =

- Town
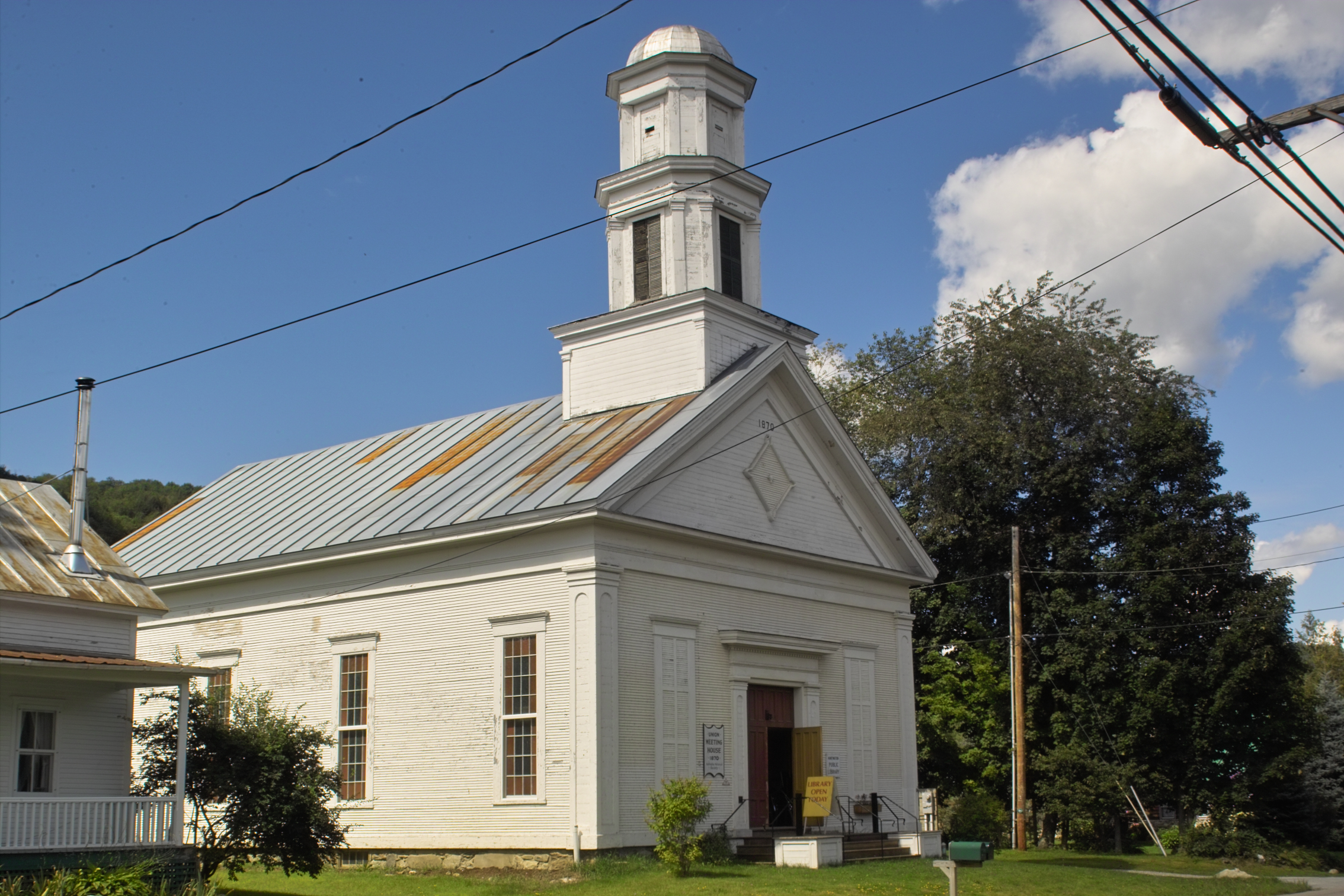
- Huntington Library

- Seal

- Location in Chittenden County and the state of Vermont.
- Coordinates: 44°17′24″N 72°57′48″W
- Country: United States
- State: Vermont
- County: Chittenden
- Communities: Huntington; Huntington Center; Hanksville

Government
  - Type: Town meeting

Area
  - Total: 38.0 sq mi (98.5 km^{2})
  - Land: 38.0 sq mi (98.3 km^{2})
  - Water: 0.12 sq mi (0.3 km^{2})
- Elevation: 830 ft (250 m)

Population (2020)
  - Total: 1,934
  - Density: 51/sq mi (19.7/km^{2})
- Time zone: UTC-5 (Eastern (EST))
  - Summer (DST): UTC-4 (EDT)
- ZIP codes: 05462 (Huntington); 05477 (Richmond)
- Area code: 802
- FIPS code: 50-34600
- GNIS feature ID: 1462121
- Website: huntingtonvt.org

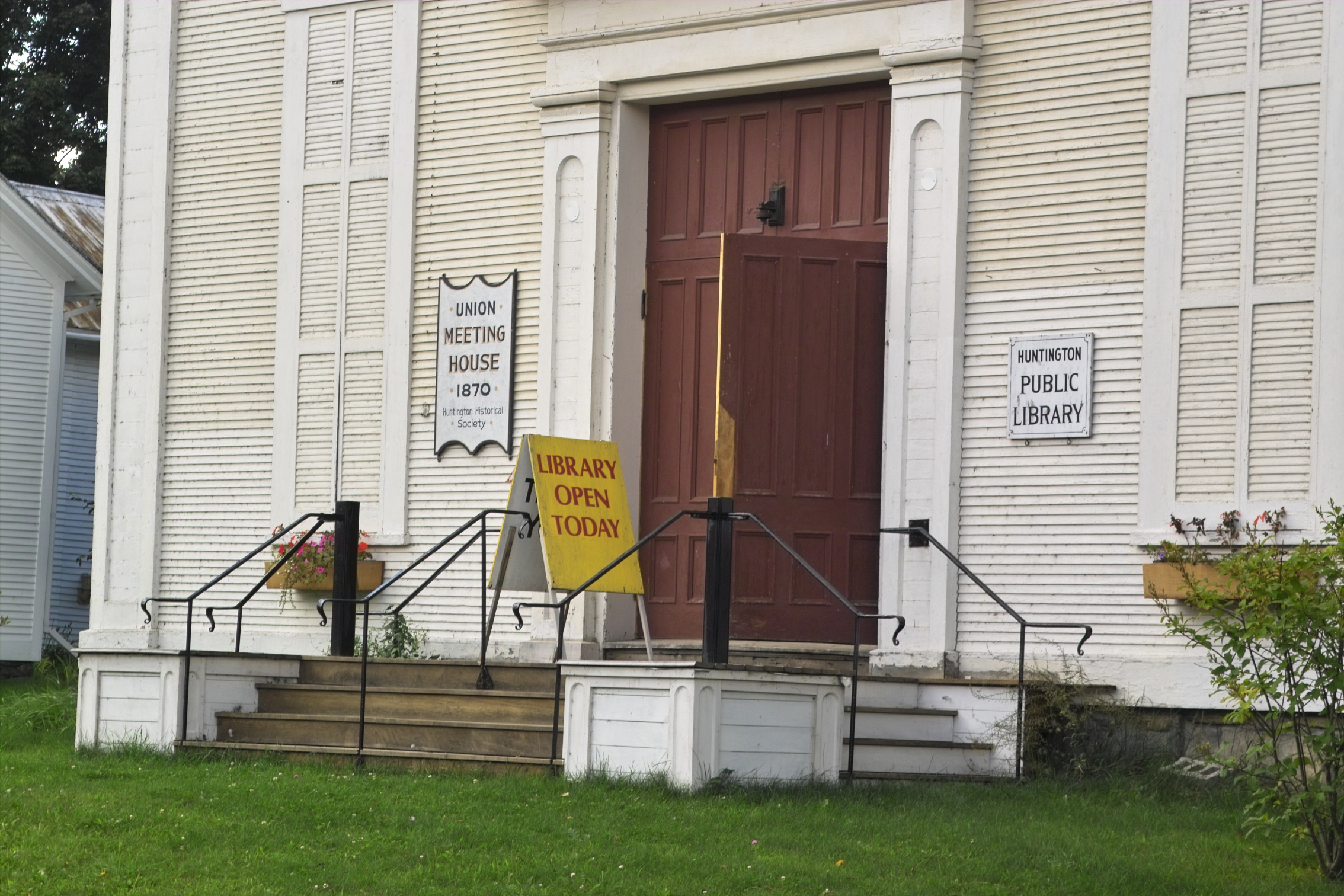
The small size of the town means that the library has limited hours of operation.

Huntington is a town in Chittenden County, Vermont, United States. The population was 1,938 at the 2020 census.

== History ==
The town was originally called "New Huntington", but the name was changed to "Huntington" in October 1795. It was named for landholders Josiah, Charles and Marmaduke Hunt.

The Huntington Lower Village Church was listed on the National Register of Historic Places in 1984. Its predecessor church building, constructed in 1839 and later used as the town hall and fire department, was established by Black Baptist preacher Charles Bowles in 1839.

== Geography ==
Huntington is in southeastern Chittenden County, bordered to the southwest by Addison County and to the east by Washington County. The town is located on the west side of the Green Mountains and is centered on the valley of the Huntington River, a north-flowing tributary of the Winooski River. The 4,083-foot (1,244 m) summit of Camel's Hump is in Huntington's northeast corner, on the town boundary with Duxbury.

According to the United States Census Bureau, the town of Huntington has a total area of 38.0 square miles (98.5 km^{2}), of which 38.0 square miles (98.3 km^{2}) is land and 0.1 square miles (0.3 km^{2}), or 0.26%, is water. The village of Huntington is in the northwest part of the town, Huntington Center is centrally located, and Hanksville is in the south. All three villages lie along the Huntington River.

== Demographics ==
As of the census of 2020, there were 1,934 people, 789 households, and 526 families residing in the town. The population density was 50.9 people per square mile (19.7/km^{2}). There were 853 housing units at an average density of 22.4 per square mile (8.6/km^{2}). The racial makeup of the town was 92.6% White, 0.57% African American, 0.36% Native American, 0.52% Asian, 0.05% Native Hawaiian, 0.98% from other races, and 4.96% from two or more races. Hispanic or Latino of any race were 1.96% of the population.

As of the 2022 American Community Survey, there were 824 occupied housing units, out of which 44.4% had children under the age of 18 living with them, 59.2% were married couples living together, 16.5% had a female householder with no husband present, and 27.4% were non-families. 22% of all households were made up of individuals, and 7.6% had someone living alone who was 65 years of age or older. The average household size was 2.24 and the average family size was 2.69.

The average age of the town's inhabitants has increased in the past few decades, up to 45.9, compared to the rest of county, which is 36.7. Only 21.3% are under the age of 20, 2.8% from 20 to 24, 26.4% from 25 to 44, 38% from 45 to 64, and 14.1% who were 65 years of age or older. The median age was 37 years. For every 100 females, there were 105.0 males. For every 100 females age 18 and over, there were 103.6 males. For every 100 females age 65 and over, there were 80 males.

The median income for a household in the town was $91,389, and the median income for a family was $110,083. The per capita income for the town was $49,045. About 4.8% of the population was below the poverty line, including 0.0% of those under age 18 and 3.1% of those age 65 or over.

== Climate ==
This climatic region is typified by large seasonal temperature differences, with warm to hot (and often humid) summers and cold (sometimes severely cold) winters. According to the Köppen Climate Classification system, Huntington has a humid continental climate, abbreviated "Dfb" on climate maps.

== Education ==
Mount Mansfield Modified Union School District operates the community's public schools.

When MMUUSD formed, Huntington residents had representation as the community sent its secondary students there, but Huntington continued to have its own elementary school district. Residents of Huntington resisted merging that district for a longer time, with four unsuccessful votes on merging into MMUUSD. At one point the state of Vermont passed Act 46 that obligated school districts to merge. The Huntington School District sued the state government to try to stop the merger. In 2018 the Huntington district filed its third lawsuit against mergers. On June 6, 2019, the vote to merge Huntington into Mount Mansfield succeeded on a 450–191 basis; the Chittenden East Supervisory Union dissolved as a result.

== Notable people ==
- Gregory C. Knight, Adjutant general of the Vermont National Guard beginning in March 2019
- Emerson H. Liscum, U.S. Army officer
- Bob Spear, naturalist, birdwatcher, founder of the Birds of Vermont Museum
- Damon Wayans Jr., actor, comedian, and writer
