= National Register of Historic Places listings in Windsor County, Vermont =

Location of Windsor County in Vermont

The National Register of Historic Places is a United States federal official list of places and sites considered worthy of preservation. In Windsor County, Vermont, there are 136 properties and districts listed on the National Register, including 4 National Historic Landmarks.

This National Park Service list is complete through NPS recent listings posted May 1, 2026.

Contents: Counties in Vermont
Addison - Bennington - Caledonia - Chittenden - Essex - Franklin - Grand Isle - Lamoille - Orange - Orleans - Rutland - Washington - Windham - Windsor

== Current listings ==
	Name on the Register	Image	Date listed	Location	City or town	Description
1	Abbott Memorial Library	Abbott Memorial Library	January 6, 2015 (#14001141)	15 Library St. 43°39′54″N 72°32′21″W	Pomfret	
2	Advent Camp Meeting Grounds Historic District	Advent Camp Meeting Grounds Historic District	September 21, 2017 (#100001656)	150 Advent Ln. 43°39′40″N 72°18′42″W	Hartford	
3	Aiken Stand Complex	Aiken Stand Complex	January 27, 1983 (#83003229)	Jct Royalton Turnpike and Sayer Rd. 43°43′59″N 72°35′25″W	Barnard	
4	Ascutney Mill Dam Historic District	Ascutney Mill Dam Historic District	January 9, 2007 (#06001236)	55 and 57 Ascutney St. 43°28′45″N 72°23′44″W	Windsor	
5	Ascutney State Park	Ascutney State Park	June 14, 2002 (#02000664)	1826 Back Mountain Rd. 43°26′34″N 72°26′08″W	Windsor	
6	Atherton Farmstead	Atherton Farmstead	March 1, 2002 (#02000119)	31 Greenbush Rd. 43°24′52″N 72°32′49″W	Cavendish	
7	Beaver Meadow School	Beaver Meadow School	June 7, 2013 (#13000374)	246 Chapel Hill Rd. 43°45′50″N 72°22′19″W	Norwich	
8	Beaver Meadow Union Chapel	Beaver Meadow Union Chapel	March 9, 1995 (#95000185)	Northern side of Beaver Meadow Road; 43°45′52″N 72°22′27″W	Norwich	
9	Best's Covered Bridge	Best's Covered Bridge	July 2, 1973 (#73000210)	About 8 mi (13 km) west of Windsor off Vermont Route 44; 43°27′19″N 72°30′58″W	West Windsor	
10	Bethel Village Historic District	Bethel Village Historic District	September 3, 1976 (#76000199)	Both sides of S. Main, Main, N. Main, and Church Sts. • Boundary increase (listed May 24, 1990): Vermont Route 107 across the White River and north to the Central Vermont Railway tracks 43°49′51″N 72°38′02″W	Bethel	
11	Black River Academy	Black River Academy	November 15, 1972 (#72000108)	High St. 43°23′47″N 72°41′45″W	Ludlow	
12	Augustus and Laura Blaisdell House	Augustus and Laura Blaisdell House	January 29, 2014 (#13001132)	517 Depot St. 43°16′02″N 72°35′24″W	Chester	
13	Bowers Covered Bridge	Bowers Covered Bridge	August 28, 1973 (#73000211)	Bible Hill Road over Mill Creek; 43°27′42″N 72°29′29″W	West Windsor	Washed off abutments by Hurricane Irene; rebuilt in 2012.
14	Theron Boyd Homestead	Theron Boyd Homestead	May 20, 1993 (#93000381)	Town Highway 6; 43°39′08″N 72°26′46″W	Hartford	
15	Bridge 15	Bridge 15	August 19, 2008 (#08000792)	F.A.S. Highway 177; 43°46′55″N 72°27′36″W	Sharon	
16	Bridgewater Corners Bridge	Bridgewater Corners Bridge	October 29, 1992 (#92001525)	Vermont Route 100A over the Ottauquechee River; 43°35′12″N 72°39′25″W	Bridgewater	
17	Bridgewater Village School	Bridgewater Village School	June 16, 2022 (#100007830)	76 Southgate Loop; 43°35′17″N 72°37′27″W	Bridgewater	Built and operated from 1914 - 2015. Now the Bridgewater Community Center.
18	Bridgewater Woolen Mill	Bridgewater Woolen Mill	July 6, 1976 (#76002240)	U.S. Route 4; 43°35′13″N 72°37′16″W	Bridgewater	
19	Brigham Hill Historic District		March 5, 2020 (#100005025)	172, 185, 189 & 211 Brigham Hill Rd. 43°44′01″N 72°19′18″W	Norwich	
20	Brook Farm	Brook Farm	July 22, 1993 (#93000676)	Twenty Mile Stream Rd. northwest of Cavendish; 43°26′30″N 72°39′20″W	Cavendish	
21	Twing Buckman House	Twing Buckman House	April 4, 1996 (#96000385)	U.S. Route 5, approximately 0.25 miles (0.40 km) north of Chase Island; 43°28′14″N 72°23′26″W	Windsor	
22	Cavendish Universalist Church	Cavendish Universalist Church	April 24, 1973 (#73000252)	Vermont Route 131; 43°23′05″N 72°36′22″W	Cavendish	
23	Chester Village Historic District	Chester Village Historic District	August 8, 1985 (#85001739)	Roughly bounded by Lovers Lane Brook, Maple St., the Williams River, Middle Branch, and Lovers Lane; 43°15′54″N 72°36′04″W	Chester	
24	Christian Street Rural Historic District	Christian Street Rural Historic District	December 5, 2003 (#03001248)	Christian St., Hemlock Ridge Dr., and Jericho St. 43°41′29″N 72°19′12″W	Hartford	
25	Congregational Church of Ludlow	Congregational Church of Ludlow	January 28, 2004 (#03001541)	48 Pleasant St. 43°23′43″N 72°41′50″W	Ludlow	
26	Coolidge State Park	Coolidge State Park	March 29, 2002 (#02000281)	855 Coolidge State Park Rd. 43°33′08″N 72°41′39″W	Plymouth	
27	Calvin Coolidge Homestead District	Calvin Coolidge Homestead District	October 15, 1966 (#66000794)	Off Vermont Route 100A; 43°32′14″N 72°43′28″W	Plymouth Notch	President Calvin Coolidge's birthplace and family home.
28	Cornish-Windsor Covered Bridge	Cornish-Windsor Covered Bridge	November 21, 1976 (#76000135)	West of Cornish City; 43°28′26″N 72°23′01″W	Windsor	Extends into Cornish in Sullivan County, New Hampshire
29	Rev. George Daman House	Rev. George Daman House	June 22, 1989 (#89000759)	Wyman Ln. 43°36′29″N 72°33′42″W	Woodstock	
30	Damon Hall	Damon Hall	June 2, 1988 (#88000654)	U.S. Route 5 and Vermont Route 12; 43°32′29″N 72°24′01″W	Hartland	
31	Demers Avenue Historic District	Demers Avenue Historic District	December 1, 2025 (#100012107)	41, 43, 53, 65, 71, 83 Demers Avenue; 43°39′37″N 72°18′47″W	Hartford	
32	Dewey House	Dewey House	August 27, 1999 (#99001051)	173 Deweys Mills Rd. 43°38′30″N 72°24′19″W	Hartford	
33	Wentworth and Diana Eldredge House		February 5, 2021 (#100006133)	Address Restricted	Norwich	
34	Ezekiel Emerson Farm	Ezekiel Emerson Farm	November 29, 2001 (#01001284)	Vermont Route 73; 43°51′23″N 72°49′21″W	Rochester	
35	Eureka Schoolhouse	Eureka Schoolhouse	March 11, 1971 (#71000074)	470 Charlestown Rd. 43°16′12″N 72°26′52″W	Goulds Mill	
36	Joseph Fessenden House	Joseph Fessenden House	September 6, 2002 (#02000953)	58 Bridge St. 43°48′54″N 72°32′50″W	Royalton	
37	Fire District No. 2 Firehouse	Fire District No. 2 Firehouse	March 16, 2020 (#100005063)	716 Depot St. 43°16′12″N 72°35′22″W	Chester	
38	Fletcher Memorial Library	Fletcher Memorial Library	September 9, 2024 (#100010791)	88 Main Street; 43°23′48″N 72°41′41″W	Ludlow	
39	Fletcher-Fullerton Farm	Fletcher-Fullerton Farm	November 4, 2004 (#04001215)	1390 Fletcher Schoolhouse Road; 43°34′08″N 72°33′35″W	Woodstock	
40	Fowler-Steele House	Fowler-Steele House	June 17, 1982 (#82001710)	N. Main St. 43°29′24″N 72°23′10″W	Windsor	
41	Fox Stand	Fox Stand	July 23, 2015 (#15000477)	5615 VT 14; 43°49′24″N 72°33′52″W	Royalton	
42	Gate of the Hills	Gate of the Hills	November 18, 1991 (#91001648)	Junction of North and Royalton Hill Rds. 43°49′15″N 72°37′50″W	Bethel	
43	Daniel Gay House	Daniel Gay House	January 9, 1978 (#78000252)	Vermont Route 107; 43°46′42″N 72°41′52″W	Stockbridge	Now the Belcher Library
44	Gilbert's Hill	Gilbert's Hill	March 18, 2019 (#100003524)	1362 Barnard Rd. 43°38′50″N 72°32′21″W	Woodstock	
45	Gilead Brook Bridge	Gilead Brook Bridge	October 11, 1990 (#90001492)	Vermont Route 12 over Gilead Brook; 43°52′25″N 72°38′52″W	Bethel	
46	Glimmerstone	Glimmerstone	November 14, 1978 (#78000253)	Vermont Route 131; 43°22′58″N 72°36′48″W	Cavendish	
47	Goodrich Four Corners Historic District		June 26, 2019 (#100004111)	929-987 Union Village, 18 Pattrell & 694 Goodrich Four Corners Rds. 43°45′19″N 72°16′43″W	Norwich	
48	Gould's Mill Bridge	Gould's Mill Bridge	February 1, 2006 (#05001589)	Town Hwy. 66 (Paddock Rd.) over the Black River; 43°16′22″N 72°27′16″W	Springfield	
49	Greenwood House	Greenwood House	October 31, 1985 (#85003442)	Vermont Route 103; 43°15′28″N 72°35′14″W	Chester	
50	Harrington House	Harrington House	March 16, 1983 (#83003230)	River St. and Vermont Route 107; 43°49′17″N 72°37′56″W	Bethel	
51	Hartford Library	Hartford Library	December 9, 1994 (#94001447)	1587 Maple St. 43°39′41″N 72°20′35″W	Hartford	
52	Hartford Village Historic District	Hartford Village Historic District	September 3, 1998 (#98001153)	Roughly along Hartford Main, Summer and Christian Sts. 43°39′45″N 72°20′23″W	Hartford	
53	Hartness House	Hartness House	December 20, 1978 (#78000254)	30 Orchard St. 43°18′05″N 72°28′39″W	Springfield	
54	Historic Crown Point Road	Historic Crown Point Road	December 2, 1974 (#74000270)	Off Vermont Route 131; 43°23′29″N 72°30′12″W	Weathersfield	The Crown Point Road spanned about a hundred miles when originally built.
55	Indian Stones	Indian Stones	November 20, 1974 (#74000356)	Vermont Route 106; 43°26′47″N 72°32′07″W	Reading	
56	Iron Bridge at Howard Hill Road	Iron Bridge at Howard Hill Road	September 9, 1982 (#82001711)	Howard Hill Rd. and Vermont Route 131; 43°24′16″N 72°34′32″W	Cavendish	The original 1890 structure was replaced in 2007 by the bridge in photo.
57	Jeffrey House	Jeffrey House	June 13, 1974 (#74000271)	North St. 43°16′44″N 72°35′51″W	Chester	
58	Jericho Rural Historic District	Jericho Rural Historic District	November 8, 2001 (#01001228)	Jericho St., Jericho Rd., Wallace Rd., Sugartop Rd., Joshua Rd. 43°42′17″N 72°22′32″W	Hartford	
59	Wales N. Johnson House	Wales N. Johnson House	November 7, 1995 (#95001258)	43 Senior Ln. 43°36′44″N 72°33′00″W	Woodstock	Now the Jackson House Inn.
60	Jones Circle Historic District		September 11, 2025 (#100012214)	6,11,12,16,18,22,24,28,27,32,34 Jones Circle; 43°42′48″N 72°18′36″W	Norwich	
61	Juniper Hill Farm-Maxwell Evarts House	Juniper Hill Farm-Maxwell Evarts House	July 14, 1988 (#88001044)	Juniper Hill Rd. 43°29′31″N 72°23′45″W	Windsor	
62	Kendron Brook Bridge	Kendron Brook Bridge	August 27, 1992 (#92001037)	Town Highway 65 (Densmore Hill Road) over Kendron Brook; 43°34′53″N 72°30′55″W	Woodstock	
63	The King Farm	The King Farm	January 31, 1997 (#97000026)	King Farm Rd., 0.5 miles (0.80 km) north of its junction with U.S. Route 4; 43°37′23″N 72°32′41″W	Woodstock	
64	Lincoln Covered Bridge	Lincoln Covered Bridge	August 28, 1973 (#73000212)	Southwest of Woodstock off U.S. Route 4; 43°36′02″N 72°34′10″W	Woodstock	
65	Lockwood-Boynton House	Lockwood-Boynton House	May 4, 1982 (#82001712)	1 School St. 43°19′59″N 72°31′36″W	North Springfield	
66	Locust Creek House Complex	Locust Creek House Complex	December 10, 1982 (#82001766)	Vermont Route 12; 43°48′32″N 72°39′04″W	Bethel	
67	Luce Farm		December 6, 2021 (#100007219)	170 Luce Rd. 43°48′22″N 72°43′45″W	Stockbridge	
68	Ludlow Graded School	Ludlow Graded School	November 29, 1979 (#79000276)	High St. 43°23′48″N 72°41′52″W	Ludlow	
69	Ludlow Village Historic District	Ludlow Village Historic District	January 9, 2007 (#06001235)	Main St., Depot St. 43°23′53″N 72°41′59″W	Ludlow	
70	Maple Hill Farm		March 16, 2020 (#100005062)	65 Maple Hill Rd. 43°44′06″N 72°18′04″W	Norwich	
71	Charles Marsh Law Office	Charles Marsh Law Office	December 9, 1994 (#94001449)	72 Pleasant St. 43°37′36″N 72°30′23″W	Woodstock	
72	George Perkins Marsh Boyhood Home	George Perkins Marsh Boyhood Home	June 11, 1967 (#67000023)	54 Elm St. 43°37′51″N 72°31′11″W	Woodstock	Boyhood home of George Perkins Marsh, an American diplomat and philologist, an early environmentalist. Now in the Marsh-Billings-Rockefeller National Historical Park.
73	Joseph and Daniel Marsh House	Joseph and Daniel Marsh House	September 3, 1998 (#98001149)	1119 Quechee Main Street; 43°38′55″N 72°24′27″W	Hartford	Now the Quechee Inn.
74	Marsh-Billings-Rockefeller National Historical Park	Marsh-Billings-Rockefeller National Historical Park	August 26, 1992 (#03000282)	Vermont Route 12; 43°38′00″N 72°31′16″W	Woodstock	Updated listing August 15, 2016.
75	Martin's Mill Covered Bridge	Martin's Mill Covered Bridge	August 28, 1973 (#73000213)	South of Hartland off U.S. Route 5; 43°31′56″N 72°23′47″W	Hartland	
76	McKenstry Manor	McKenstry Manor	December 1, 1978 (#78000255)	North of Bethel on Vermont Route 12; 43°52′00″N 72°39′11″W	Bethel	
77	Meeting House Farm		March 16, 2020 (#100005061)	128 Union Village Rd. 43°43′42″N 72°18′36″W	Norwich	
78	Owen Moon Farm	Owen Moon Farm	January 27, 1983 (#83003231)	South of South Woodstock off Vermont Route 106; 43°33′18″N 72°31′59″W	South Woodstock	
79	Gen. Lewis R. Morris House	Gen. Lewis R. Morris House	June 25, 1992 (#92000813)	456 Old Connecticut River Rd. 43°17′23″N 72°24′37″W	Springfield	
80	NAMCO Block	NAMCO Block	November 14, 1991 (#91001615)	1-17 Union St. 43°28′32″N 72°23′23″W	Windsor	
81	Norwich Mid-Century Modern Historic District	Norwich Mid-Century Modern Historic District	June 25, 2018 (#100002604)	Parts of Hopson, Pine Tree & Spring Pond Rds. 43°42′42″N 72°19′03″W	Norwich	
82	Norwich Village Historic District	Norwich Village Historic District	January 3, 1991 (#90002116)	Main St. from south of Elm St. to Turnpike Rd. and adjacent portions of Elm, Church, Mechanic, Hazen and Cliff Sts. 43°42′56″N 72°18′38″W	Norwich	
83	Old Christ Church	Old Christ Church	March 6, 2008 (#08000159)	Junction of Vermont Route 12 and Gilead Brook Rd. 43°52′30″N 72°38′51″W	Bethel	
84	Old Constitution House	Old Constitution House	March 11, 1971 (#71000075)	16 N. Main St. 43°29′03″N 72°23′08″W	Windsor	
85	Old South Church	Old South Church	March 29, 2024 (#100010130)	146 Main St. 43°28′40″N 72°23′15″W	Windsor	
86	Ottauquechee River Bridge	Ottauquechee River Bridge	October 11, 1990 (#90001491)	U.S. Route 5 over the Ottauquechee River; 43°36′09″N 72°21′17″W	Hartland	
87	Park Street School	Park Street School	October 7, 2020 (#100005653)	60 Park St. 43°17′57″N 72°29′07″W	Springfield	
88	Parker Hill Rural Historic District	Parker Hill Rural Historic District	May 20, 1993 (#93000431)	Parker Hill and Lower Parker Hill Rds. 43°13′25″N 72°28′46″W	Springfield	Extends into Windham County
89	Aaron Jr. and Susan Parker Farm	Aaron Jr. and Susan Parker Farm	September 24, 2014 (#14000405)	1715 Brook Road; 43°25′11″N 72°36′36″W	Cavendish	
90	Plymouth Historic District	Plymouth Historic District	December 12, 1970 (#70000084)	Vermont Route 100A; 43°32′30″N 72°42′51″W	Plymouth	
91	Pollard Block	Pollard Block	August 28, 2008 (#08000855)	7 Depot St. 43°22′57″N 72°38′18″W	Cavendish	
92	Progressive Market	Progressive Market	July 10, 1995 (#95000814)	63 S. Main St. 43°38′46″N 72°19′09″W	Hartford	
93	Quechee Gorge Bridge	Quechee Gorge Bridge	October 11, 1990 (#90001490)	U.S. Route 4 over Quechee Gorge; 43°38′16″N 72°24′32″W	Hartford	
94	Quechee Historic Mill District	Quechee Historic Mill District	July 3, 1997 (#97000747)	Roughly along High, Quechee Main, River, and School Sts., and River, Waterman Hill, Deweys Mill, and Cemetery Rds. 43°38′50″N 72°25′07″W	Hartford	
95	Isaac M. Raymond Farm	Isaac M. Raymond Farm	April 1, 1993 (#93000242)	Junction of Woodstock Town Highways 95 and 18; 43°38′57″N 72°33′59″W	Woodstock	Now called Uphill Farm.
96	Reading Town Hall	Reading Town Hall	March 7, 1996 (#96000252)	Junction of Vermont Route 106 and Pleasant St. 43°27′20″N 72°32′16″W	Reading	
97	Robbins and Lawrence Armory and Machine Shop	Robbins and Lawrence Armory and Machine Shop	November 13, 1966 (#66000796)	S. Main St. 43°28′29″N 72°23′23″W	Windsor	Erected in 1846, an excellent example of 19th century American industrial architecture, and a site of the development of precision machinery.
98	Root School	Root School	June 10, 2013 (#13000375)	987 Union Village Rd. 43°45′22″N 72°16′37″W	Norwich	
99	Royalton Mill Complex	Royalton Mill Complex	February 3, 1983 (#83003232)	North of South Royalton on Town Rd. 12; 43°49′54″N 72°30′56″W	South Royalton	
100	Saddlebow Farm	Saddlebow Farm	November 14, 2002 (#02001345)	2477 Gold Coast Rd. 43°36′54″N 72°37′19″W	Bridgewater	
101	St. Pauls's Episcopal Church	St. Pauls's Episcopal Church	March 2, 2001 (#01000214)	Junction of Bridge St. and Vermont Route 14; 43°48′55″N 72°32′48″W	Royalton	
102	Simons' Inn	Simons' Inn	March 2, 1979 (#79000233)	Southwest of Andover on Vermont Route 11; 43°15′28″N 72°43′01″W	Andover	
103	Slayton-Morgan Historic District		June 24, 2010 (#91001944)	Address Restricted	Woodstock	
104	South Reading Schoolhouse	South Reading Schoolhouse	February 3, 1983 (#83003233)	Felchville-Tyson's Corner Rd. 43°28′34″N 72°35′41″W	South Reading	
105	South Royalton Historic District	South Royalton Historic District	September 3, 1976 (#76000200)	East of Royalton on Vermont Route 14; 43°49′17″N 72°31′15″W	South Royalton	
106	South Woodstock Village Historic District	South Woodstock Village Historic District	August 12, 1982 (#82001713)	Both sides of Vermont Route 106, Town Highway 61, and Church Hill Rd. 43°33′48″N 72°31′57″W	Woodstock	
107	Southview Housing Historic District	Southview Housing Historic District	November 8, 2007 (#07001171)	1-107 Stanley Rd. 43°17′06″N 72°28′35″W	Springfield	
108	Spaulding Bridge	Spaulding Bridge	January 11, 2006 (#05001522)	Mill St. 43°22′57″N 72°36′31″W	Cavendish	
109	Zachariah Spaulding Farm	Zachariah Spaulding Farm	November 4, 1993 (#93001175)	Town Highway 38 south of the Ludlow town center 43°22′53″N 72°41′29″W	Ludlow	
110	Spencer Hollow School	Spencer Hollow School	September 17, 2012 (#12000803)	50 Spencer Hollow Rd. 43°17′51″N 72°25′52″W	Springfield	
111	Springfield Downtown Historic District	Springfield Downtown Historic District	August 11, 1983 (#83003234)	Roughly bounded by the Black River and Mineral, Pearl, Main, and Valley Sts. • Boundary increase (listed September 11, 1986): Roughly the Brookline Apartments on Wall St., Park St., and along the Black River; 43°18′04″N 72°29′05″W	Springfield	
112	Stellafane Observatory	Stellafane Observatory	November 7, 1977 (#77000107)	South of North Springfield off Breezy Hill Rd. 43°16′41″N 72°31′10″W	North Springfield	Contains original clubhouse of the Springfield Telescope Makers, Inc. (1924), and the first large optical telescope (1930) built and owned by that kind of amateur society.
113	Stockbridge Common Historic District	Stockbridge Common Historic District	May 24, 1990 (#90000800)	Area around Stockbridge Common, including Maplewood Cemetery; 43°47′12″N 72°45′19″W	Stockbridge	
114	Stockbridge Four Corners Bridge	Stockbridge Four Corners Bridge	November 14, 1991 (#91001611)	Vermont Route 100 over the White River; 43°46′56″N 72°45′30″W	Stockbridge	Demolished 2009 and replaced by modern bridge.
115	Walter and Sylvia Stockmayer House		September 23, 2020 (#100005643)	48 Overlook Dr. 43°43′37″N 72°18′15″W	Norwich	
116	Stone Village Historic District	Stone Village Historic District	May 17, 1974 (#74000329)	Both sides of Vermont Route 103; 43°16′24″N 72°35′35″W	Chester	
117	Jedediah Strong II House	Jedediah Strong II House	August 13, 1974 (#74000272)	Quechee Main St. and Dewey's Mills Rd. 43°38′44″N 72°24′02″W	Hartford	
118	David Sumner House	David Sumner House	March 2, 1989 (#89000027)	U.S. Route 5; 43°32′24″N 72°23′56″W	Hartland	
119	Taftsville Covered Bridge	Taftsville Covered Bridge	August 28, 1973 (#73000214)	East of Woodstock off U.S. Route 4; 43°38′23″N 72°28′05″W	Woodstock	
120	Taftsville Historic District	Taftsville Historic District	August 2, 2001 (#01000824)	Portions of U.S. Route 4, Upper River Rd., Quechee Main St., all Butternut Ln., Happy Valley Rd., Sugar Hill Rd. 43°37′46″N 72°28′26″W	Hartford	
121	Terraces Historic District	Terraces Historic District	July 6, 2012 (#12000410)	22-60 Mapelwood Terr., 2-364 Fairview Terr., 12-249 Hillcrest Terr., 82, 176 Forest Hills Ave. 43°39′01″N 72°19′30″W	Hartford	
122	Upper Falls Covered Bridge	Upper Falls Covered Bridge	August 28, 1973 (#73000215)	North of Perkinsville off Vermont Route 131; 43°23′55″N 72°31′21″W	Perkinsville	
123	Weathersfield Center Historic District	Weathersfield Center Historic District	June 30, 1980 (#80000345)	Center Rd. 43°22′43″N 72°28′05″W	Weathersfield Center	
124	West Hartford Bridge	West Hartford Bridge	October 29, 1992 (#92001524)	Town Highway 14 at Vermont Route 14 over the White River; 43°42′44″N 72°25′06″W	Hartford	Truss bridge, replaced by modern bridge in 2006.
125	West Hartford Village Historic District	West Hartford Village Historic District	December 15, 2004 (#04001368)	Vermont Route 14, Harper Savage Ln., Tigertown Rd., and Stetson Rd. 43°42′59″N 72°24′58″W	Hartford	
126	West Woodstock Bridge	West Woodstock Bridge	August 27, 1992 (#92001038)	Town Highway 50 over the Ottauquechee River; 43°36′51″N 72°32′36″W	West Woodstock	
127	Weston Village Historic District	Weston Village Historic District	August 29, 1985 (#85001934)	Main, Park, and School Sts., Lawrence Hill, Landgrove, and Trout Club Rds., Mill Lane, and Chester Mountain Rd. 43°17′30″N 72°47′40″W	Weston	
128	White River Junction Historic District	White River Junction Historic District	August 22, 1980 (#80000390)	Railroad Row, Main, Currier, Bridge, and Gates Sts.; also N. Main St., S. Main St. Bridge St., Gates St., and Church St.; also Currier St. & Maple St. 43°38′53″N 72°19′09″W	Hartford	Second and third address lists represent boundary increases approved December 20, 2002 and December 10, 2019
129	Wilder Village Historic District	Wilder Village Historic District	November 22, 1999 (#99001396)	Portions of Norwich, Passumpsic, and Horseshoe Aves., Chestnut, Gillette, Fern, Hawthorn, Locust and Division Sts. 43°40′30″N 72°18′31″W	Hartford	
130	John Wilder House	John Wilder House	November 10, 1983 (#83004231)	Lawrence Hill Rd. 43°17′32″N 72°47′43″W	Weston	
131	Wilgus State Park	Wilgus State Park	March 29, 2002 (#02000282)	3985 U.S. Route 5; 43°23′27″N 72°24′38″W	Weathersfield	
132	Willard Covered Bridge	Willard Covered Bridge	August 28, 1973 (#73000216)	Mill Rd. across the Ottauquechee River; 43°35′37″N 72°21′01″W	Hartland	
133	Windsor House	Windsor House	December 29, 1971 (#71000060)	N. Main St., north of the junction of Main and State Sts. 43°28′51″N 72°23′11″W	Windsor	
134	Windsor Village Historic District	Windsor Village Historic District	April 23, 1975 (#75000212)	Area centered around Main, Depot Ave., State St., and Court Sq. • Boundary increase (listed July 25, 1997, refnum 97000828): Along Phelps Ct. and State St. • Boundary increase (listed December 1, 2014, refnum 14001036): Along Main & State Sts., Village Green, Depot Ave., Connecticut R., Paradise Park; 43°28′50″N 72°23′13″W	Windsor	Second and third set of addresses represents boundary increases
135	Woodstock Village Historic District	Woodstock Village Historic District	January 22, 1973 (#73000274)	Along the Ottauquechee River, roughly inclusive of Maple, South, River, Prospect, and Pleasant Sts., College Hill Rd., and Mountain Ave. 43°37′33″N 72°30′59″W	Woodstock	Boundary changes were approved on August 6, 2021
136	Woodstock Warren Through Truss Bridge	Woodstock Warren Through Truss Bridge	August 18, 1992 (#92000987)	Town Highway 24 across the Ottauquechee River; 43°36′01″N 72°35′22″W	Woodstock	Swept away by Hurricane Irene in August 2011

== See also ==
- List of National Historic Landmarks in Vermont
- National Register of Historic Places listings in Vermont
