= Abbott Memorial Library =

Abbott Memorial Library may refer to;

- Abbott Memorial Library (Dexter, Maine), a public library
- Abbott Memorial Library (Pomfret, Vermont), a public library
