= Twing Buckman House =

Historic house in Vermont, United States

- U.S. National Register of Historic Places
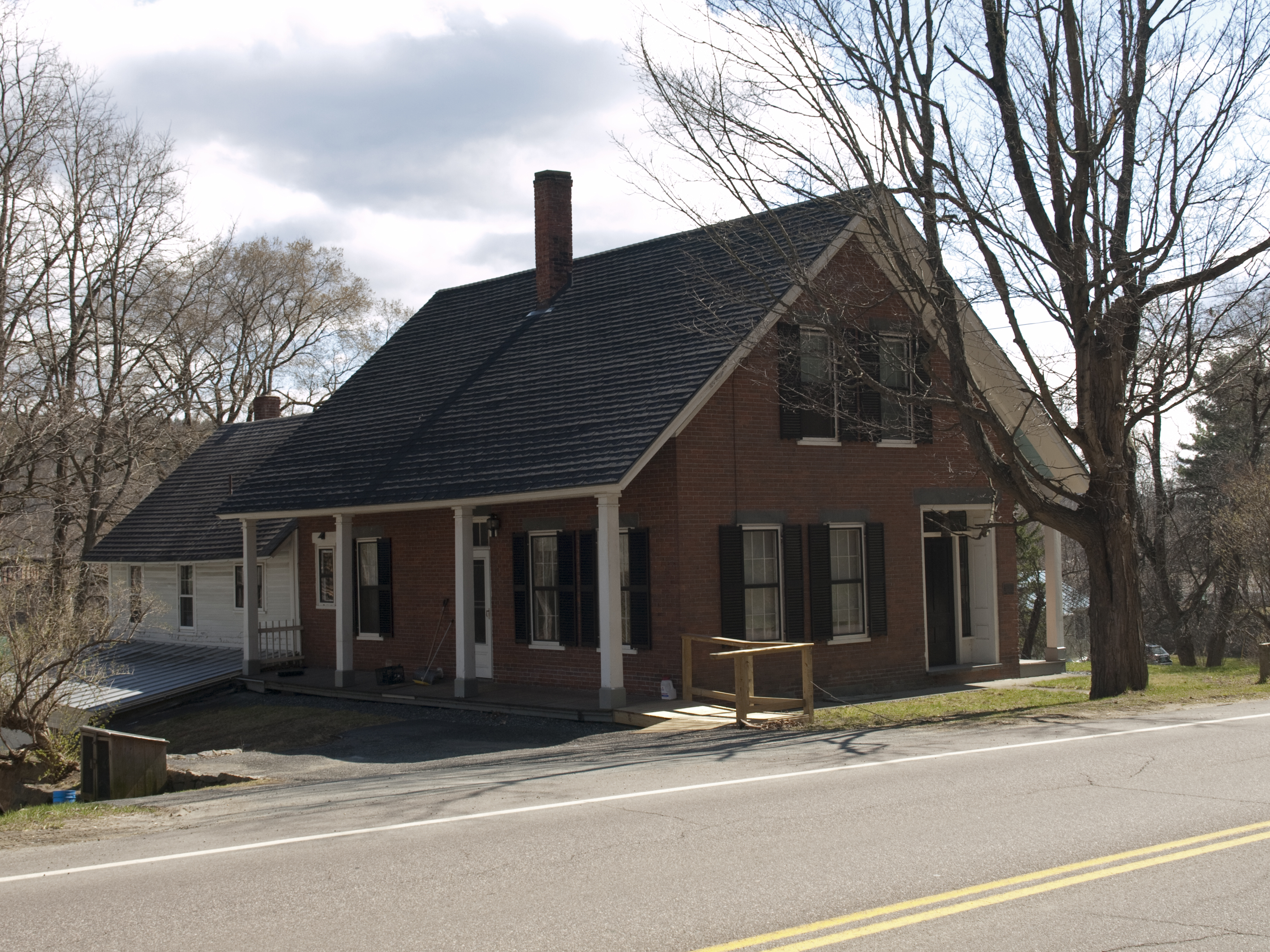

- Location within Vermont Location within the United States
- Location: US 5, approximately 0.25 miles (0.40 km) N of Chase Island, Windsor, Vermont
- Coordinates: 43°28′14″N 72°23′26″W
- Area: 1.5 acres (0.61 ha)
- Built: 1840
- Architectural style: Mid-19th Century
- NRHP reference No.: 96000385
- Added to NRHP: April 4, 1996

The Twing Bucknam House is a historic house on United States Route 5 south of the main village of Windsor, Vermont. Built about 1840, it is a modest brick house with a combination of features that is unique to the state and the surrounding communities. It was listed on the National Register of Historic Places in 1996.

== Description and history ==
The Twing Bucknam House stands on the east side of US 5, about 0.25 miles (0.40 km) south of the southern edge of Windsor village. It is set on a built-out terrace that drops off toward the Connecticut River to the east. A railroad bridge crosses the river east of the house. The house has two parts: the street-facing front block is a 1 1/2-story brick-veneered post-and-beam structure, with a front-facing gable roof and end chimneys, while the rear section, built below the terrace, is a 2 1/2-story mid-20th century wood-frame structure with a garage at the ground level. The roof of the front section has elongated eaves, extending over side porches supported by square columns. The front facade is three bays wide, with a recessed entrance in the right bay. The recess has paneled sides, and the door is flanked by sidelight windows. The north and south sides each have secondary entrances, and the interior is arranged in a cruciform hall plan.

The house's construction date is uncertain. The 30-acre (12 ha) parcel it was originally part of includes the western abutment of the railroad bridge went through a series of owners, many of them absentee, during the 1830s and 1840s. The house was in all likelihood standing when Twing Bucknam purchased the property in 1847. The house's builder and designer are unknown, but the extended eaves and side porches are extremely rare features, unknown on other surviving period buildings in the state, or in the region across the river in New Hampshire.

== See also ==
- National Register of Historic Places listings in Windsor County, Vermont
