= Theron Boyd Homestead =

Historic farm in Vermont, United States

- U.S. National Register of Historic Places
- U.S. Historic district
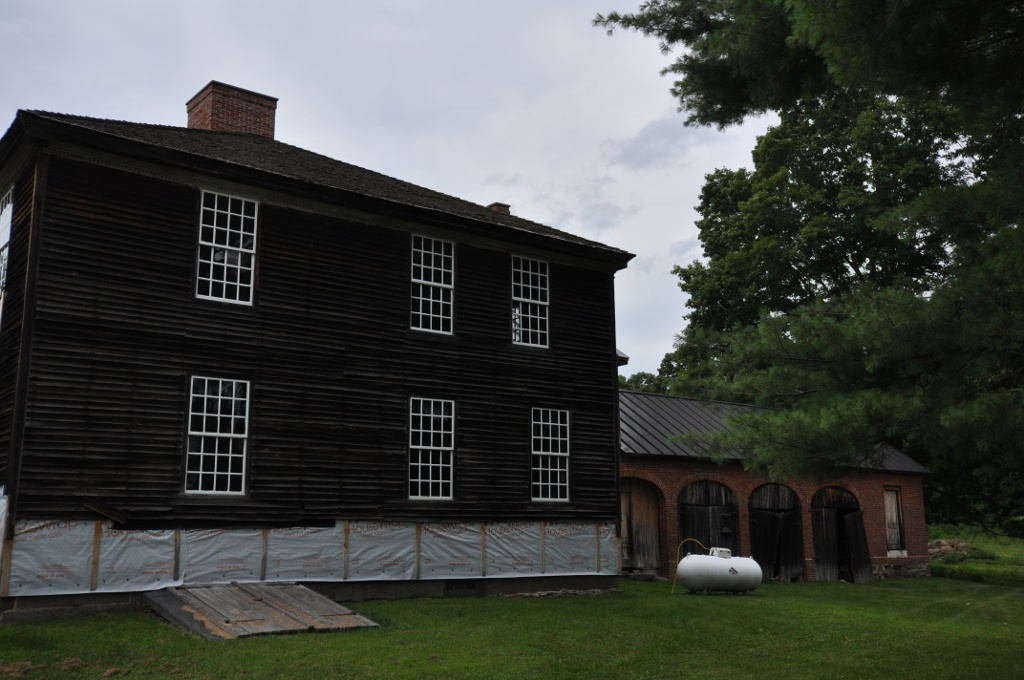

- Location within Vermont Location within the United States
- Location: Town Hwy. 6, Hartford, Vermont
- Coordinates: 43°39′8″N 72°26′46″W
- Area: 30.2 acres (12.2 ha)
- Built: 1786
- Architectural style: Federal
- MPS: Agricultural Resources of Vermont MPS
- NRHP reference No.: 93000381
- Added to NRHP: May 20, 1993

The Theron Boyd Homestead is a historic farm property on Hillside Road in Hartford, Vermont. The centerpieces of the 30-acre (12 ha) property are a house and barn, each built in 1786. The house, little altered since its construction, is one of the finest early Federal period houses in the state. The property is owned by the state, which has formulated plans to open it has a historic site. It was listed on the National Register of Historic Places in 1993.

== Description and history ==
The Theron Boyd Homestead is located in western Hartford, about 1 mile (1.6 km) of the village of Quechee. The property is bounded on the east by Quechee Main Street, the north by Wheelock Road, and Hillside Road runs east-west through the southern portion of the property. The property includes a combination of open fields and woodlands, with the main cluster of buildings found on either side of Hillside Road. The barn is set close the south side of the street; it is a five-bay gable-roofed wooden structure, finished in vertical board siding. The house stands a short way northwest of the barn; it is a two-story structure, with a hip roof, large central chimney, clapboard siding, and a rubblestone foundation capped by dressed fieldstones. The street-facing front facade is five bays wide, with an enlarged center bay flanked by sash windows in the more closely spaced bays on the sides. The center entrance is flanked by pilasters and topped by a four-light transom window and cornice. The building corners have narrow Federal style beaded molding. The interior has many well-preserved period features, including doors with original hardware, wooden panels, early 19th-century wallpaper, and even instances of marbleized paint on some surfaces. Differences in construction material (principally nails) suggest that the interior was not completely finished until the early 19th century. A brick ell, dating to the early 1800s extends to the north of the main block. The house has never been fitted with modern utilities such as plumbing or electricity.

The house was built in 1786 for William Burtch, a prominent Hartford businessman whose father, Benjamin Burtch, first settled the land in 1766. From the early 1920s to about 1981, the 30-acre parcel now associated with the house was owned by Theron Boyd, who steadfastly resisted efforts to either subdivide the property or to modernize the house. In the 1980s, the property was transferred in portions to the Vermont Land Trust, which turned it over to the state in 1990. The state is in 2016 working to rehabilitate the house and prepare the property as a historic site.

== See also ==
- National Register of Historic Places listings in Windsor County, Vermont
