= Spencer Hollow School =

- U.S. National Register of Historic Places
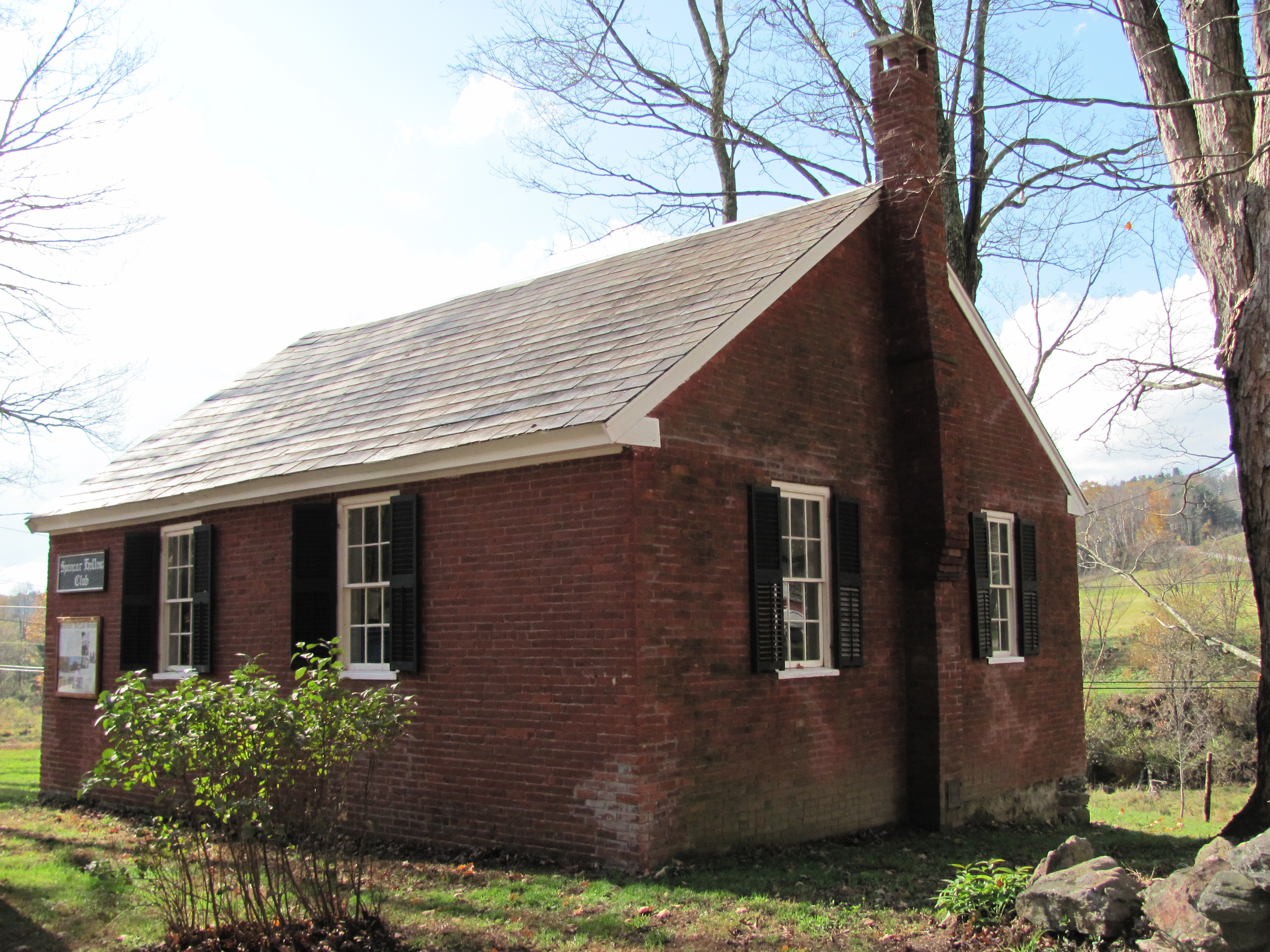

- Location within Vermont Location within the United States
- Location: 50 Spencer Hollow Rd., Springfield, Vermont
- Coordinates: 43°17′51″N 72°25′53″W
- Area: 0.25 acres (0.10 ha)
- Built: 1810
- NRHP reference No.: 12000803
- Added to NRHP: September 17, 2012

The Spencer Hollow School is a historic school building at 50 Spencer Hollow Road in Springfield, Vermont. Built about 1810, it is a fine local example of a district schoolhouse. It was used as a school until 1926, and as a clubhouse for a time thereafter. It was listed on the National Register of Historic Places in 2012.

== Description and history ==
The Spencer Hollow School stands in a rural area of eastern Springfield, on the west side of Spencer Hollow Road just south of its junction with Vermont Route 143. It is a small single-storye brick building with a gabled slate roof and a stone foundation. A small gabled wood-frame ell extends to the south to which is attached a shed-roofed extension housing a woodshed and privy. The street-facing front facade has two sash windows, while the building entrance, once on the south facade (in an opening now bricked over), is now in the ell. The interior of the ell houses a small kitchen area, while the main chamber retains original features, including an old blackboard and benches built into the walls.

The school was built about 1810–20, on land belonging to Simeon Spencer, an early settler of the area. Its construction date is uncertain, as a school (possibly also built of brick) may have been standing on the site as early as the 1780s. The building is probably the oldest surviving brick schoolhouse in the state; the Eureka Schoolhouse, built in 1785, is the state's oldest documented schoolhouse, but it is wood-framed, and has been moved from its original site (it is now a state historic site). This school remained in operation until 1926, and in 1931 it was taken over by the Spencer Hollow Club, which used it as a social venue, hosting dances and other events. By the early 2000s it had been abandoned and extensively vandalized. It has since undergone restoration.

== See also ==
- National Register of Historic Places listings in Windsor County, Vermont
