= South Reading Schoolhouse =

- U.S. National Register of Historic Places
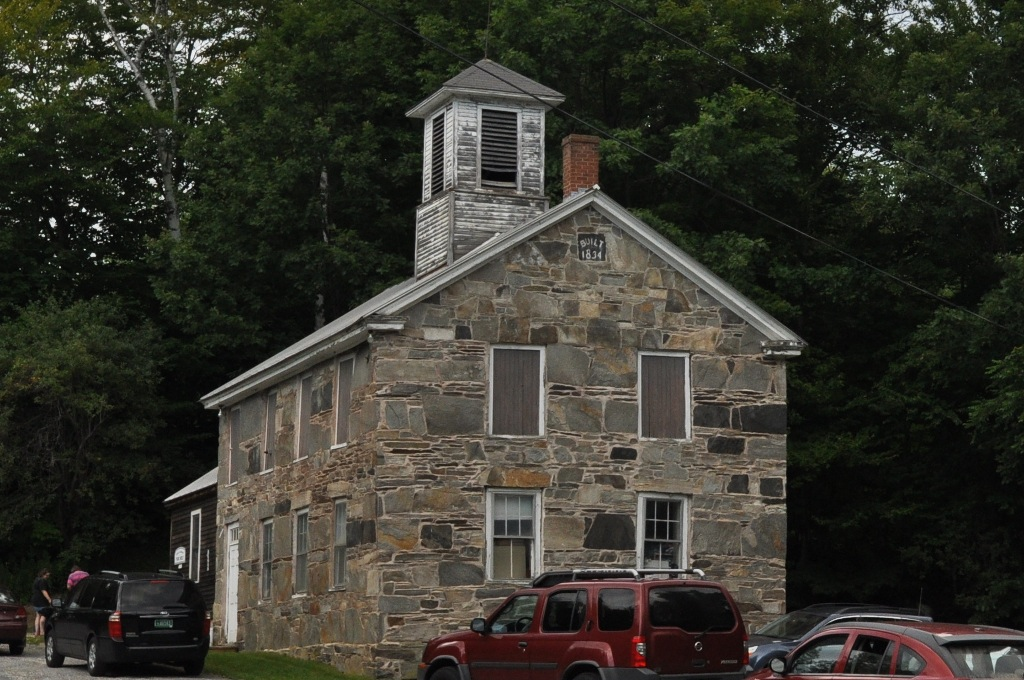

- Location within Vermont
- Location: Tyson Rd., South Reading, Vermont
- Coordinates: 43°28′34″N 72°35′41″W
- Area: 0.5 acres (0.20 ha)
- Built: 1834
- Built by: Wardner, Clark; Adams, John
- NRHP reference No.: 83003233
- Added to NRHP: February 3, 1983

The South Reading Schoolhouse is a historic school building at Tyson and Bartley Roads in Reading, Vermont. Built in 1834, it is a distinctive example of the regional "snecked masonry" style, and the oldest known structure of the style to survive. It was used as a school until 1970, and was listed on the National Register of Historic Places in 1983.

== Description and history ==
The South Reading Schoolhouse stands in central southern Reading, just west of the rural village of South Reading at the junction of Tyson and Bartley Roads. It is a two-story stone structure, with gabled roof topped by a square belfry with pyramidal roof. Although nominally Greek Revival in style, it is nearly devoid of ornamentation due to its stone construction. The building ends are two bays wide, and the sides four, with sash windows in rectangular openings, and the main entrance in the leftmost bay of the facade facing Tyson Road. A wood-frame shed is attached to the west side of the building. The interior consists of two large classroom spaces, one on each floor, with an enclosed stairway on one side. Original floorboards have been covered with modern maple flooring, and the walls are wainscoted and plastered.

The school was built in 1834, probably by Clark Wardner and John Adams, two known practitioners of the "snecked masonry" style. This method of construction, regionally localized to southern Windsor County, consists of constructing a rubble wall finished with vertically laid slabs of granite, which were readily split from local rock formations. Although the outer layer is in some sense a veneer, in this construction technique they actually form an integral part of the load-bearing aspect of the wall. The technique is believed to have been brought in by Scottish immigrant masons in the early 1830s. This schoolhouse, one of two built in Reading in 1834, are one of the earliest uses of the technique; the oldest documented use, a factory building in Cavendish built in 1832, is no longer standing.

== See also ==
- National Register of Historic Places listings in Windsor County, Vermont
