= Rev. George Daman House =

Historic house in Vermont, United States

- U.S. National Register of Historic Places
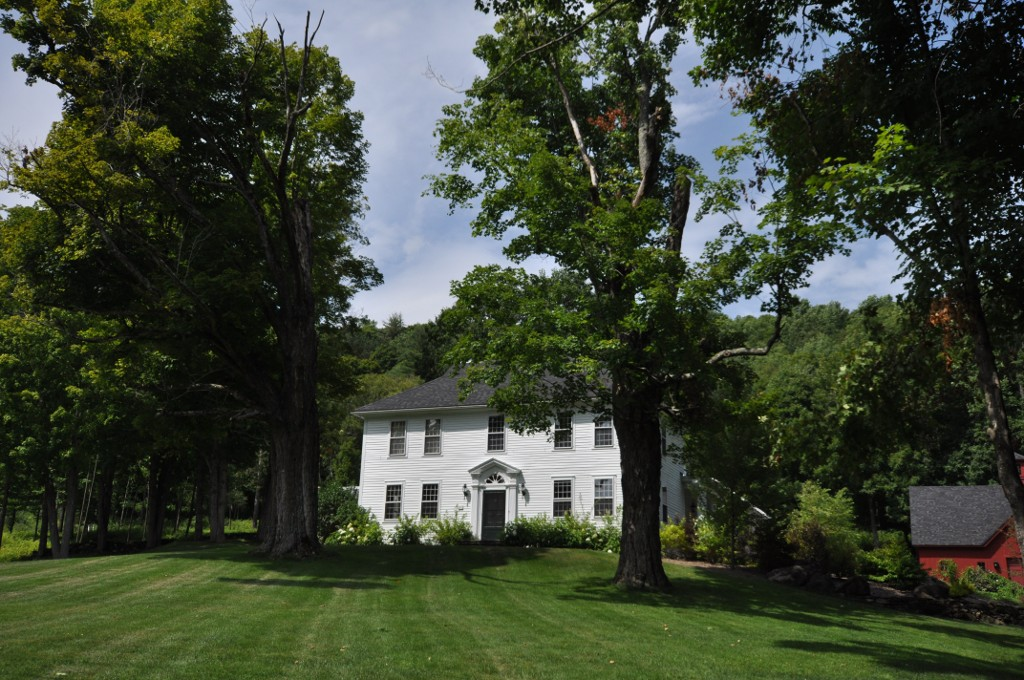

- Location within Vermont Location within the United States
- Location: Wyman Ln., Woodstock, Vermont
- Area: 149.2 acres (60.4 ha)
- Built: 1782
- Built by: Safford, Joseph
- Architectural style: Georgian, Federal
- NRHP reference No.: 89000759
- Added to NRHP: June 22, 1989

The Rev. George Daman House is a historic house on Wyman Lane in Woodstock, Vermont, USA. Built in 1782 on the town's original 150-acre (61 ha) ministerial lot (which has remained largely undivided), it is a fine example of transitional Georgian/Federal styling in southeastern Vermont. It was listed on the National Register of Historic Places in 1989.

== Description and history ==
The Daman House stands on a hill overlooking the Ottauquechee River in western Woodstock. Wyman Lane, which provides access to the house, is a portion of the former stage route, now bypassed by United States Route 4 to the south. The main house is a 2 1/2-story I-house, five bays wide, and one bay deep, with a large ell extending to its rear. It has a post-and-beam frame, is covered by a gabled roof, and its exterior is sheathed in wooden clapboards. It rests on a c. 1945 concrete foundation, faced in granite. It has sash windows framed by plain surrounds with drip molding. The main entrance is flanked by pilasters and topped by a half-round transom and pediment with gable. The interior retains many original period features, including a fireplace surround finished in Dutch tile, something that is quite rare in Vermont.

The town of Woodstock was incorporated in 1762, at which time it set aside (as required by its charter) a parcel of land for its "settled" Congregational minister. The town's first minister, Rev. Aaron Hutchinson, was itinerant, traveling among the local towns, and it was not until 1782 that Rev. George Daman of Martha's Vineyard was retained as its first settled minister. He was given the 150-acre (61 ha) parcel that had been set aside in 1762, where this house stands. The house was built by Joseph Safford, a builder who had also come from Massachusetts. The high quality distinctive transitional Georgian-Federal features of this house are probably due in part to the builder's familiarity with recent architectural fashions of the day. The property remained in the hands of Daman's descendants until 1894.

== See also ==
- National Register of Historic Places listings in Windsor County, Vermont
