= Wentworth and Diana Eldredge House =

- U.S. National Register of Historic Places
- Location: Address Restricted, Norwich, Vermont
- Area: 11.2 acres (4.5 ha)
- Architect: Margaret and Ted Hunter
- Architectural style: Mid-Century Modern
- NRHP reference No.: 100006133
- Added to NRHP: February 5, 2021

The Wentworth and Diana Eldredge House is a historic house in Norwich, Vermont. Built in 1948 to a design by local architects Margaret and Ted Hunter, it is one of the town's finer examplers of Mid-Century Modern architecture. It was listed in the National Register of Historic Places in 2020.

== Description and history ==
The Eldredge House is located in a rural setting in Norwich, set on the crest of a hill with expansive views of the Connecticut River valley. It is a two-story structure, roughly rectangular in shape, with a flat roof and exterior finished in stucco in parts and board and batten siding in others. Large windows, some fixed and some casement, predominate on the southern facade. The roof has extended eaves projecting from most elevations, and there is a sympathetically designed 1989 garage extending at an angle to the southwest of the main block. The interior retains many original period finishes and features, including a spiral staircase. Also on the property is a small artist's studio, built at the same time as the house.

The house was built in 1948 for H. Wentworth Eldredge, a sociology professor at nearby Dartmouth College, and his wife Diana. They chose to name their home Tarn House, possibly an allusion to Diana's Scottish heritage (she was the daughter of Sir William Younger, 1st Baronet, of Auchen Castle). The house was designed by Ted and Margaret Hunter, architects with a practice in Hanover, New Hampshire. Both of the Hunters had studied architecture at Harvard University under Walter Gropius, and had adopted his Internationalist style for much of their work. This house, with its rectilinear design, flat roof, and harmonious setting in the landscape, is a good example of principles Gropius espoused.

== See also ==
- National Register of Historic Places listings in Windsor County, Vermont
