= Owen Moon Farm =

Historic house in Vermont, United States

- U.S. National Register of Historic Places
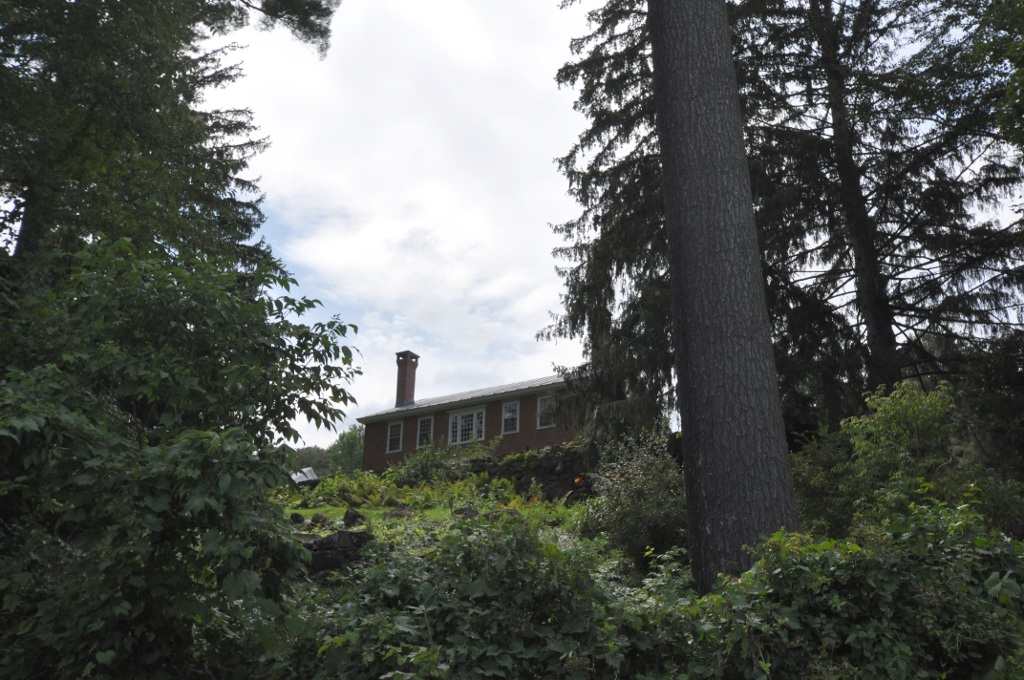

- Location within Vermont Location within the United States
- Location: Morgan Hill Rd., South Woodstock, Vermont
- Coordinates: 43°33′18″N 72°31′59″W
- Area: 8 acres (3.2 ha)
- Built: 1816
- Architectural style: Colonial Revival, Federal
- NRHP reference No.: 83003231
- Added to NRHP: January 27, 1983

The Owen Moon Farm is a historic country estate on Morgan Hill Road in South Woodstock, Vermont. Set on a steeply sloped 8-acre (3.2 ha) parcel are its main house, an 1816 brick building, a barn, and a 1930s bungaloid guest house. The hilly terrain is heavily landscaped, forming an important visual component of the estate, and serving to afford it privacy from the nearby public roads. It was listed on the National Register of Historic Places in 1983, primarily for the well-preserved Federal period architecture of the main house.

== Description and history ==
The Owen Moon Farm stands on the west side of Morgan Hill Road, about 0.5 miles (0.80 km) south of Vermont Route 106 in southern Woodstock. It is set on a wooded rise, with a loop drive that accesses the building complex from the east and south. The main house stands at the top of the rise, screened from the road by a stand of tall trees. It is a 2 1/2-story brick building, with a post-and-beam wooden frame, gabled roof, and brick veneer exterior. The main facade faces east, and has a center entrance with flanking sidelight windows that have oval tracery, and narrow pilasters, with a rectangular transom and entablature above. A square-headed Palladian window is set directly above the entrance. A Colonial Revival porch projects from the north gable end, and a 1 1/2-story ell extending to the building's rear. A 1 1/2-story Bungalow-style guest house stands just west of the house, and a c. 1890 barn, rehabilitated in the late 1930s, stands to the south.

The house was built in 1816 by John Lake, a highly regarded local carpenter. For much of the 19th century it belonged to the Kendall family, and was purchased in 1937 by Owen Moon, a retired businessman. Moon oversaw the transformation of the property into a country estate, enlarging the house, building the guest house, and rehabilitating the barn. Moon also had the hilly parcel terraced and landscaped with formal and informal gardens.

== See also ==
- National Register of Historic Places listings in Windsor County, Vermont
