= Slayton–Morgan Historic District =

Historic district in Vermont, United States

- U.S. National Register of Historic Places
- U.S. Historic district
- Location: Address restricted Woodstock, Vermont
- Area: 2.2 acres (0.89 ha)
- Built: 1792
- Architectural style: Stone chamber
- NRHP reference No.: 91001944
- Added to NRHP: June 24, 2010

The Slayton–Morgan Historic District, designated VT-WN-16 in the state archaeological inventory, encompasses a collection of archaeologically sensitive historic sites in Woodstock, Vermont. The 2.2-acre (0.89 ha) parcel includes an early root cellar, foundational remnants of a late 18th-century farmstead, and a marked stone that has been speculatively interpreted to have pre-Columbian Celtic markings. The district was listed on the National Register of Historic Places in 2010.

== Description and history ==
The Slayton–Morgan Historic District is located in a rural area of the town of Woodstock. The 2.2-acre (0.89 ha) parcel is roughly divided between a wooded area and an open area that was once meadow and has a low knoll. The parcel is lined by stone walls that probably date to the late 18th or early 19th century. There are two cellar holes, representing the foundations of houses, one of which has been dated 1792, when James Slayton established a farm here. A structure interpreted as a root cellar is located in the southern half of the parcel; it is a stone structure, with three of its side walls and top covered by an earthen embankment. Its east side has an uncovered opening, providing access to the interior. Elements of the interior have stone carvings of uncertain origin and differing interpretation. The structure is one of the best-preserved of its type in the state. Near the northwest corner of the parcel, where two stone walls meet, is a pyramidal stone aligned on a north-south axis with another nearby stone, on which carvings resembling the Eye of Balor are found.

The area's undisputed history begins in the late 18th century, when James Slayton established a farm on this and the surrounding land. It was operated as a farm until about 1915, by which time all of the buildings had been demolished. In the 1970s, the stone chamber became the focus of a debate, with one side claiming it as evidence of pre-Columbian contact by Celtic peoples, and others claiming it was merely a distinctive example of an early settlement period vernacular cellar used either for storing root vegetables or sheltering sheep. A third interpretation suggests such chambers may have been used by Native Americans as sweat lodges. The interior chamber of this construction is the largest known in the state, measuring about 10 by 20 feet (3.0 m × 6.1 m).

== See also ==
- National Register of Historic Places listings in Windsor County, Vermont
