= Glimmerstone =

Historic house in Vermont, United States

- U.S. National Register of Historic Places
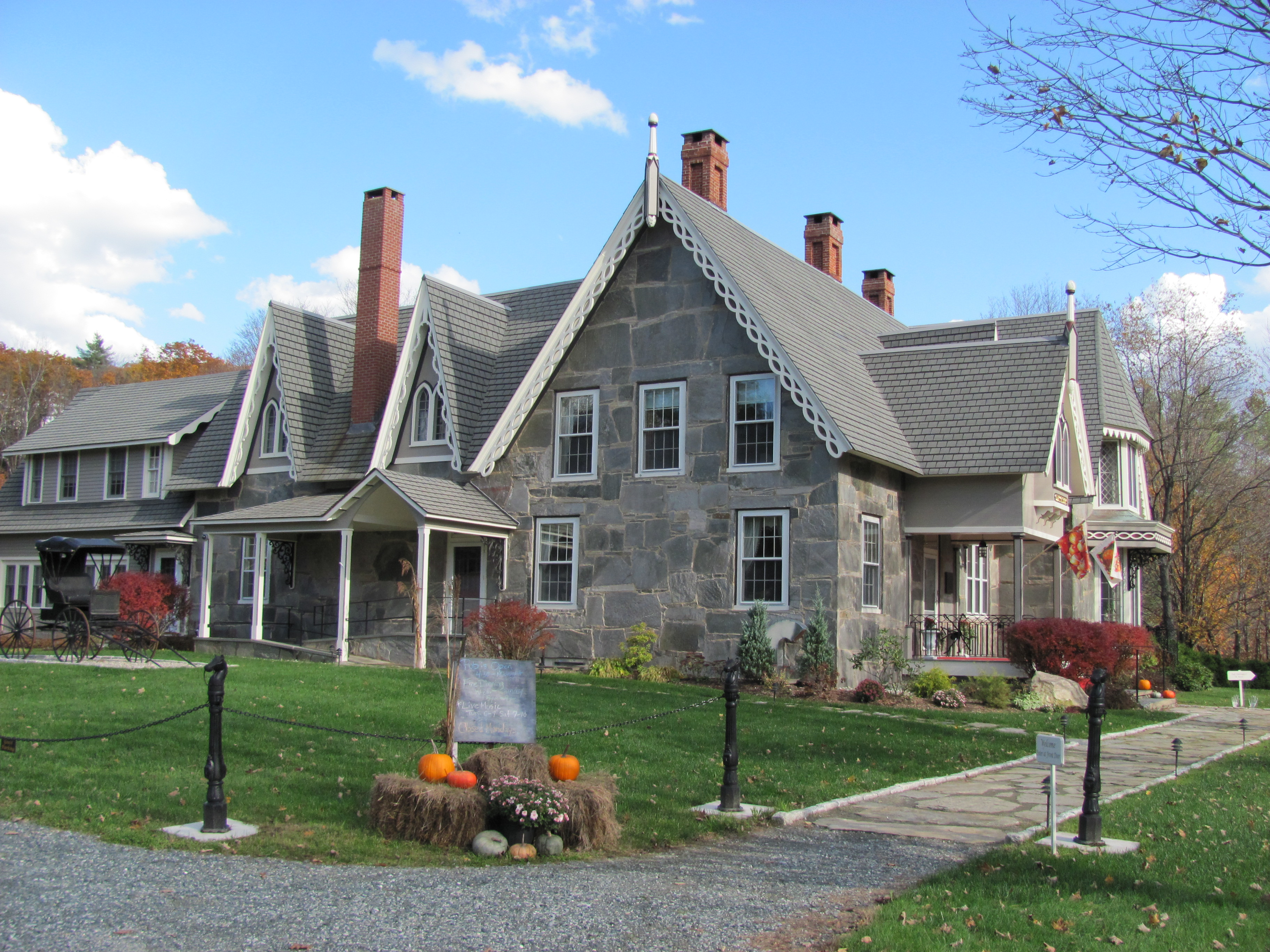

- Location within Vermont
- Location: VT 131, Cavendish, Vermont
- Coordinates: 43°22′58″N 72°36′48″W
- Area: 2.5 acres (1.0 ha)
- Built: 1844
- Architect: Page, Lucius
- Architectural style: Gothic Revival
- NRHP reference No.: 78000253
- Added to NRHP: November 14, 1978

Glimmerstone is a historic mansion house on Vermont Route 131, west of the village center of Cavendish, Vermont. Built 1844–47, it is a distinctive example of Gothic Revival architecture, built using a regional construction style called "snecked ashlar" out of locally quarried stone flecked with mica. The house was listed on the National Register of Historic Places in 1978.

== Description and history ==
Glimmerstone stands on the north side of Vermont 131, about 0.5 miles (0.80 km) west of Cavendish's village center. It is a two-story stone structure, with a roughly L-shaped plan and a cross-gable roof configuration. The street-facing front is divided into four sections, the rightmost one projecting with a hooded gable and bay windows on the both levels. The second bay has a three-sash window group, with a steeply pitched gable dormer above, and the main entrance is in the third bay, sheltered by a gabled porch. All of the building's gables are decorated with jigsawn vergeboard, and upper-level windows set in gable dormers have Gothic-arched tops. Similar dormers and gables are found on the sides of the house, and a wood-frame ell extends the house further to the rear.

The house was built in 1844-47 for Henry Fullerton, manager of the Black River Manufacturing and Canal Company mill in Cavendish. The stone from which it was built was quarried about 0.25 miles (0.40 km) away, and hauled to the site by sledge in winter for construction in warmer weather. The construction style consists of stone facing on either side of rubble fill, with slabs sometimes laid across the fill to provide strength. This construction method, known in southern Vermont as "snecked ashlar", is believed to have been brought to the area by Scottish immigrant masons. The house's design is by a local carpenter, Lucius Paige, and is based on designs published by Andrew Jackson Downing.

== See also ==
- National Register of Historic Places listings in Windsor County, Vermont
