= Fire District No. 2 Firehouse =

- U.S. National Register of Historic Places
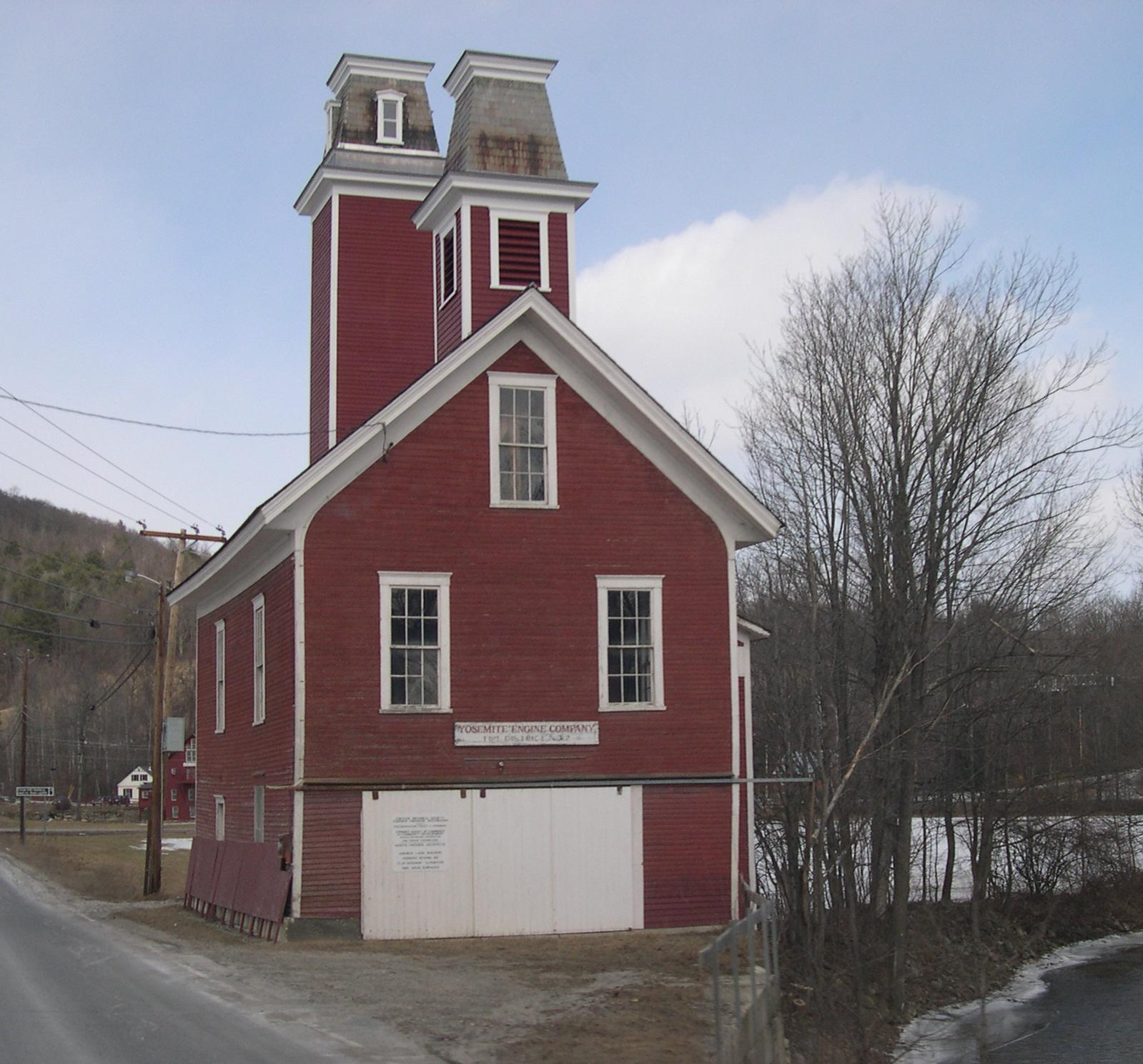

- Location within Vermont Location within the United States
- Location: 716 Depot St., Chester, Vermont
- Coordinates: 43°16′12″N 72°35′22″W
- Area: less than one acre
- Built: 1879
- Architectural style: Second Empire
- NRHP reference No.: 100005063
- Added to NRHP: March 16, 2020

The Fire District No. 2 Firehouse, also known locally as the Yosemite Engine House, is a historic fire station at 716 Depot Street in Chester, Vermont, United States. Built in 1879, it is architecturally distinctive in the state as the only period fire station with two towers, which also distinctively exhibit Second Empire styling. Now owned by the town, it was listed on the National Register of Historic Places in 2020.

== Description and history ==
The Yosemite Engine House occupies a visually prominent location at the northern fringe of the village of Chester Depot village, on the east side of Depot Street (Vermont Route 103). It is set close to the road, sandwiched between the road and the Williams River. It is a 2-1/2 story frame structure with a gabled roof and clapboarded exterior. The main vehicle entrance is on the south facade, with a rail-mounted sliding door added in the 20th century. The building's defining features are its two towers. The north tower is the taller of the two and was used to dry hoses, while the shorter south tower houses the belfry. Both towers are topped by distinctive mansard roofs, each with a molded crown. The second story of the building houses a small meeting hall.

Chester's fire district #2 was established in 1871, in the wake of several major fires in the village of Chester Depot. Although its designer is not known, its Second Empire features were probably due to the influence of Frederick Marsh, a local businessman who had built a house in that style nearby, and who served as an engineer in the Yosemite Engine Company, the principal firefighting unit of the district. The building's vehicle entrance, originally designed for human- or horse-drawn equipment, was enlarged in the 1930s to accommodate engine-powered equipment. The fire district, a separate taxing entity from the town since its creation, was dissolved in 1967, and its properties reverted to the town. It was eventually sold into private hands, and was operated for a short time as a museum by the local historical society before being reacquired by the town in 2018.

== See also ==
- National Register of Historic Places listings in Windsor County, Vermont
