= Saddlebow Farm =

- U.S. National Register of Historic Places
- U.S. Historic district
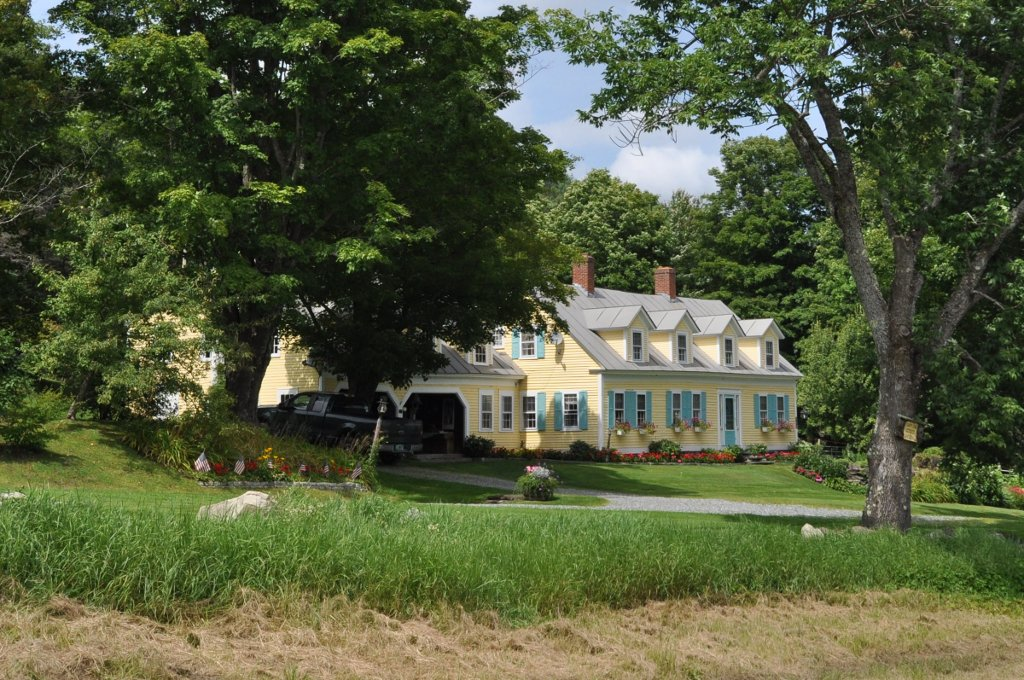

- Location within Vermont Location within the United States
- Location: 2477 Gold Coast Rd., Bridgewater, Vermont
- Coordinates: 43°36′47″N 72°37′7.4″W
- Area: 140.1 acres (56.7 ha)
- Built: 1786
- Architectural style: Early Republic
- NRHP reference No.: 02001345
- Added to NRHP: November 14, 2002

Saddlebow Farm is a historic farm property at 2477 Gold Coast Road in Bridgewater, Vermont. With a history dating to the 1780s, the property is a fine example of the conversion of agricultural properties to summer and tourist-oriented uses in the 20th century. The 140-acre (57 ha) property was listed on the National Register of Historic Places in 2002.

== Description and history ==
Saddlebow Farm is located in a rural upland area north of the village of Bridgewater. The property consists of about 140 acres (57 ha) in an L-shaped parcel., of which about 8 acres (3.2 ha) are in meadow and the balance is wooded. The high point of the property is on a ridge north of the house, which has been cleared to provide 360-degree views. The farm complex is located on the northwest side of Gold Coast Road, amid the meadows. Its central focus is the 1786 Cape style house, which has been enlarged for first tourist and later summer residential use, but retains original features and fixtures in its core. A particularly distinctive feature, found only locally in the Bridgewater area, is an "outdoor living room": this is a former woodshed attached to the south side of the house, with carriage door bays in the front that are open during warmer seasons and only enclosed in the winter.

The farm's documentary history begins in 1786, when the land was acquired by Joseph French, a veteran of the American Revolutionary War. After 59 years of ownership by members of the French family, it underwent a number of ownership changes into the 20th century, the property varying in size from 140 to 190 acres. The farm was not really suitable for either subsistence or dairy farming, and it was sold in 1931 to Frances Weed of Summerville, South Carolina. Mrs. Weed converted the property to an inn, expanding the farmhouse to accommodate guests. The inn was not a financial success, probably due to the Great Depression, and the property was sold in 1937 into private hands. First used as a summer residence, it has been converted back into a year-round residence, with a series of farm buildings added during the 20th century.

== See also ==
- National Register of Historic Places listings in Windsor County, Vermont
