= Park Street School =

- U.S. National Register of Historic Places
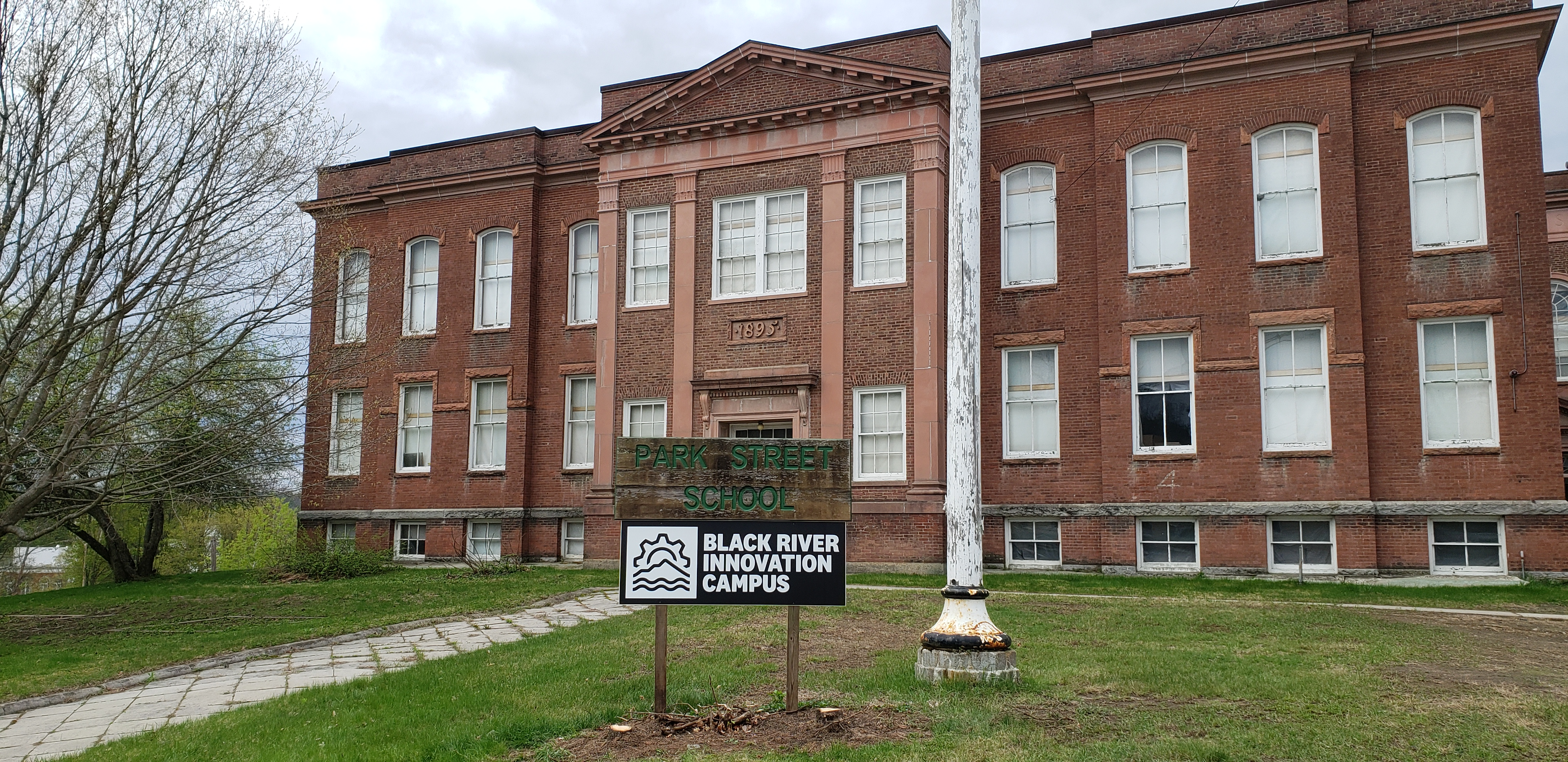

- Location within Vermont Location within the United States
- Location: 60 Park St. Springfield, Vermont
- Coordinates: 43°17′57″N 72°29′7″W
- Area: less than one acre
- Built: 1937
- Architectural style: Colonial Revival
- NRHP reference No.: 100005653
- Added to NRHP: October 7, 2020

The Park Street School is a historic school building at 60 Park Street in Springfield, Vermont.Built in 1895 and enlarged in 1929, it was the town's first high school to be built after the consolidation of district schools began. It served as a high school until 1968. The building was listed on the National Register of Historic Places in 2020. The building now houses a worker training organization and residences.

== Description and history ==
Springfield's Park Street School is located across the Black River from the town center, on the south side of a climbing bend in Park Street. The building consists of two large blocks joined by a recessed connecting wing. The older portion of the building, built in 1895-6 is to the right, while the left side and connector were added in 1929. Both main blocks feature Classical Revival styling. The older one has a three-section facade, with a projecting central entrance bay flanked by large round-topped windows. The entrance bay is itself three bays wide, articulated by pilasters and topped by a triangular pediment. The 1929 block echos some of these features, with a similar central bay flanked by bays of large sash windows on each of its floors.

The school was built in 1895-6, to a design by local architect Hiram Beckwith. It was not the first high school in the town, which was a private seminary established in 1846. After its move to Montpelier in 1866, the town established a publicly funded high school the following year. This school was built in part as a response to state legislating mandating municipal controls over all public education, essentially ending the era of district schools. The school initially had ten classrooms, which proved to be inadequate as little as ten years later to meet growing demand. A second building (no longer extant) was built on the same property in 1911 to meet this demand, with a further addition to the rear of this school in 1920. Continued growth eventually spurred the construction of the second large wing, which was designed by Haynes & Mason of Keene, New Hampshire and built in 1929-31.

Continued population growth in the town eventually required the construction of the new Springfield High School, which opened in 1968. This school was then repurposed to house lower grades and school administration.

== See also ==
- National Register of Historic Places listings in Windsor County, Vermont
