= Fletcher–Fullerton Farm =

- U.S. National Register of Historic Places
- U.S. Historic district
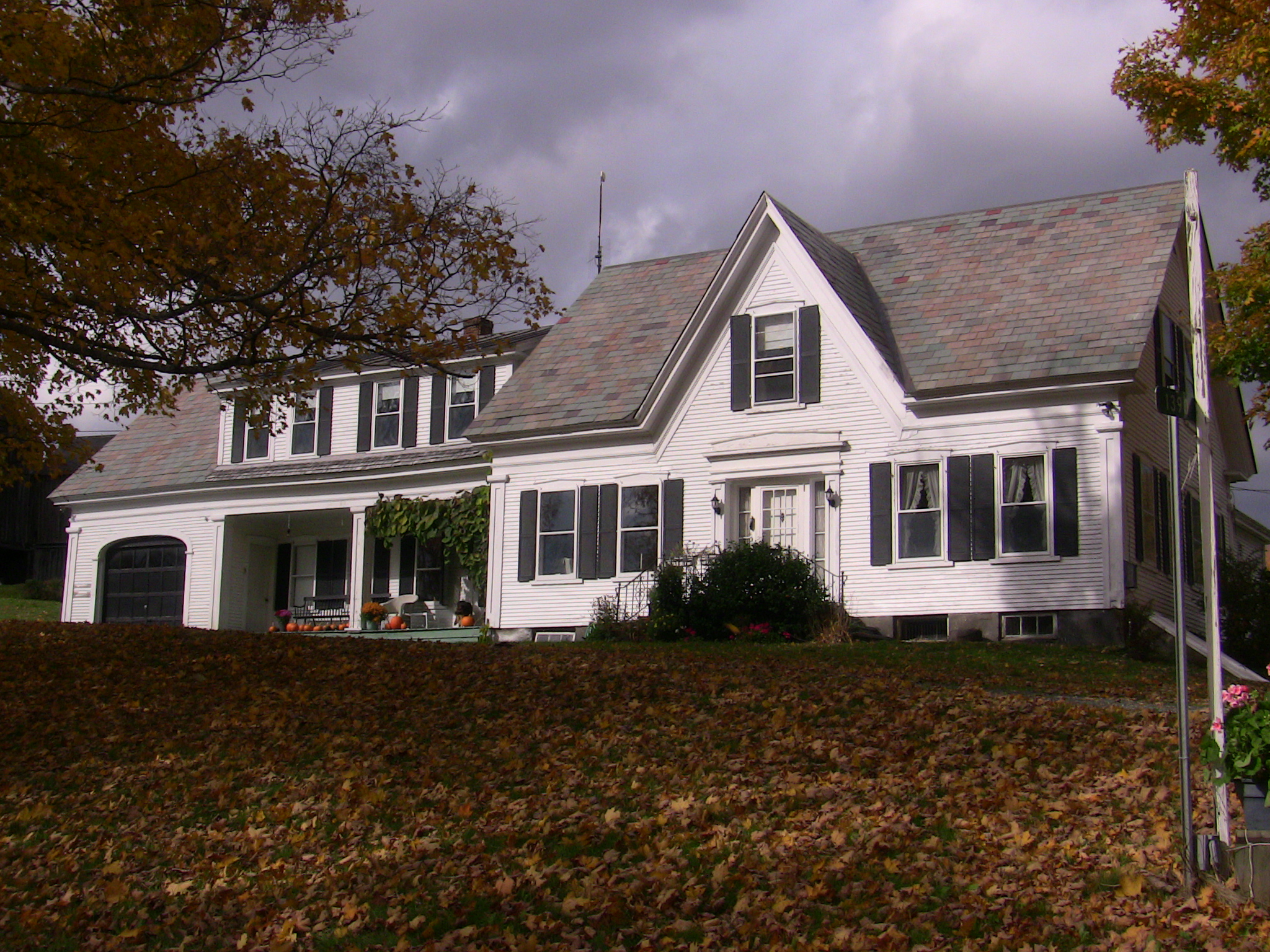

- Location within Vermont Location within the United States
- Location: 1390 Fletcher Schoolhouse Rd., Woodstock, Vermont
- Coordinates: 43°34′8″N 72°33′35″W
- Area: 55.8 acres (22.6 ha)
- Built: 1814
- Architectural style: Greek Revival
- MPS: Agricultural Resources of Vermont MPS
- NRHP reference No.: 04001215
- Added to NRHP: November 4, 2004

Top Acres Farm, known historically as the Fletcher–Fullerton Farm, is a farm property at 1390 Fletcher Schoolhouse Road in Woodstock, Vermont. Developed as a farm in the early 19th century, it was in continuous agricultural use by just two families for nearly two centuries. It was listed on the National Register of Historic Places in 2004.

== Description and history ==
Top Acres Farm consists of nearly 56 acres (23 ha) of rolling pasture and woods in a rural area of southern Woodstock. Most of its land is located north of Fletcher Schoolhouse Road (formerly Fletcher Hill Road Extension), with the farmstead complex straddling the road near the southern part of the property. The main house is a rambling 1-1/2 story Greek Revival structure, built about 1850, and set on the north side of the road. Just across the road is a small sugar house. North of (behind) the house are a corn house, barn, and dairy barn, all of which date to no later than 1830, and a 20th-century chicken house. Rolling meadows and wood lots extend north from this complex.

The farm was established in the first decade of the 19th century by Russell Fletcher, the son of one of South Woodstock's early settlers, who acquired several parcels of land. Although the current farmhouse dates to the mid-19th century, it is possible that one of its ells constitutes the original farmhouse. It was owned by Fletcher family members, growing in size to 400 acres (160 ha), until 1902, when it was sold to Erwin Fullerton. The farm property was used by its various owners for a variety of purposes including the raising of grain and other crops, the raising of sheep, and as a dairy operation. When the property was listed on the National Register in 2004, it was still owned by a Fullerton, but agricultural activity had ceased and the farmhouse was used as a tourist accommodation.

== See also ==
- National Register of Historic Places listings in Windsor County, Vermont
