= Norwich Village Historic District =

Historic district in Vermont, United States

- U.S. National Register of Historic Places
- U.S. Historic district
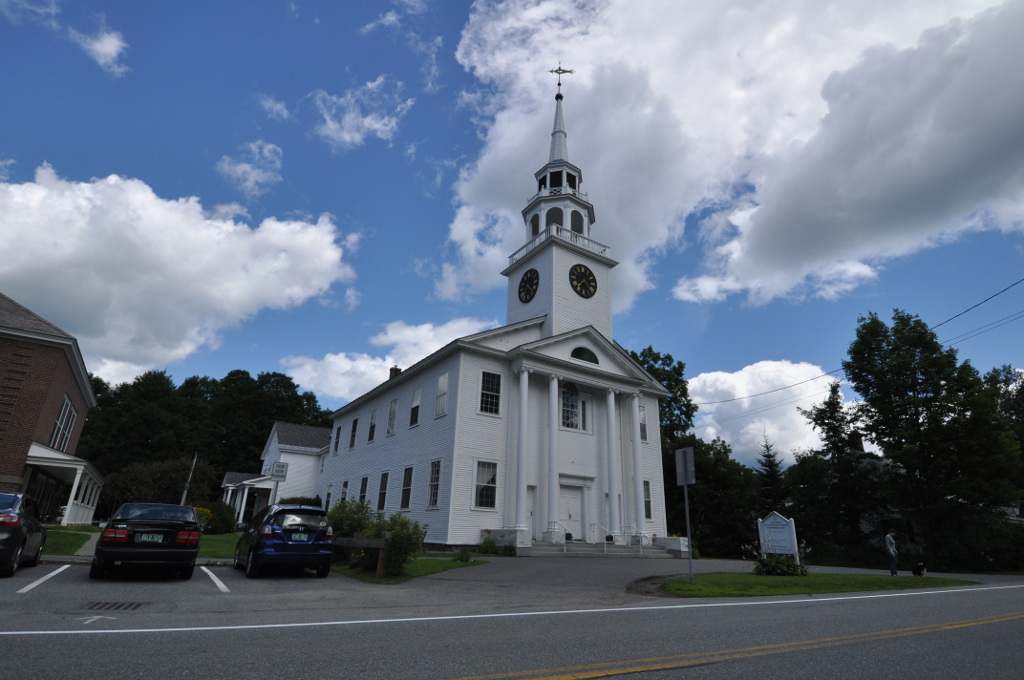
- Congregational Church

- Location within Vermont Location within the United States
- Location: Main St. from S of Elm St. to Turnpike Rd. and adjacent portions of Elm, Church, Mechanic, Hazen and Cliff Sts., Norwich, Vermont
- Coordinates: 43°42′56″N 72°18′38″W
- Area: 125 acres (51 ha)
- Architect: Emerson, Joseph; Hatch, Joseph
- Architectural style: Colonial Revival, Greek Revival, Federal
- NRHP reference No.: 90002116
- Added to NRHP: January 3, 1991

The Norwich Village Historic District encompasses the compact village center of Norwich, Vermont. The village was developed mainly in the first half of the 19th century, benefiting in importance from the 1820 founding of what is now Norwich University (since relocated to Northfield). The district has well-preserved examples of architecture ranging from the late 18th century to the early 20th century. It was listed on the National Register of Historic Places in 1991.

== Description and history ==
The town of Norwich was chartered in 1761 and settled the following decade. Its original town center was located north of the present village, which rose in significance due to its location nearer fertile lands adjacent to the Connecticut River, and the 1820 establishment of the American Literary, Scientific and Military Academy, now Norwich University. The village population peaked about 1830, declining due to westward migration, and the eventual relocation of the military academy to Northfield; its original campus was destroyed by fire in the 1860s. A few homes survive from the early settlement period of the 18th century, with most of its architecture reflecting the Federal and Greek Revival periods of the first half of the 19th century. A number of Colonial Revival buildings were added in the early 20th century, and there are a modest number of Late Victorian buildings, notably the Norwich Inn.

The spine of the historic district is a section of United States Route 5 and Main Street north of Interstate 91, and extends along some of the cross streets. Buildings are mostly set on small lots, with modest setbacks from the street. The main focal point of the district is the village green, located at the junction of US 5 and Main Street, in front of the Marion Cross School. Arrayed around the green are municipal buildings, including the town hall and post office, as well as several churches and the town's elementary school. The town's general store, Dan and Whits, is on the west side of Main Street, north of this junction and adjacent to the Norwich Inn.

== See also ==
- National Register of Historic Places listings in Windsor County, Vermont
