= Zachariah Spaulding Farm =

- U.S. National Register of Historic Places
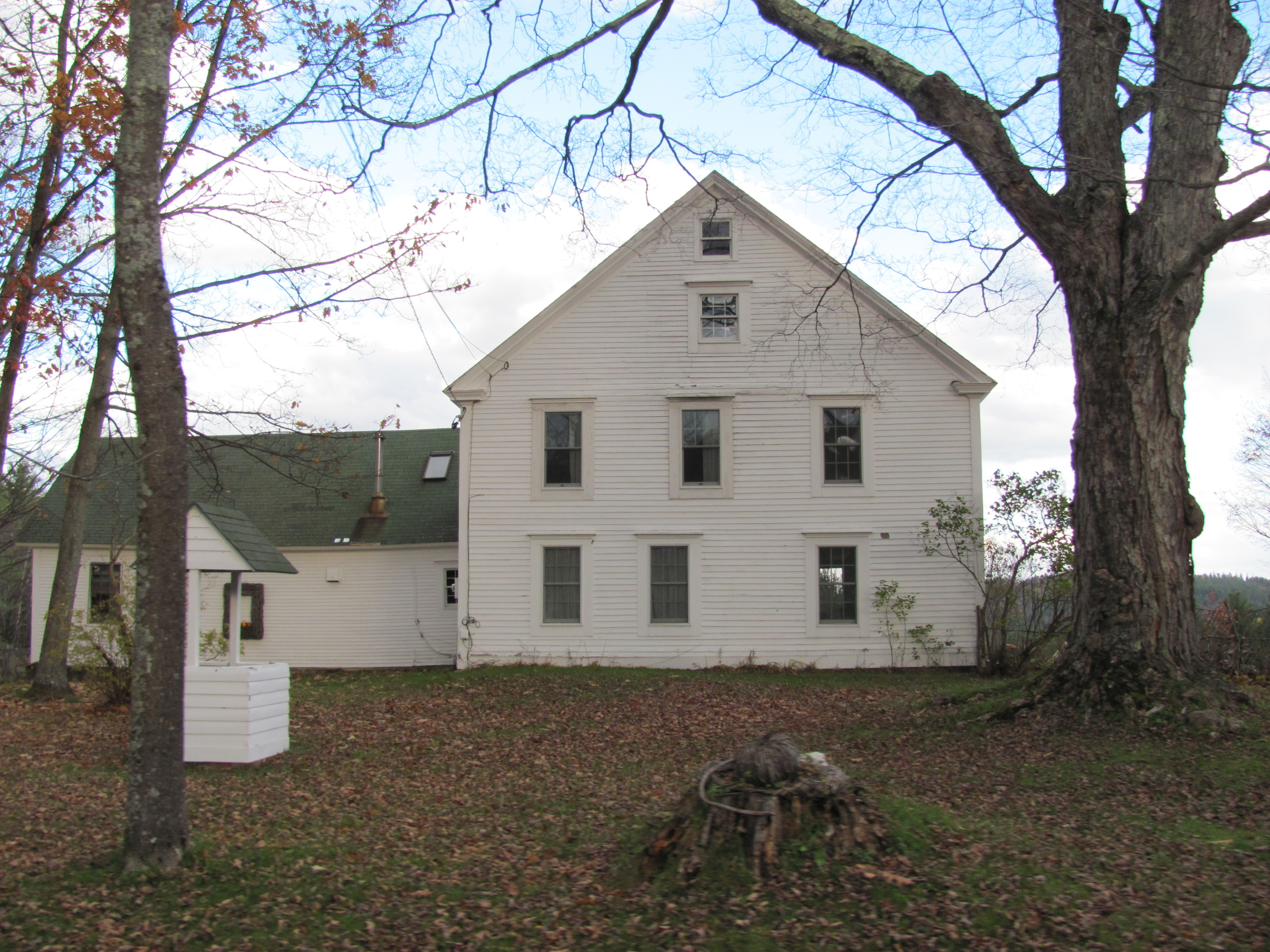

- Location within Vermont Location within the United States
- Location: Town Hwy. 38 (South Hill Rd.) S of Ludlow town center, Ludlow, Vermont
- Coordinates: 43°22′53″N 72°41′29″W
- Area: 10 acres (4.0 ha)
- Built: 1798
- MPS: Agricultural Resources of Vermont MPS
- NRHP reference No.: 93001175
- Added to NRHP: November 4, 1993

The Zachariah Spaulding Farm is a historic farmstead on South Hill Road in Ludlow, Vermont. With a history dating back to 1798, it is a well-preserved example of diversified 19th-century farmstead, made further distinctive by the remains of a sauna, the product of ownership by two Finnish families in the 20th century. It was listed on the National Register of Historic Places in 1993.

== Description and history ==
The Spaulding Farm property consists of 10 acres (4.0 ha) of land on the east side of South Hill Road, roughly midway between Godfrey Road and South Hill Cross Road. The roughly rectangular parcel is lined on its north by a stone wall, and most of its southern edge by fencing, and consists mostly of lands used for pasture and haymaking, with some woodlands towards the back of the property. The farmstead is clustered near the western end of the property, with the house set about 50 feet (15 m) back from the road. It is a handsome 2 1/2-story wood-frame structure, oriented with its main facade to the south and an ell extending to the north. Outbuildings on the property include two barns, both from the 19th century, a milkhouse, and a storage shed. Foundational remnants exist for a third barn, and for a modest structure that was probably built in the 1930s as a sauna.

The farmstead was developed in the 1790s by Zachariah Spaulding, who built the farmhouse in 1798. He was prominent in local civic affairs, serving in town offices and in the state legislature. In addition to agricultural uses, he briefly operated a brickmaking operation on the property in the 1810s, but apparently ended the effort due to inferior clay, taken from the streambed on the property. His son continued to work the land until 1885, when it was sold out of the family. The farm was in active use, generally as a diversified operation with multiple products, through about 1974.

== See also ==
- National Register of Historic Places listings in Windsor County, Vermont
