= Stockbridge Common Historic District =

Historic district in Vermont, United States

- U.S. National Register of Historic Places
- U.S. Historic district
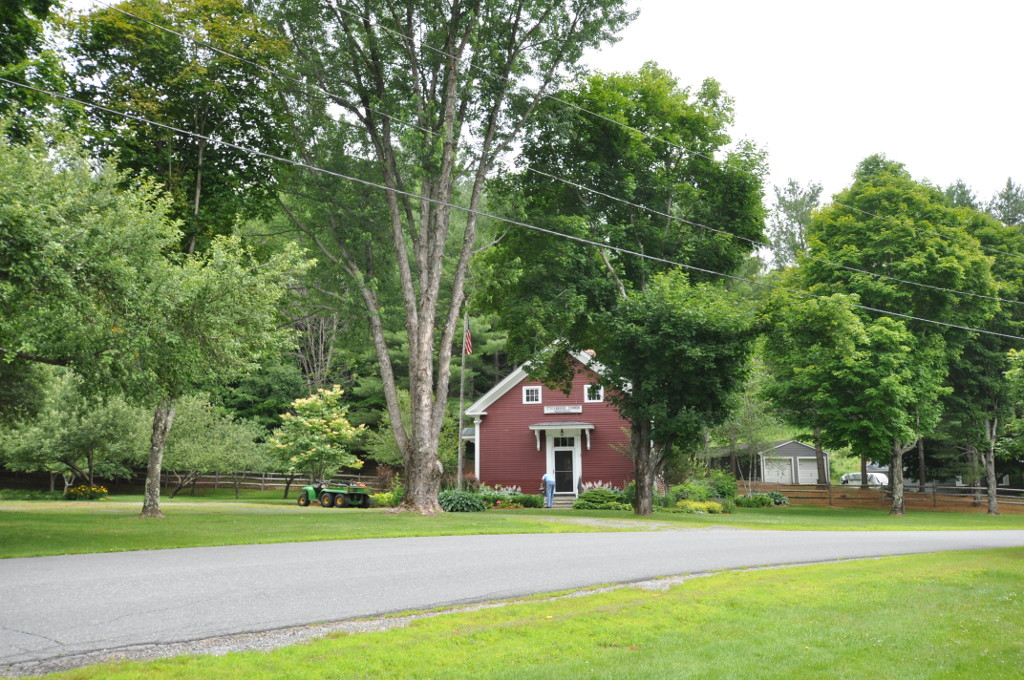
- Part of the common, and the historic schoolhouse

- Location within Vermont Location within the United States
- Location: Area around Stockbridge Common, including Maplewood Cemetery, Stockbridge, Vermont
- Coordinates: 43°47′12″N 72°45′19″W
- Area: 15 acres (6.1 ha)
- Built: 1804
- Architectural style: Greek Revival, Federal
- NRHP reference No.: 90000800
- Added to NRHP: May 24, 1990

The Stockbridge Common Historic District encompasses the central portion of a rural 19th-century village center in Stockbridge, Vermont. Including the town common as well as a few buildings and an adjacent cemetery, it is a well-preserved example of a village bypassed by economic development during the 19th century industrial period. It was listed on the National Register of Historic Places in 1990.

== Description and history ==
The small town of Stockbridge was chartered in 1761, but was not settled until the 1780s. At that time Elias Keyes was granted land in the town, on the condition that he build a saw mill and grist mill. He chose a site on the White Riverfor the mills, a few miles above its confluence with the Tweed River. On a terrace north of the mill site he began to build a house, and gave land for use as the town common and cemetery; this area became what is now the village of Stockbridge Common. Although the village has some of the trappings of a town center, including a church and district schoolhouse, it was not economically successful, owing to its distance from the river and its placement on a rise above more convenient travel routes along the river. The village was eclipsed in the 19th century by the village of Gaysville, located on the White River, whose industries were decimated by Vermont's devastating 1927 floods.

The historic district is centered on the town common, which is surrounded by Stockbridge Common Road and Maplewood Road, the latter separating it from the Maplewood Cemetery to the south. Lining the north side of Stockbridge Common Road and the westernmost part of Maplewood are six 19th-century buildings that make up the district along with the common and cemetery. Included are the house begun by Keyes and completed by Seth Wright c. 1804, a massive example of Federal period architecture, and the 1826 Union Church, a vernacular Greek Revival building built on land donated by Keyes. The former district schoolhouse, built in 1884, is one of the newest buildings in the district.

== See also ==
- National Register of Historic Places listings in Windsor County, Vermont
