= Gilbert's Hill =

- U.S. National Register of Historic Places
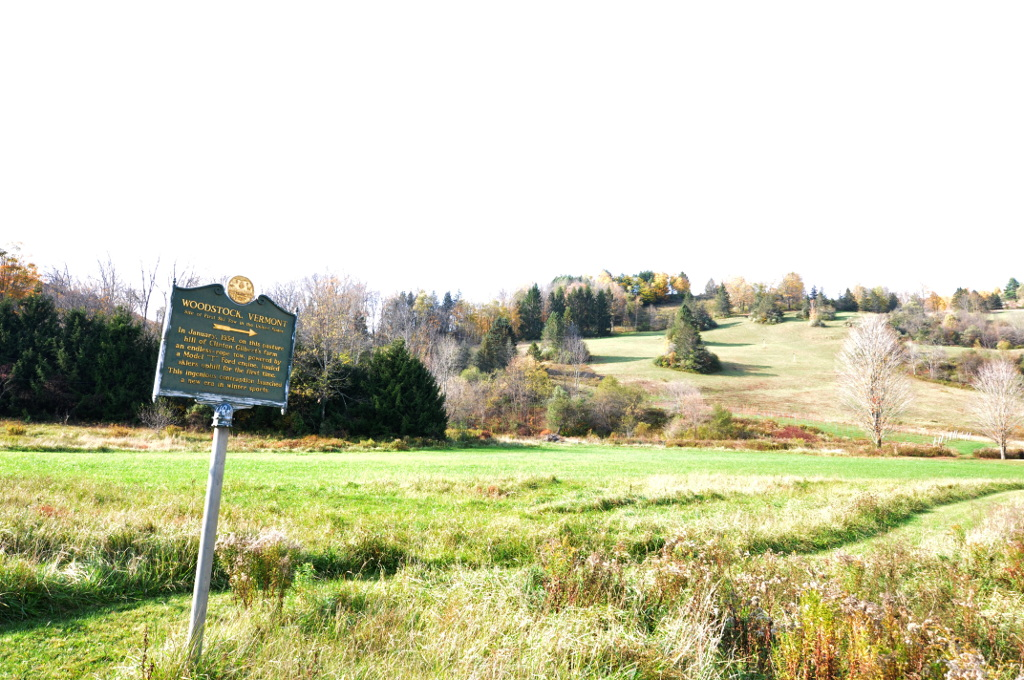

- Location within Vermont Location within the United States
- Location: 1362 Barnard Rd., Woodstock, Vermont
- Coordinates: 43°38′50″N 72°32′21″W
- Area: 112 acres (45 ha)
- Built: c. 1854; 1934
- Architectural style: Greek Revival; ski area
- NRHP reference No.: 100003524
- Added to NRHP: March 18, 2019

Gilbert's Hill, also known more recently as the Appel Farm, is a historic farm property and former ski area at 1362 Barnard Road (Vermont Route 12) in Woodstock, Vermont. Developed as a farm in the mid 19th century, it was developed as a downhill ski area in the early 20th century, and is the location of the first rope tow in the northeastern United States. It was listed on the National Register of Historic Places in 2019. The property is privately owned, but is open to the public via conservation and historic preservation easements.

== Description and history ==
Gilbert's Hill is located in a rural setting about two miles northwest of the village center of Woodstock, on the north side of Barnard Road a short way east of its junction with Gully Road. The property is 112 acres (45 ha) in size, much of which is open meadow, with the balance wooded. A cluster of farm buildings is set at a distance from the roadway (which in an earlier alignment passed directly through it). The oldest building is the farmhouse, a wood-frame structure with Greek Revival and Gothic Revival features which was built about 1854. There are two barns and a milk house, all dating to the 19th century, and there is a ski hut at the base of the hillside behind the farm yard. The hut was built about 1936, and is a modest frame structure finished with novelty siding and a metal roof.

The property was first developed as a diversified farm in the 1840s by members of the McKenzie family, and its collection of 19th-century farm buildings is one of the best preserved of its age in the region. After undergoing several ownership changes, it was purchased by Clinton and Persis Gilbert in 1929, who operated it largely as a dairy farm. By this time, Woodstock had already begun to develop a reputation as a destination for winter outdoor activities. The owners of the Woodstock Inn were instrumental in the development of a rope tow, powered by the motor of a Ford Model T truck, and paid the Gilberts for permission to install it on their hillside in 1934. The innovation made it possible for skiers to quickly ascend the hill, and to enjoy many more downhill runs than were previously possible. The hill was used as a ski area until 1965, and there is now a historical marker near the site.

== See also ==
- National Register of Historic Places listings in Windsor County, Vermont
