= Southview Housing Historic District =

Historic district in Vermont, United States

- U.S. National Register of Historic Places
- U.S. Historic district
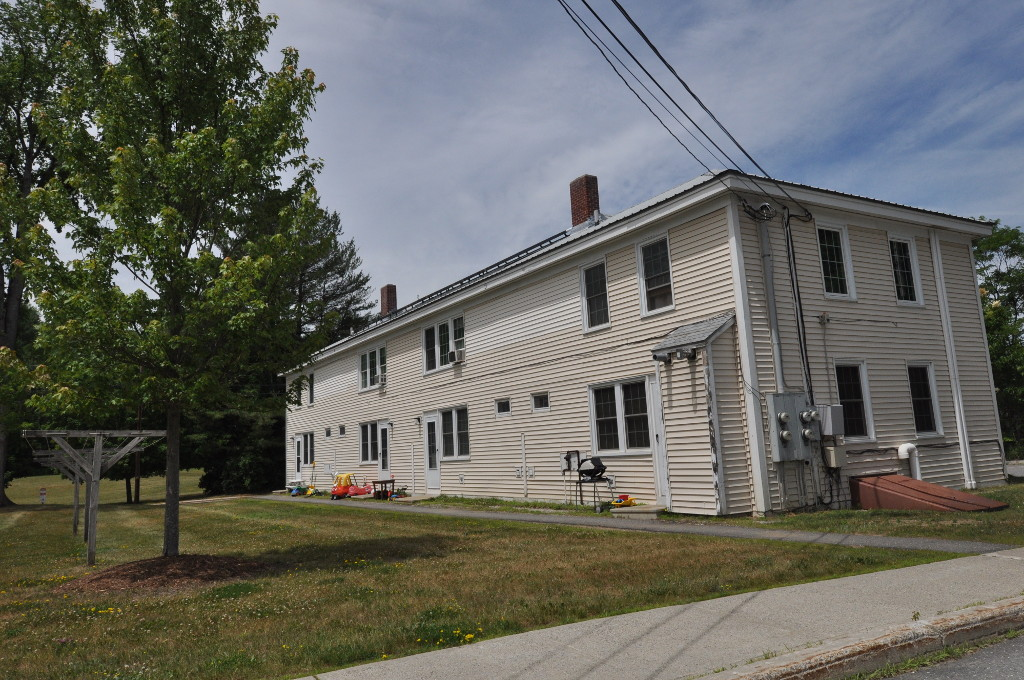

- Location within Vermont Location within the United States
- Location: 1-107 Stanley Rd., Springfield, Vermont
- Coordinates: 43°17′6″N 72°28′35″W
- Area: 6.9 acres (2.8 ha)
- Built: 1942
- Architect: Leland & Larsen; et.al.
- Architectural style: International Style, Colonial Revival
- NRHP reference No.: 07001171
- Added to NRHP: November 8, 2007

The Southview Housing Historic District encompasses a collection of World War II-era residences on Stanley Road in Springfield, Vermont. They were built in 1942 to provided housing for workers producing militarily important materials, and have survived with remarkably little alteration since then. They were listed on the National Register of Historic Places in 2007.

== Description and history ==
The Southview Housing district is located on the southern side of the town center of Springfield, between South Street and the Black River. Extending south from Stanley Street's junction with South Street are eighteen wood frame multi-unit residential buildings. Fifteen are two stories in height, with hip roofs and vinyl siding, while the other three are single-story buildings with novelty siding and gabled roofs. Most of the buildings on the west side of Stanley Street are arrayed perpendicular to the street, while those on the east side are arrayed parallel to it. Each building houses either three or four residences, most of which are two-story duplex style units.

The development was erected in 1942, after the federal government took the land (a farm at the time) by eminent domain. They were built to house workers at several of Springfield's precision machinery manufacturers, who were producing equipment critical to the production of military hardware. It was one of two such developments built by the government in Springfield; the other, called Westview, survives only in significantly altered form.

== See also ==
- National Register of Historic Places listings in Windsor County, Vermont
