= Augustus and Laura Blaisdell House =

Historic house in Vermont, United States

- U.S. National Register of Historic Places
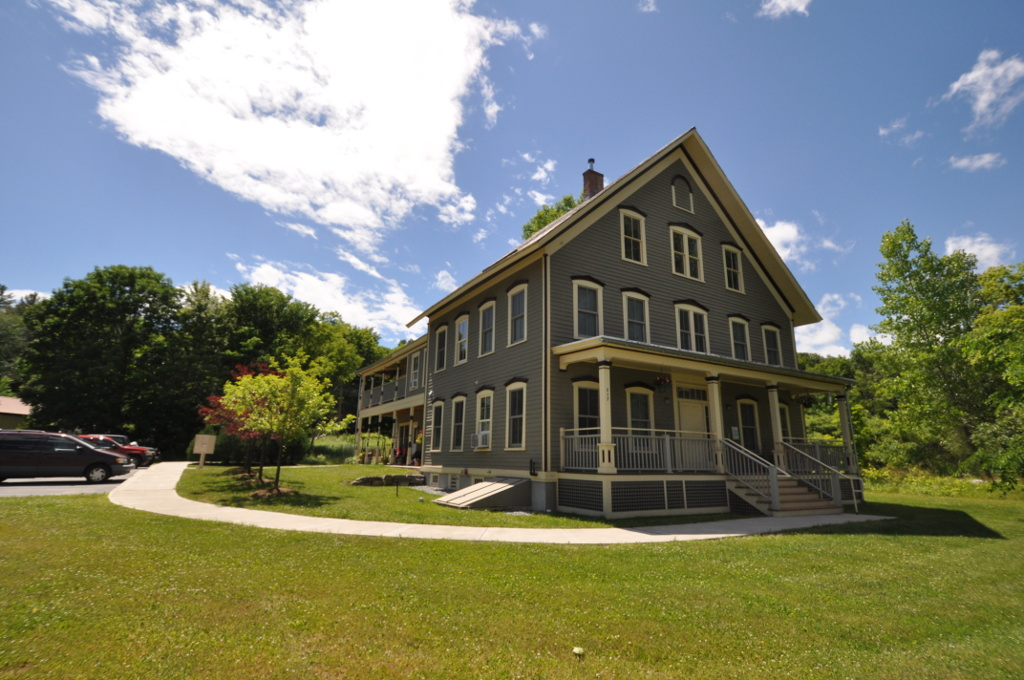

- Location within Vermont Location within the United States
- Location: 517 Depot St., Chester, Vermont
- Coordinates: 43°16′2″N 72°35′24″W
- Area: less than one acre
- Built: 1868; 158 years ago
- Architectural style: Greek Revival; Italianate
- NRHP reference No.: 13001132
- Added to NRHP: January 29, 2014; 12 years ago

The Augustus and Laura Blaisdell House is a historic house at 517 Depot Street in Chester, Vermont. Built in 1868 for a local businessman, it is a fine local example of transitional Greek Revival-Italianate architecture. It has historically served both commercial and residential functions, and now contains apartments. It was listed on the National Register of Historic Places in 2014.

== Description and history ==
The Blaisdell House stands in the village of Chester Depot, at the southwest corner of Depot Street and Railroad Avenue. It is prominently sited on a rise overlooking the village. It is a 2 1/2-story wood-frame structure, with a front-facing gable roof, clapboard siding, and a foundation of stone and concrete blocks. The main facade faces east, and is five bays wide, with three bays in the attic level. A single-story porch extends across the front, its posts set on pedestals and joined at the top by a valence. Windows on the front and sides are sash, topped by distinctive low gabled caps. Near the peak of the gable is a round-arch opening that has been enclosed. A two-story ell extends to the rear of the main block. The interior of the building, now divided into multiple residential units, still retains a significant amount of period styling.

The house was built in 1868 for Augustus and Laura Blaisdell, natives of New Hampshire who moved here in 1860. The Blaisdells operated a company that manufactured fireproof roofing and paint at their home base in New Hampshire, and built this building on a prominent site in the village to promote sales, which were conducted from a storefront on its ground floor. The land and building were both owned by Laura Blaisdell, and were willed to Augustus upon her death in 1888. He closed the company store and sold the property in 1891. The building saw a variety of uses, at times exclusively residential, but often with a business component, for most of the 20th century. The house is architecturally distinctive in the village for its unique combination of Italianate and Greek Revival features.

== See also ==
- National Register of Historic Places listings in Windsor County, Vermont
