= McKenstry Manor =

Historic house in Vermont, United States

- U.S. National Register of Historic Places
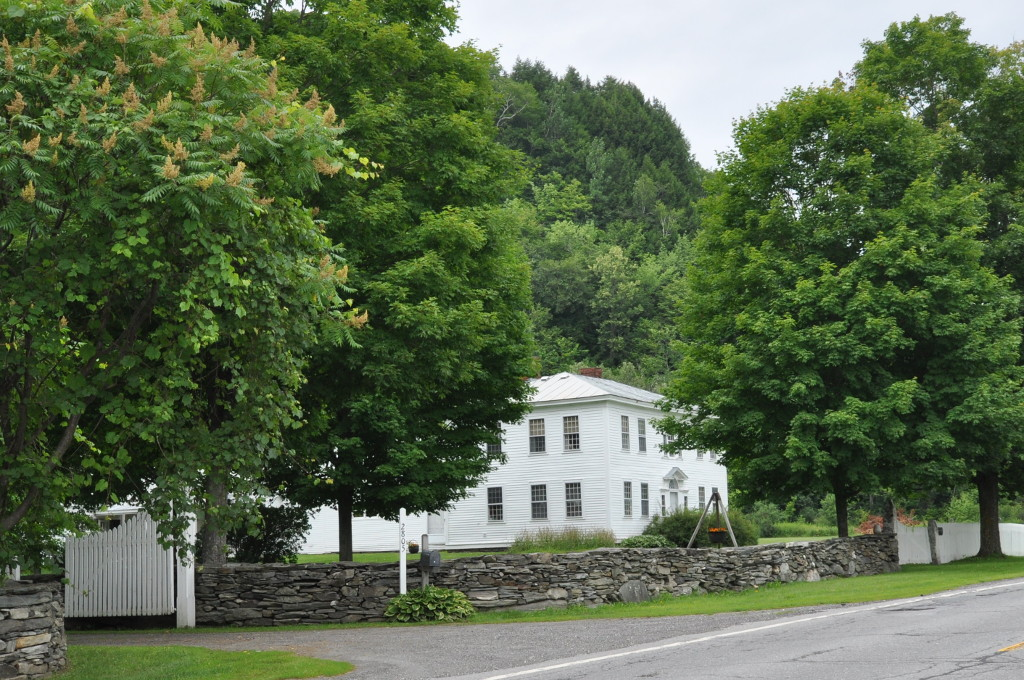

- Location within Vermont Location within the United States
- Location: VT 12, Bethel, Vermont
- Coordinates: 43°52′0″N 72°38′44″W
- Area: 385 acres (156 ha)
- Built: 1800
- Architect: Emerson, Joseph
- NRHP reference No.: 78000255
- Added to NRHP: December 1, 1978

McKenstry Manor, also known as the Kellogg House, is a historic house on Vermont Route 12 in northern Bethel, Vermont. Built about 1800, it is a well-preserved example of Federal period architecture in the town, built based on a published design of Asher Benjamin. It was listed on the National Register of Historic Places in 1978.

== Description and history ==
McKenstry Manor is located in a rural area of northern Bethel, on the west side of Vermont Route 12. Set on 385 acres (156 ha) originally associated with it, the house is a 2 1/2-story wood-frame structure, with a hip roof, clapboarded sides, and stone foundation. It is five bays wide and three deep, with its entrance centered on the east-facing facade. The entrance is flanked by sidelight windows and pilasters, and is topped by a half-round transom window and a broken gabled pediment. There is a keystoned Palladian window directly above the entrance. A 1 1/2-story wood-frame ell extends west from the main block, forming what is probably the oldest portion of the house. The interior retains original Federal period fireplace mantels and other features.

The oldest portion of the house, its ell, was built about 1783 by Alvan McKenstry, one of Bethel's leading citizens and owner of the Bethel House Hotel. About 1800–1810, McKenstry hired Joseph Emerson, a local master builder, to build what is now the main block of the house. Its design is based on large part on Plates 31 and 32 of Asher Benjamin's Country Builder's Assistant. The house's location is near what was once considered to be the town center.

== See also ==
- National Register of Historic Places listings in Windsor County, Vermont
