= Cavendish Universalist Church =

Historic church in Vermont, United States

- U.S. National Register of Historic Places
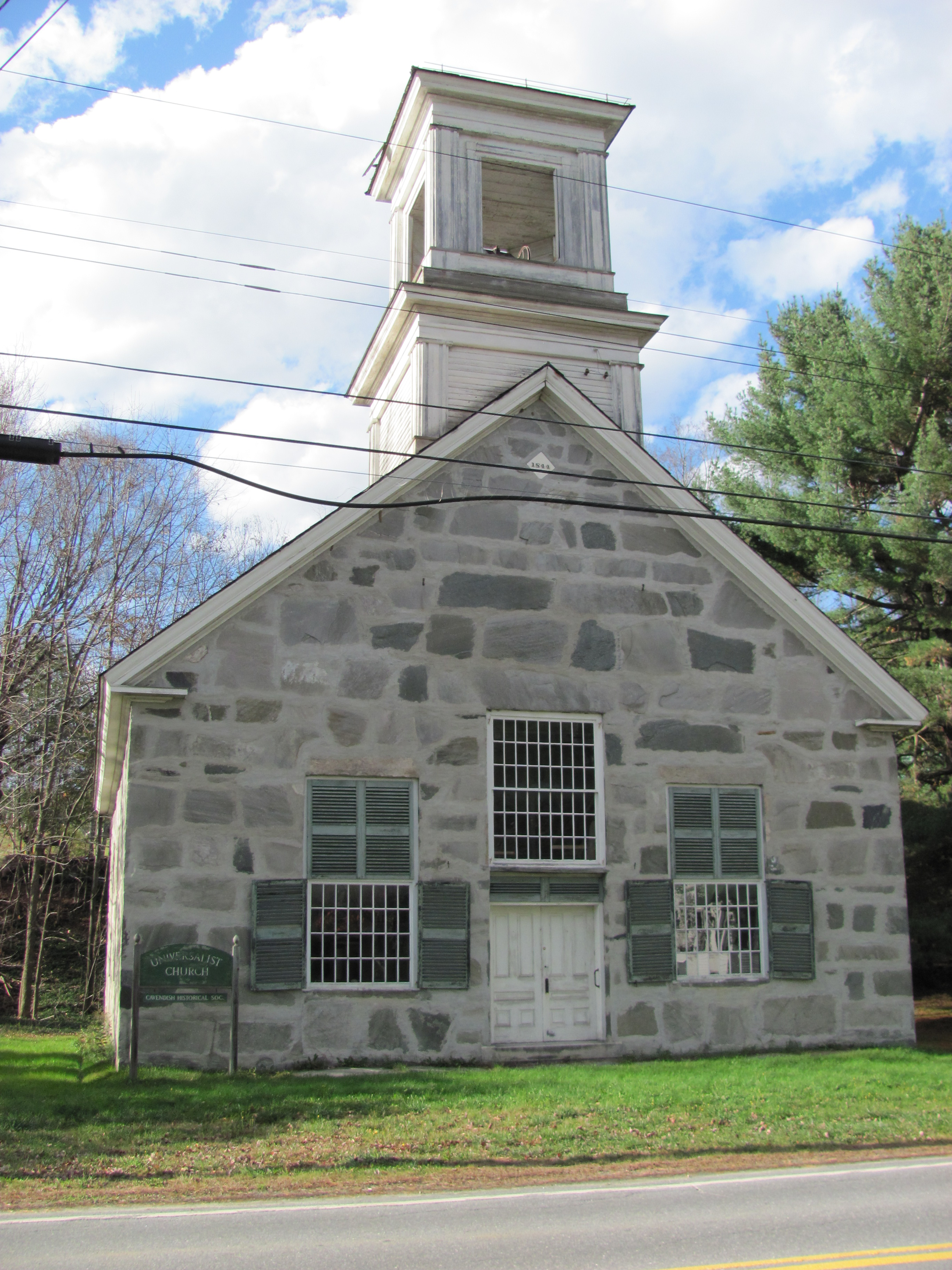

- Location within Vermont Location within the United States
- Location: VT 131, Cavendish, Vermont
- Coordinates: 43°23′5″N 72°36′22″W
- Area: less than one acre
- Built: 1844
- Architectural style: Greek Revival, Vernacular Greek Revival
- NRHP reference No.: 73000252
- Added to NRHP: April 24, 1973

Cavendish Universalist Church is a historic church building on Vermont Route 131 in Cavendish, Vermont. It was built in 1844 by Scottish immigrant stonemasons, using a "snecked" ashlar stone finish that is rare in the state outside the immediate area. The building was added to the National Register of Historic Places in 1973.

== Description and history ==
The Cavendish Universalist Church building stands on the north side of VT 131, just north of the Cavendish Baptist Church. It is a single-story structure, capped by a gabled roof and a two-stage square wood-frame tower with open belfry. The walls of the building are built out of local fieldstone, finished in a style called "snecked ashlar", laid in courses that roughly alternate been larger stone blocks and flatter slabs. The stone courses are separated by thick bands of mortar. The front facade is symmetrical, with tall multi-pane sash windows on either side of a double door, with a third window above. The principal visible stylistic elements are in the tower, which has pilastered corners on both stages.

The church was built in 1844, probably by Scottish immigrant stonemasons who had moved to the area ten years earlier from Canada. It is believed by local historians that this accounts for the unusual construction methods found in this building and others in the immediate area of southeastern Windsor County, the only part of the state where they are found. The building is now owned by the local historical society.

== See also ==
- National Register of Historic Places listings in Windsor County, Vermont
