= Fox Stand =

Historic house in Vermont, United States

- U.S. National Register of Historic Places
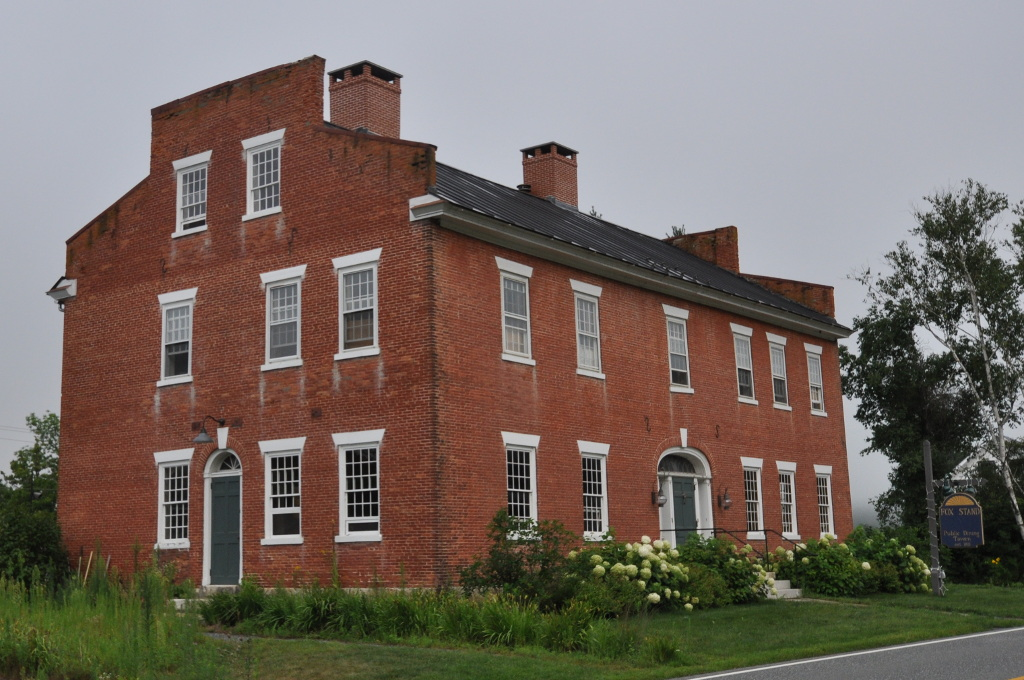

- Location within Vermont Location within the United States
- Location: 5615 VT 14, Royalton, Vermont
- Coordinates: 43°49′24″N 72°33′52″W
- Area: 3 acres (1.2 ha)
- Built: 1818
- Architectural style: Federal
- NRHP reference No.: 15000477
- Added to NRHP: July 23, 2015

The Fox Stand is a historic multipurpose commercial and residential building at 5615 Vermont Route 14 in Royalton, Vermont. Built in 1814, it served as a tavern and traveler accommodation on the turnpike (now VT 14) that ran along the north bank of the White River. It has been adaptively reused in a variety of configurations, most recently as a restaurant and dwelling for the restaurant's operator. It was listed on the National Register of Historic Places in 2015 as a particularly fine example of a Federal period tavern.

== Description and history ==
The Fox Stand stands on the west side of Vermont Route 14, at the southern end of the village of North Royalton, and just north of the bridge carrying Royalton Hill Road across the White River. It is a 2 1/2-story masonry structure, built of brick and set on a stone foundation. It has a gabled roof, with stepped gable ends and two interior chimneys. The main (east-facing) facade is six bays wide, with the main entrance roughly in the center, set in a keystoned segmented-arch opening with a transom window and sidelights. Sash windows are set in rectangular openings, with splayed stone lintels. The interior retains numerous period features, including fireplaces of brick and locally quarried soapstone, and two baking ovens.

The tavern was built in 1816-18 for Jacob Fox by Amasa Dutton, Jr., a prominent local builder. It was built to serve traffic on the White River Turnpike, opened in 1800, and as a social center for the community. Originally designed with a ballroom on the third floor, that space was used for local social events. In 1825 the tavern hosted the Marquis de Lafayette as he journeyed north to Montpelier. After the railroad was built through the area about 1850, the turnpike declined in use, and the tavern was closed. It was thereafter used for many years as a private residence, and was adapted for mixed commercial and residential use in the 1970s. It currently (as of 2015) houses a restaurant on the ground floor and an apartment on the second floor. The old ballroom on the third floor is intact but unused due to modern fire safety codes.

== See also ==
- National Register of Historic Places listings in Windsor County, Vermont
