= Gen. Lewis R. Morris House =

- U.S. National Register of Historic Places
- U.S. Historic district
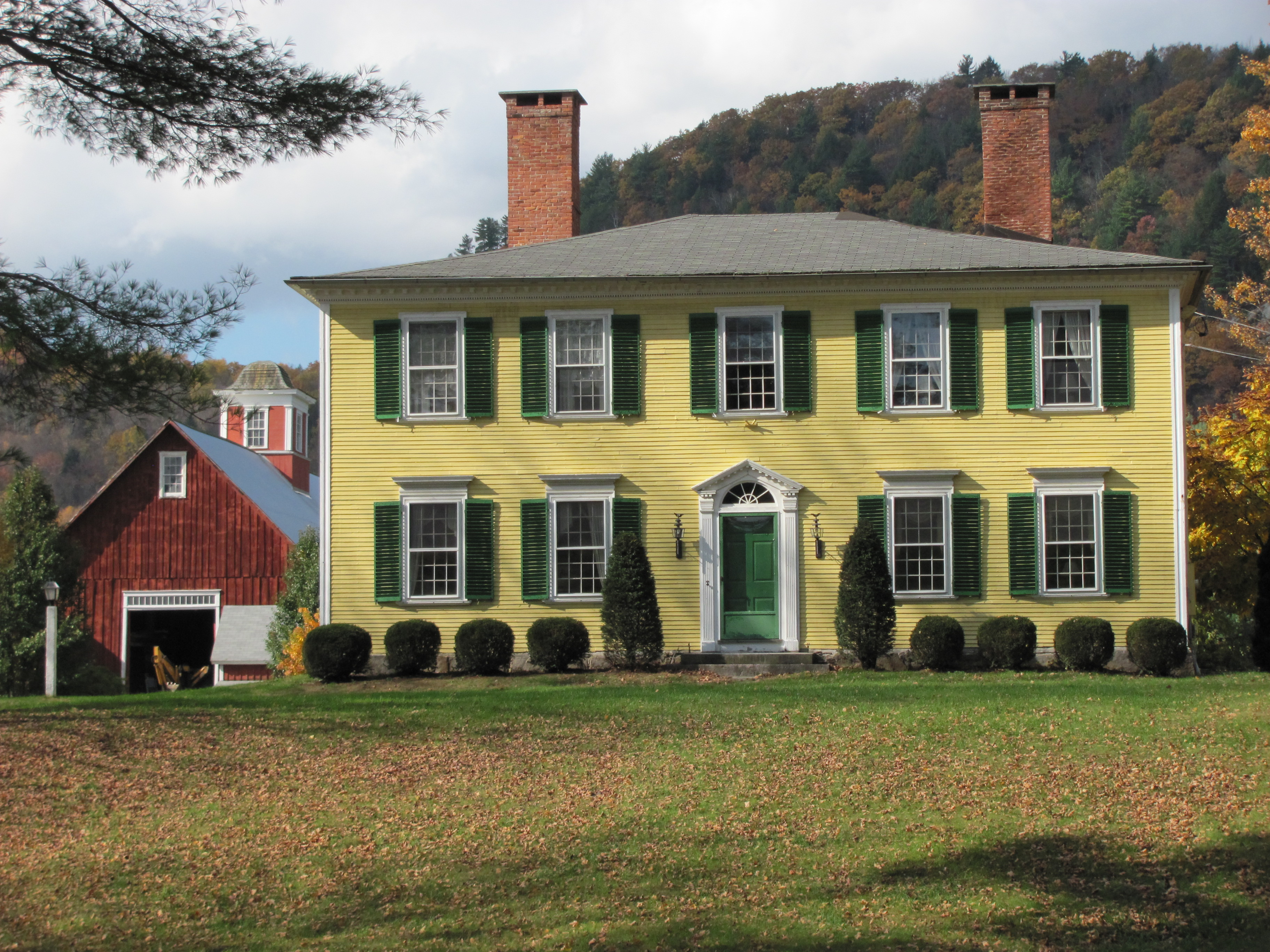

- Location within Vermont Location within the United States
- Location: 456 Old Connecticut River Rd., Springfield, Vermont
- Coordinates: 43°17′23″N 72°24′37″W
- Area: 72.6 acres (29.4 ha)
- Built: 1795
- Built by: Lewis, Samuel M.
- Architectural style: Greek Revival, Georgian, Federal
- MPS: Agricultural Resources of Vermont MPS
- NRHP reference No.: 92000813
- Added to NRHP: June 25, 1992

The Gen. Lewis R. Morris House is a historic house and farm property at 456 Old Connecticut River Road in Springfield, Vermont. Its main house, built in 1795, is well-preserved local example of Federal architecture with later Greek Revival features. The property also includes well-preserved 19th-century agricultural buildings, and was listed on the National Register of Historic Places in 1992.

== Description and history ==
The Morris House stands overlooking the Connecticut River in eastern Springfield, its informally landscaped lot separated from the river bank by Old Connecticut River Road, historically the main route along the river's west bank (since replaced by United States Route 5, which passes west of the farm property). The main house is a two-story wood-frame structure, with a hip roof and clapboarded exterior. The east-facing front facade is five bays across, with a center entrance flanked by pilasters and topped by a half-round transom window and gabled pediment. The building corners have narrow pilasters, rising to a dentillated cornice. The interior follows a typical Georgian central hall plan, with much original Federal period woodwork augmented by Greek Revival touches. The farm complex also includes 19th-century carriage and stock barns, and a large corn crib.

The house was built in 1795 for Lewis R. Morris, one of Springfield's early settlers and a veteran of the American Revolutionary War. The Morrises had extensive landholdings, some of which were confiscated due to the support of Morris's father Richard for the claims of New York for the territory that is now Vermont. Morris descendants owned the property until the late 19th century, when Leonidas Barry acquired it; he is responsible for a number of alterations to the house and the construction of several of the surviving outbuildings. Some of his alterations, notably the lengthening of its window bays, have been reversed by subsequent owners, in order to restore the building closer to its original appearance.

== See also ==
- National Register of Historic Places listings in Windsor County, Vermont
