= Luce Farm =

- U.S. National Register of Historic Places
- Location within Vermont Location within the United States
- Location: 170 Luce Drive, Stockbridge, Vermont
- Coordinates: 43°48′22″N 72°43′45″W
- Area: 207 acres (84 ha)
- Built: c. 1790
- NRHP reference No.: 100007219
- Added to NRHP: December 6, 2021

The Luce Farm is a historic farm property at 170 Luce Drive in Stockbridge, Vermont. The farm was established in the late 18th century, and is a well-preserved example of a rural agriculturally diversified farm property. It was listed on the National Register of Historic Places in 2021.

== Description and history ==
Luce Farm is located in a rural area of northern Stockbridge, with the farmstead on the south side of Music Mountain Road in a high valley northeast of the Stockbridge village center. The property consists of 207 acres (84 ha), with a combination of open fields and wood lots, including an 84-acre (34 ha) sugar bush. The farmstead is located atop a low rise, and includes the farmhouse and numerous agricultural outbuildings. The farmhouse's oldest section, one of its ells, dates to about 1790; the main block was added about 1839. Many of the outbuildings are 19th century in origin, including a corn crib, horse barn, dairy barn, and hops barn.

The area that is now the Luce farm was probably first settled about 1789 by Lot Whitcomb, who may have built the farmhouse ell. In the 19th century the property was owned by two generations of the locally prominent Twitchell family, who practiced diversified agriculture, producing hay, maple syrup and maple sugar, cheese, and a variety of produce. They eventually changed to raising sheep and growing hops. In the early 20th century, the property was occupied by Maurice Luce, and it remained in that family until 1995. It was sold to preservationists, who restored many of the buildings, and who maintain the property as a working farm.

== See also ==
- National Register of Historic Places listings in Windsor County, Vermont
