= NAMCO Block =

- U.S. National Register of Historic Places
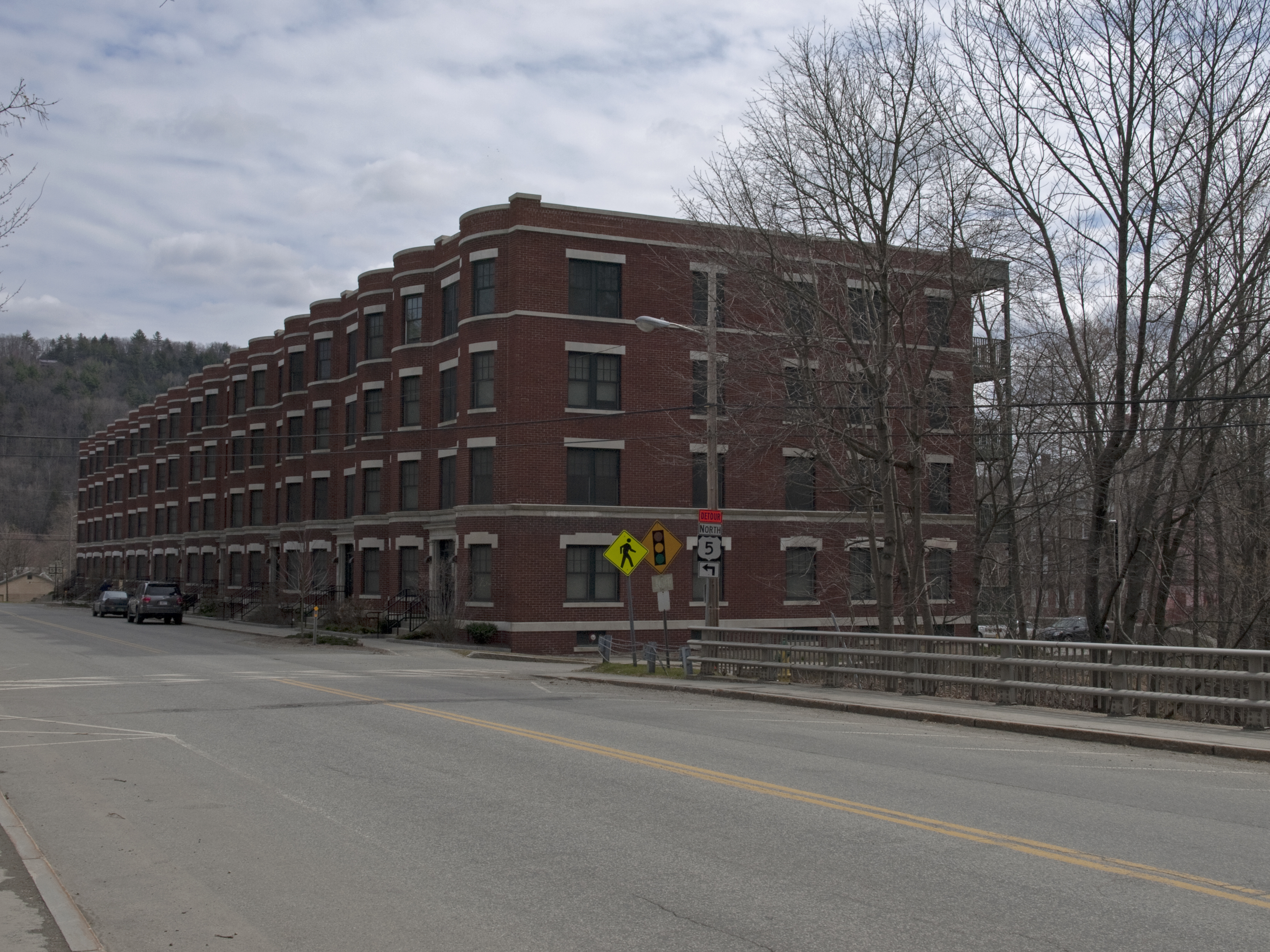
- NAMCO Block from Union Street

- Location within Vermont Location within the United States
- Location: 1-17 Union St., Windsor, Vermont
- Coordinates: 43°28′32″N 72°23′23″W
- Built: 1920-1922
- NRHP reference No.: 910016152
- Added to NRHP: November 14, 1991

The NAMCO Block is an apartment block built in Windsor, Vermont in 1920–1922. It was listed on the National Register of Historic Places in 1991 as an example of a large-scale company housing project. The building is located at the corner of Union and Main Streets, in the southern part of the historical center of Windsor.

== History ==
The National Acme Company (NAMCO), formed after the National Acme Manufacturing Company acquired the Windsor Machine Company, was the main employer in the town of Windsor between 1915 and 1930. The success of NAMCO was at a large extent dependent on its ability to attract the workforce from outside Windsor. The block represents the approach to urban settlement which is based on family housing in contrast to housing of single men, the predominant approach at the time.

The property on the northern bank of the Mill Brook, where the block is currently located, was purchased by the Windsor Machine Company in the late 1880s. A new plant was constructed nearby in 1909, and a club and a dormitory for the workers was constructed on the site. The club was badly damaged by fire and demolished in the middle of the 1910s, which caused a housing shortage. At the time, the number of workers at the plant was around 1600. The new apartment block was constructed in order to replace the lost housing. The location was chosen close to the plant as there was no public transportation in Windsor, and the use of cars was restricted in winter by the climate conditions.

The contract to build the block was awarded to Massachusetts-based L. A. Lafrance company and started in the spring of 1920. By the time of completion in 1922, the NAMCO block was the biggest residential building in northern New England.

In 1933, during the Great Depression, the Winsdsor facility of NAMCO was closed down. In 1989, the building was rehabilitated and currently hosts low-income housing.

== Architecture ==
The block is made of brick and has a flat roof. It is composed of nine identical four-storey buildings containing eight apartments each (two apartments at each floor), so that the whole complex contains seventy-two apartments. The buildings are separated by a fire wall. The main facade faces Union Street. The facade is separated into nine buildings as well, by using the bow fronts. Each individual building has an entrance from the main facade. Inside, the floors are connected by straight-run stairs. The building incorporates colonial revival features, including the red brick walls and flat-arched windows.

Most of the apartments consist of a living room, a dining room, a bedroom, a kitchen and a bathroom. The fourth-floor apartments are slightly different and have two bedrooms each. Two of the apartments have been adapted for handicap access.
