= Abbott Memorial Library (Pomfret, Vermont) =

- U.S. National Register of Historic Places
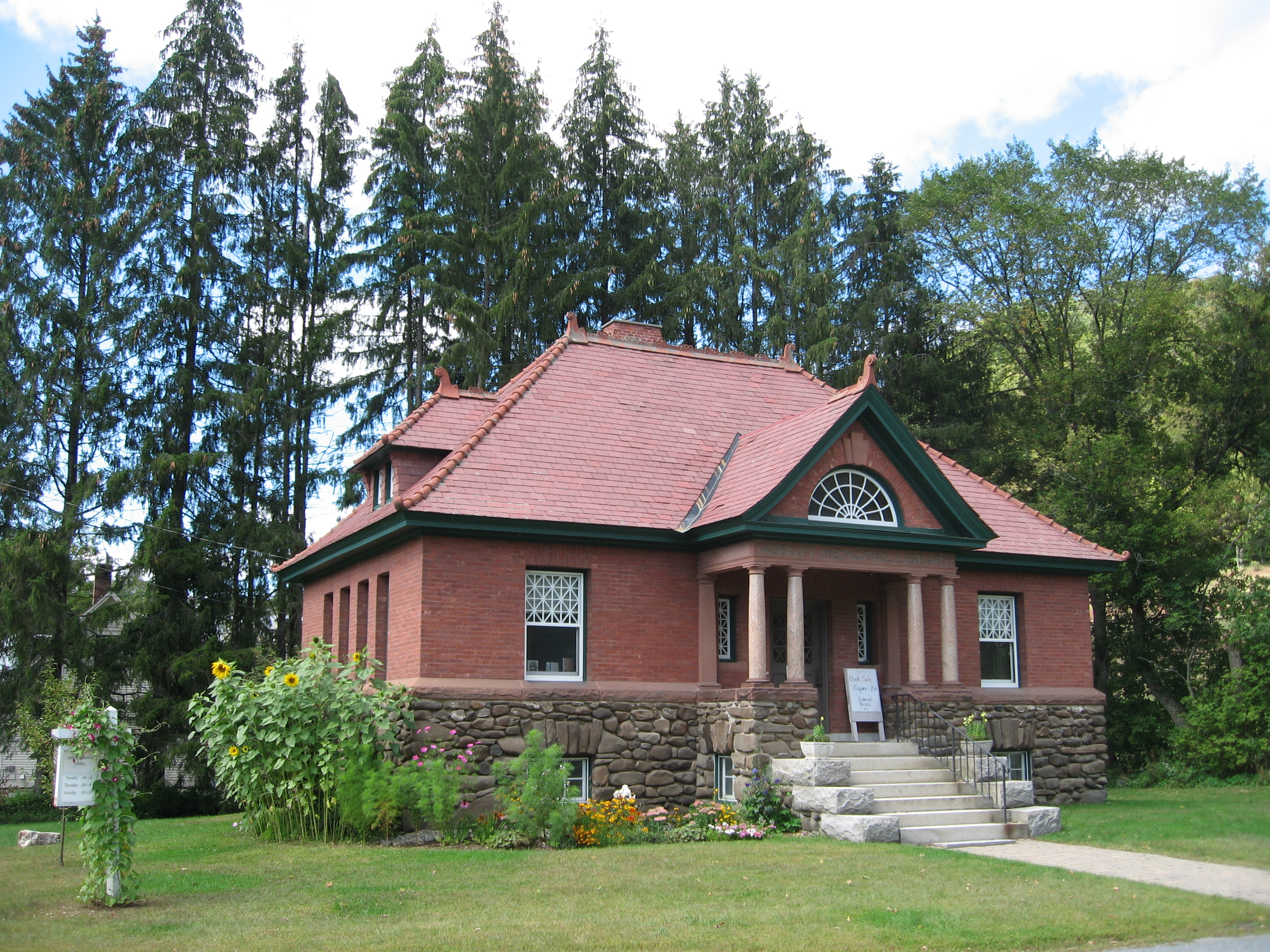

- Location within Vermont Location within the United States
- Location: 15 Library St., Pomfret, Vermont
- Coordinates: 43°39′54″N 72°32′21″W
- Built: 1903
- Architectural style: Queen Anne; Shingle
- NRHP reference No.: 14001141
- Added to NRHP: January 6, 2015

The Abbott Memorial Library is the public library serving the village of South Pomfret, Vermont. It is located at 15 Library Street, in an architecturally distinguished building constructed in 1905 through a bequest of the local Abbott family. The building was listed on the National Register of Historic Places in 2015.

== Services ==
The Abbott Memorial Library circulating collection includes books and media, and is part of the state's interlibrary loan service. Internet service is available at the library, and it has a meeting space available for community use.

== Architecture and history ==
The Abbott Memorial Library is located in the center of South Pomfret village, at the northwest corner of Library and Stage Streets. It is a single-story masonry structure, built out of brick and stone, set on a raised fieldstone foundation. It is covered by a terra cotta hip roof, with decorations at the crest, as well as at the crests of its hip dormers and the gabled entrance portico. Windows are sash, with the upper sashes having patterned glazing. The entrance portico is supported by paired Tuscan columns, which support an entablature and a gable with a half-round window in it.

The library was funded through a bequest made in 1903 by Ira Abbott, a prominent local attorney, which supported the acquisition of the land and the construction of the building. The library has had state accreditation since 1999, and is funded by a combination of public and private funding. It is overseen by a board of trustees.

== See also ==
- National Register of Historic Places listings in Windsor County, Vermont
