= Reading Town Hall (Vermont) =

- U.S. National Register of Historic Places
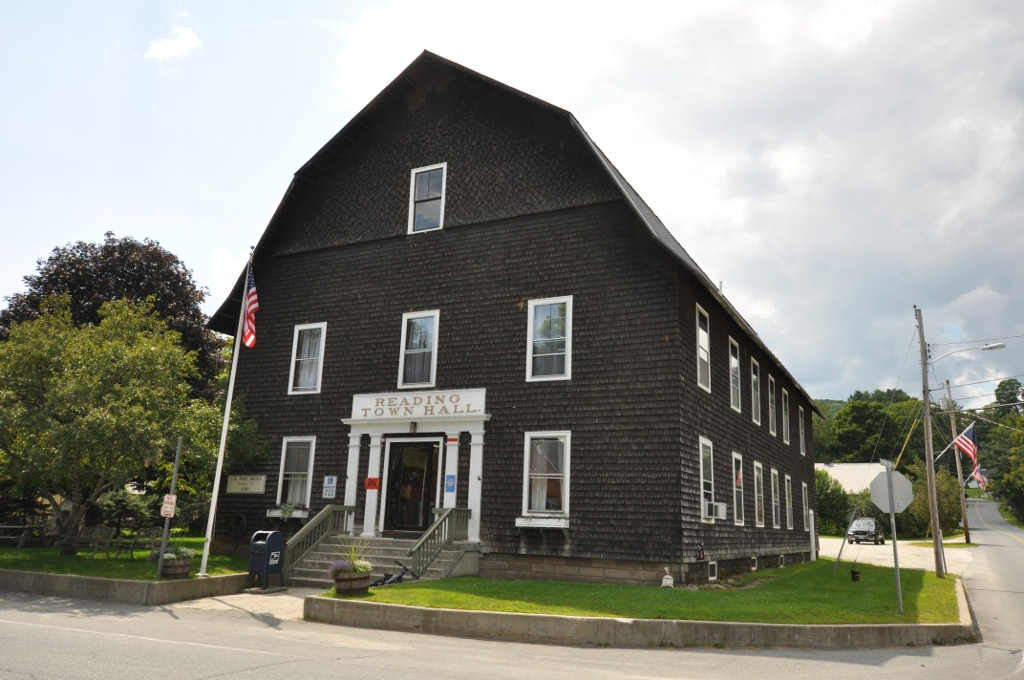

- Location within Vermont Location within the United States
- Location: Jct. of VT 106 and Pleasant St., Reading, Vermont
- Coordinates: 43°27′20″N 72°32′16″W
- Area: 1.5 acres (0.61 ha)
- Built: 1911
- Architect: Morse, J.E.
- Architectural style: Colonial Revival
- MPS: Historic Government Buildings MPS
- NRHP reference No.: 96000252
- Added to NRHP: March 7, 1996

Reading Town Hall, the town hall of Reading, Vermont, is located at the junction of Vermont Route 106 and Pleasant Street in the village of Felchville. Built in 1915 as a gift from a native son, the barn-like structure is a fine local example of Colonial Revival architecture, and has been a center of local civic activity since its construction. It was listed on the National Register of Historic Places in 1996.

== Description and history ==
Reading Town Hall stands prominently at the southwest corner of VT 106 and Pleasant Street in Felchville, the rural community's principal village. It is a large 2 1/2-story wood-frame structure, with bellcast gambrel roof, and an exterior clad in wooden shingles. The main facade faces east toward VT 106, and is symmetrical, with a centered entrance framed by paired pilasters and a corniced entablature. The entry is flanked by sash windows on either side, with three in the second story and one in the half story above. The interior has a large auditorium on the upper floor, with space for post office, town clerk, and a banquet hall on the ground floor.

The building was constructed in 1911, its funding provided by Wallace F. Robinson, a Reading native son who succeeded in business in Boston, Massachusetts. The building was designed by J.E. Morse of Springfield, and is unusual among the state's town halls for its barn-like appearance. Robinson in 1916 also provided the town with an endowment for the building's maintenance.

== See also ==
- National Register of Historic Places listings in Windsor County, Vermont
