= Vermont Route 10 =

State highway in Windsor County, Vermont, US

Vermont Route 10
- VT 10 highlighted in red

Route information
- Maintained by VTrans
- Length: 4.373 mi (7.038 km)

Major junctions
- West end: VT 103 in Chester
- East end: VT 106 in Springfield

Location
- Country: United States
- State: Vermont
- Counties: Windsor

Highway system
- State highways in Vermont
← VT 9	→ VT 10A

Vermont Route 10 (VT 10) is a state highway located in Windsor County, Vermont, United States. The western terminus of the 4.373-mile-long (7.038 km) road is at VT 103 in Chester and the eastern terminus is at VT 106 in Springfield.

== Route description ==
VT 10 begins at VT 103 south of the community of Gassetts in the town of Chester. From there the road winds its way eastward into the town of Springfield, where it terminates at VT 106 in North Springfield. The Hartness State Airport is located just northeast of the eastern end of VT 10 on VT 106.

== Major intersections ==
The entire route is in Windsor County.

Location	mi	km	Destinations	Notes
Chester	0.000	0.000	VT 103 – Chester, Bellows Falls, Ludlow, Rutland	Western terminus
Springfield	4.373	7.038	VT 106 – Springfield, Hartness State Airport, Perkinsville, Woodstock	Eastern terminus
1.000 mi = 1.609 km; 1.000 km = 0.621 mi
