= Aaron Jr. and Susan Parker Farm =

- U.S. National Register of Historic Places
- U.S. Historic district
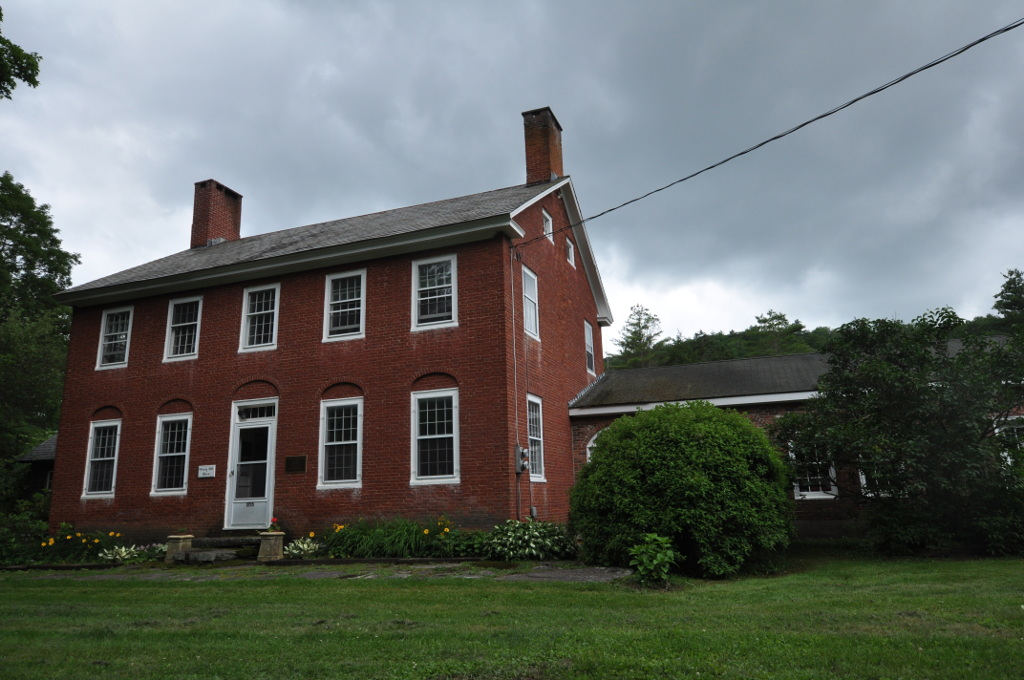

- Location within Vermont Location within the United States
- Location: 1715 Brook Rd., Cavendish, Vermont
- Coordinates: 43°25′11″N 72°36′36″W
- Area: 16 acres (6.5 ha)
- Built: 1795
- MPS: Agricultural Resources of Vermont MPS
- NRHP reference No.: 14000405
- Added to NRHP: September 24, 2014

The Aaron Jr. and Susan Parker Farm is a historic farm property at 1715 Brook Road in Cavendish, Vermont. Now just 16 acres (6.5 ha), the property includes a c. 1815 Federal style farmhouse, and a well-preserved early 19th century English barn. The farmstead was listed on the National Register of Historic Places in 2014.

== Description and history ==
The Parker Farm is located in a rural area of central northern Cavendish, on the west side of Brook Road about 0.5 miles (0.80 km) north of its junction with Atkinson and Center Roads. The farm's remaining 16 acres (6.5 ha) are roughly divided in half by the road, with a woodlot on the east side of the road, and a mown meadow and the farm buildings on the west side. The house, set near the road, is a 2 1/2-story brick building, with a side gable roof and end chimneys. The front facade is five bays wide and symmetrical, with a center entrance topped by a transom window. The first-floor bays of the front facade are all topped by blind arches. A modern single-story garage extends northward from the right side of the house, and an older wood-frame structure extends to the rear. The barn stands just northwest of the house, and is set further back from the road.

The oldest portion of the house, its rear ell, was built about 1795 by Aaron Parker Jr., the son of one of Cavendish's early settlers. Sometime in the 1810s, he built the brick main block to which it is now attached; this is based on stylistic evidence, as the blind arches on the front are a feature typically found only in Vermont houses from that period. Other stylistic elements of the house are clearly drawn from the published patterns of Asher Benjamin, a resident of nearby Windsor who published the nation's first architectural pattern book, the 1797 Country Builder's Assistant. The house remained in the hands of Parker's descendants until 1933.

== See also ==
- National Register of Historic Places listings in Windsor County, Vermont
