= Indian Stones =

- U.S. National Register of Historic Places
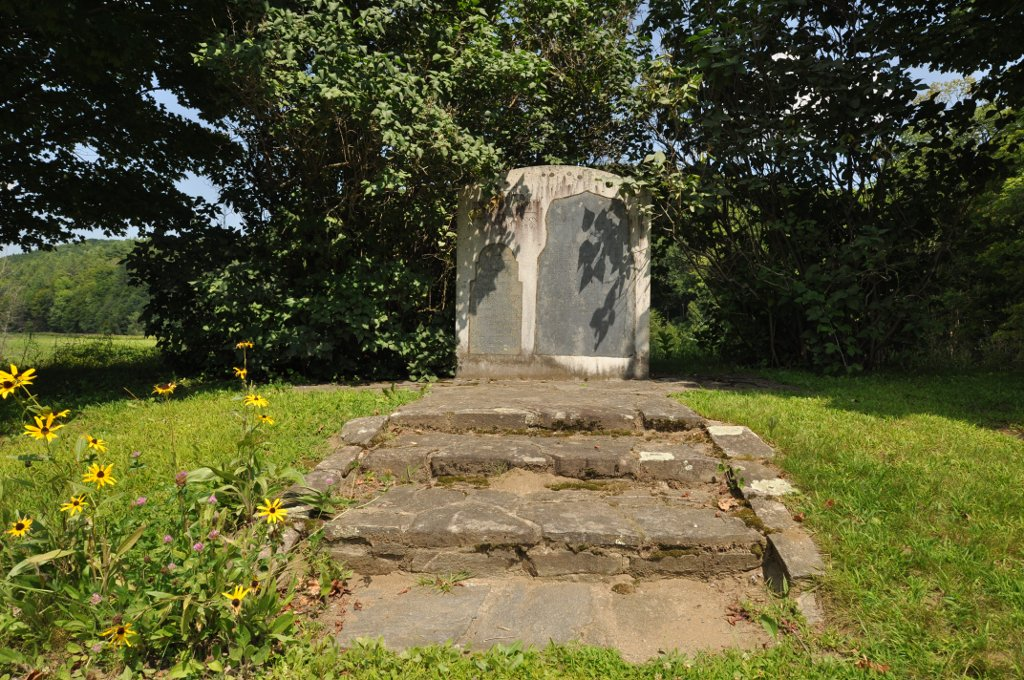

- Location within Vermont Location within the United States
- Location: VT 106 at Knapp Brook Rd., Reading, Vermont
- Coordinates: 43°26′47″N 72°32′7″W
- Area: less than one acre
- Built: 1799; 227 years ago
- NRHP reference No.: 74000356
- Added to NRHP: November 20, 1974

The Indian Stones are a pair of historic markers on Vermont Route 106 in Reading, Vermont. Erected in 1799 in commemoration of a 1754 Native American raid, they are the oldest commemorative markers in the state, and among the oldest in the United States. They were mounted in a single granite slab in 1918, and were listed on the National Register of Historic Places in 1974.

== Description ==
The Indian Stones are located at a small roadside pullout in southern Reading, on the east side of Route 106 at its junction with Knapp Brook Road. A set of three granite steps lead up to a granite slab, in which two slate markers have been mounted. The marker is framed by low bushes, with trees lining the eastern edge of the pullout, and a state commemorative sign placed in the oval created by the pullout. The granite slab is incised with the following in the upper lefthand corner: "- In 1918 - These stones were placed in their / present Position by a Descendant of - Captain / James Johnson"-and Susannah; his Wife." Below that inscription is a slate stone with stepped shoulders, in which is carved "On the 31 st of August 1754, Capt James Johnson had / a Daughter born on this Spot of Ground, being / Captivated with his whole Family by the Indians." Depictions of various tools top the statement. To that stone's right is set the other slate slab, in which is carved the following inscription, accompanied by similar decoration: "This is near the Spot that the Indians Encamp^ / the Night after they took Mr Johnson 8 Family, / Mr Labarree & Farnsworth, August 30th 1754, and / Mrs Johnson was Delivered of her Child Half a mile up this Brook; // When troubles near the Lord is- kind, / He hears the Captives crys. / He can subdue the Savage mind, / And learn it sympathy."

== History ==
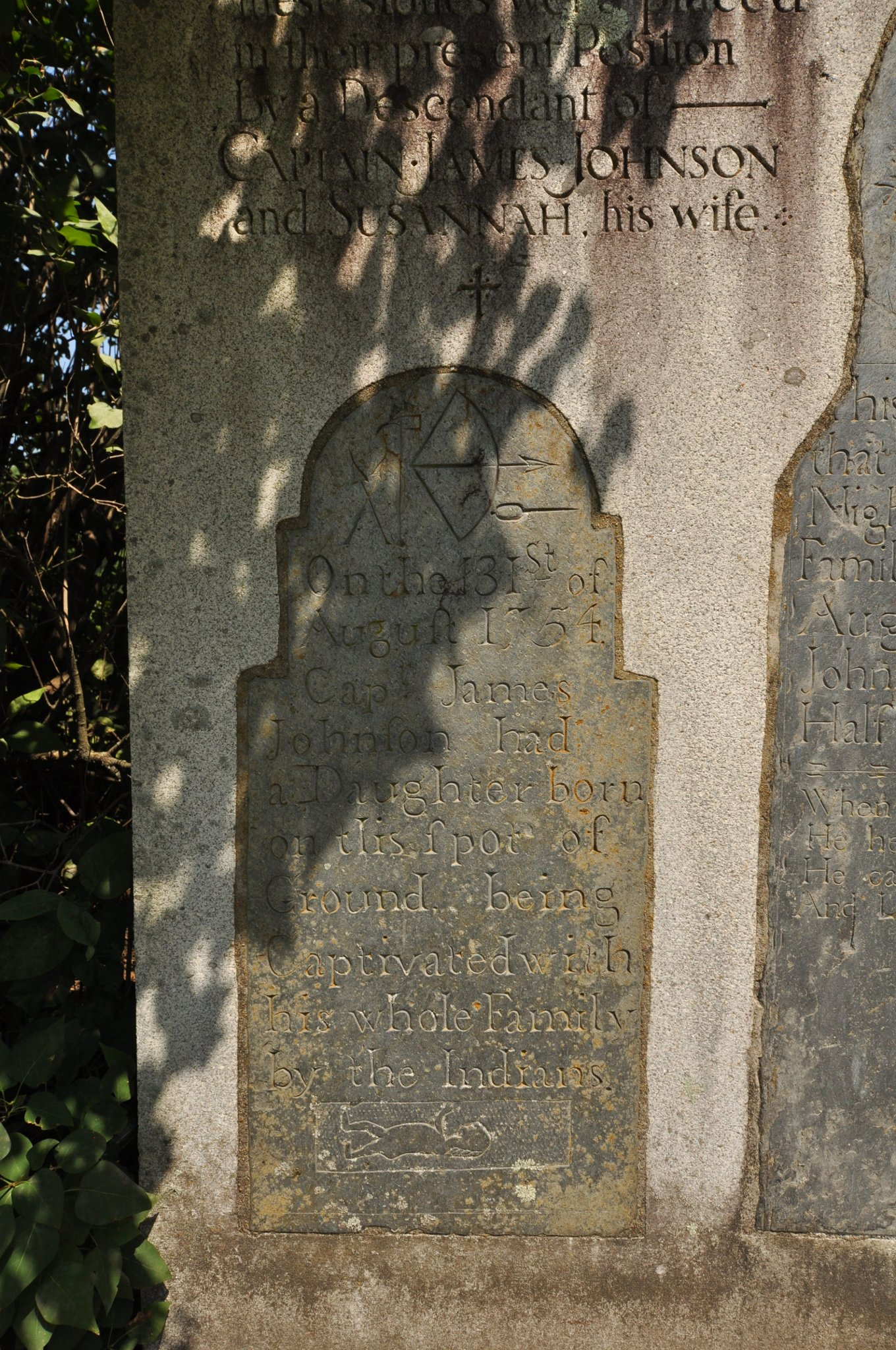
The left slate marker

On August 29, 1754, during the French and Indian War, a band of Native Americans made an attack on the Fort at Number 4 in Charlestown, New Hampshire, taking as captives members of the Johnson and Farnsworth families. On the second day of a forced march, Susannah Willard Johnson gave birth to Elizabeth Captive Johnson. All of the captives were eventually ransomed to French residents of Montreal and returned to their homes by 1760. Susannah Johnson returned to the place of her daughter's birth on several occasions, and in 1796 published a captivity narrative describing the family's ordeal. In 1799, convinced she had found the correct location, she hired a stonecutter to create the two slate markers, with the intent that one was to be placed at the birthplace, and the other at the nearby Native encampment site.

The exact date of their placement is not documented, but was probably before Susannah Johnson died in 1810. Susannah Johnson's instructions were not followed, and the two stones were placed side-by-side in a location not far from their present site. Descendants of Johnson in 1918 had the two stones mounted in the granite slab, and placed at the same site. The present location is near that location, created as a result of road improvements on Route 106 that required the memorial's relocation.

== See also ==
- National Register of Historic Places listings in Windsor County, Vermont
