= Vermont Route 106 =

State highway in Windsor County, Vermont, US

Vermont Route 106
- VT 106 highlighted in red

Route information
- Maintained by VTrans
- Length: 25.963 mi (41.783 km)

Major junctions
- South end: VT 11 in Springfield
- VT 10 in Springfield; VT 44 in Reading
- North end: US 4 in Woodstock

Location
- Country: United States
- State: Vermont
- Counties: Windsor

Highway system
- State highways in Vermont
← VT 105A	→ VT 107

Vermont Route 106 (VT 106) is a 25.963-mile-long (41.783 km) north–south state highway in Windsor County, Vermont, United States. The route begins at an intersection with VT 11 in the town of Springfield and runs along the Black River for several miles, crossing through Weathersfield, Reading and Woodstock before reaching the village of Woodstock, where it ends at a junction with U.S. Route 4 (US 4).

== Route description ==
VT 106 begins at a forked intersection with VT 11 (River Street / Chester Road) in the town of Springfield. VT 106 proceeds northwest as River Street, running along the shores of the Black River, past St. Mary's Oakland Cemetery as a two-lane commercial road. Crossing through an industrial section of Springfield, the route crosses over the Black River, which turns to the northeast near Main Street NS. After crossing the Black River, the River Street moniker is dropped, and the route turns west just south of Hartness State Airport. At the end of the western turn, VT 106 turns north while its former right-of-way becomes VT 10, which begins at the intersection. VT 106 continues north through Springfield, passing multiple residences on both sides and reaching a junction with Airport Road, which connects back to Hartness State.

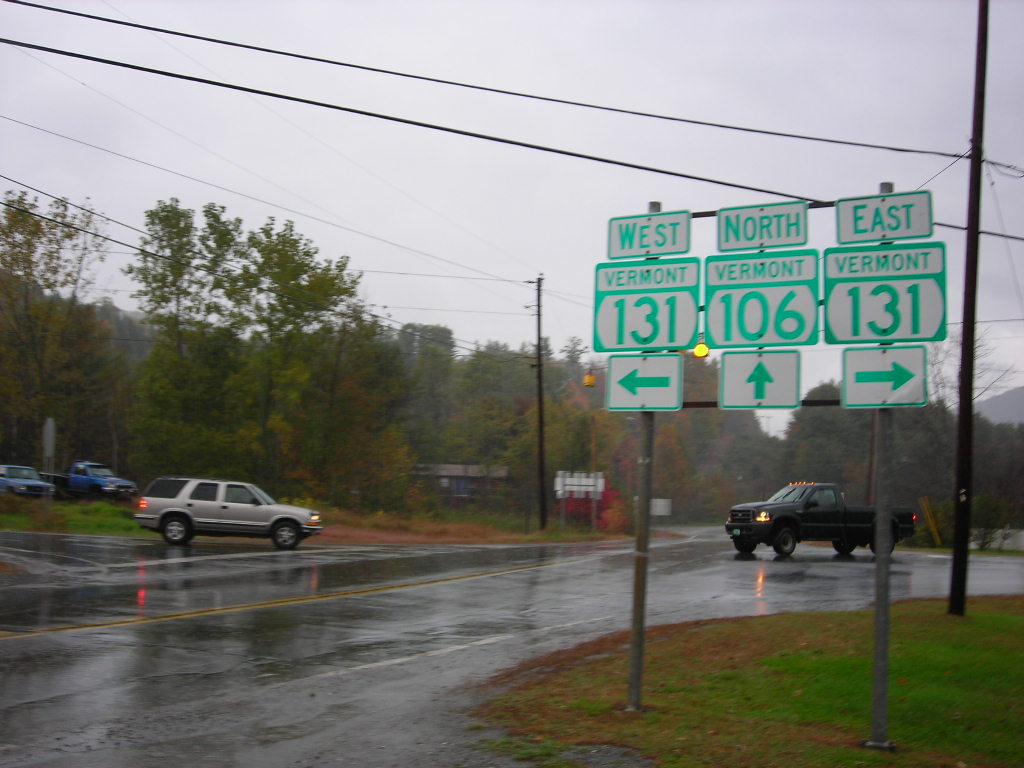
VT 106 at VT 131 in Weathersfield

VT 106 crosses into Weathersfield, continuing north past multiple residences and soon reaching the village of Perkinsville. In Perkinsville, VT 106 becomes the main north–south thoroughfare, passing multiple residences before crossing over the Black River once again. Paralleling the river, VT 106 makes a gradual bend north out of downtown Perkinsville, running north into the village of Downers, where it intersects with VT 131. Continuing north, VT 106 parallels the North Branch of the Black River, bending to the northwest through Weathersfield into the village of Greenbush, which consists of a junction with Ascutney Basin Road. Continuing along the branch, the route crosses into the town of Cavendish and soon into Reading.

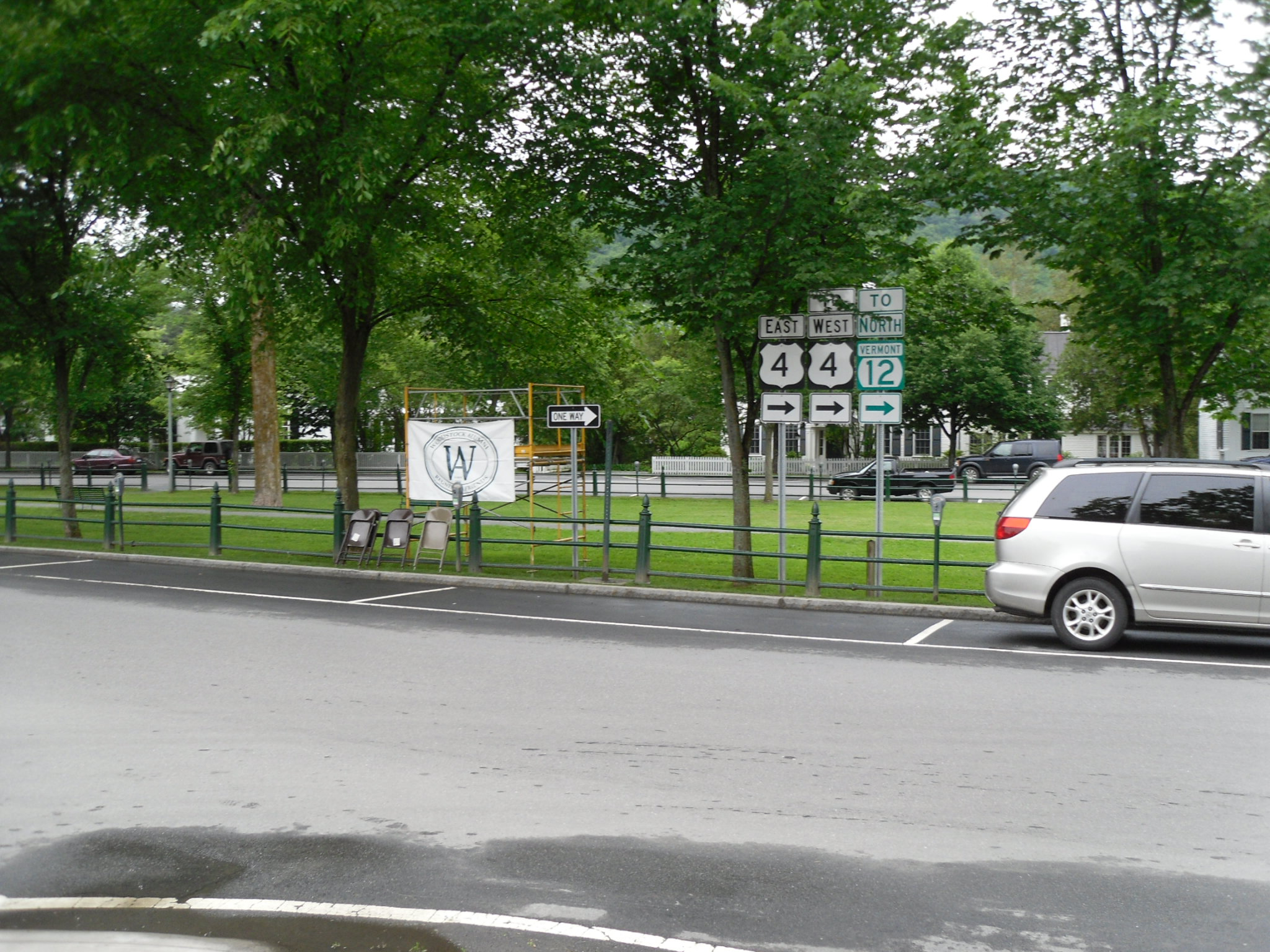
VT 106 at the junction with US 4 in Woodstock

Now in Reading, VT 106 bends north into the village of Felchville, where it runs as the main north–south road, passing homes in both directions and an intersection with Tyson Road. Leaving Felchville, VT 106 bends northeast, reaching a junction with the western terminus of VT 44. After VT 44, VT 106 bends northwest again, crossing through dense woods through the town of Reading, reaching the village of Hammondsville, which consists of a few homes at a junction with Baileys Mills Road. VT 106 winds northward out of Hammondsville and passes through multiple woods on its way climbing through some hills. Soon gaining the moniker of South Road, the route reaches the town of Woodstock. VT 106 turns northeast through Woodstock, entering the rural sections of Windsor County.

At Morgan Hill Road, VT 106 turns northward and enters the village of South Woodstock. South Woodstock consists of homes on both sides of the road, while VT 106 turns eastward again, leaving the village and turning northeast near Bryant Road. VT 106 begins turning northward once again, remaining a residential road through Woodstock, passing the western border of Woodstock Country Club, which marks the entrance into downtown Woodstock. At the north end of the country club, VT 106 turns northwest, passing multiple businesses and homes before reaching a junction with US 4 (South Park Street) in the center of Woodstock. This junction marks the northern terminus of VT 106, whose right-of-way ends at the intersection.

== Major intersections ==
The entire route is in Windsor County.

Location	mi	km	Destinations	Notes
Springfield	0.000	0.000	VT 11 (Chester Road / River Street) to I-91	Southern terminus
Springfield	3.283	5.283	VT 10 west – Gassetts	Eastern terminus of VT 10
Weathersfield	8.103	13.041	VT 131 to I-91 – Cavendish, Ludlow, Amsden, Ascutney	
Reading	13.265	21.348	VT 44 east – Brownsville, Windsor	Western terminus of VT 44
Woodstock	25.963	41.783	US 4 (South Park Street) – White River Junction	Northern terminus
1.000 mi = 1.609 km; 1.000 km = 0.621 mi
