= Jenne Farm =

Farm in Vermont, United States

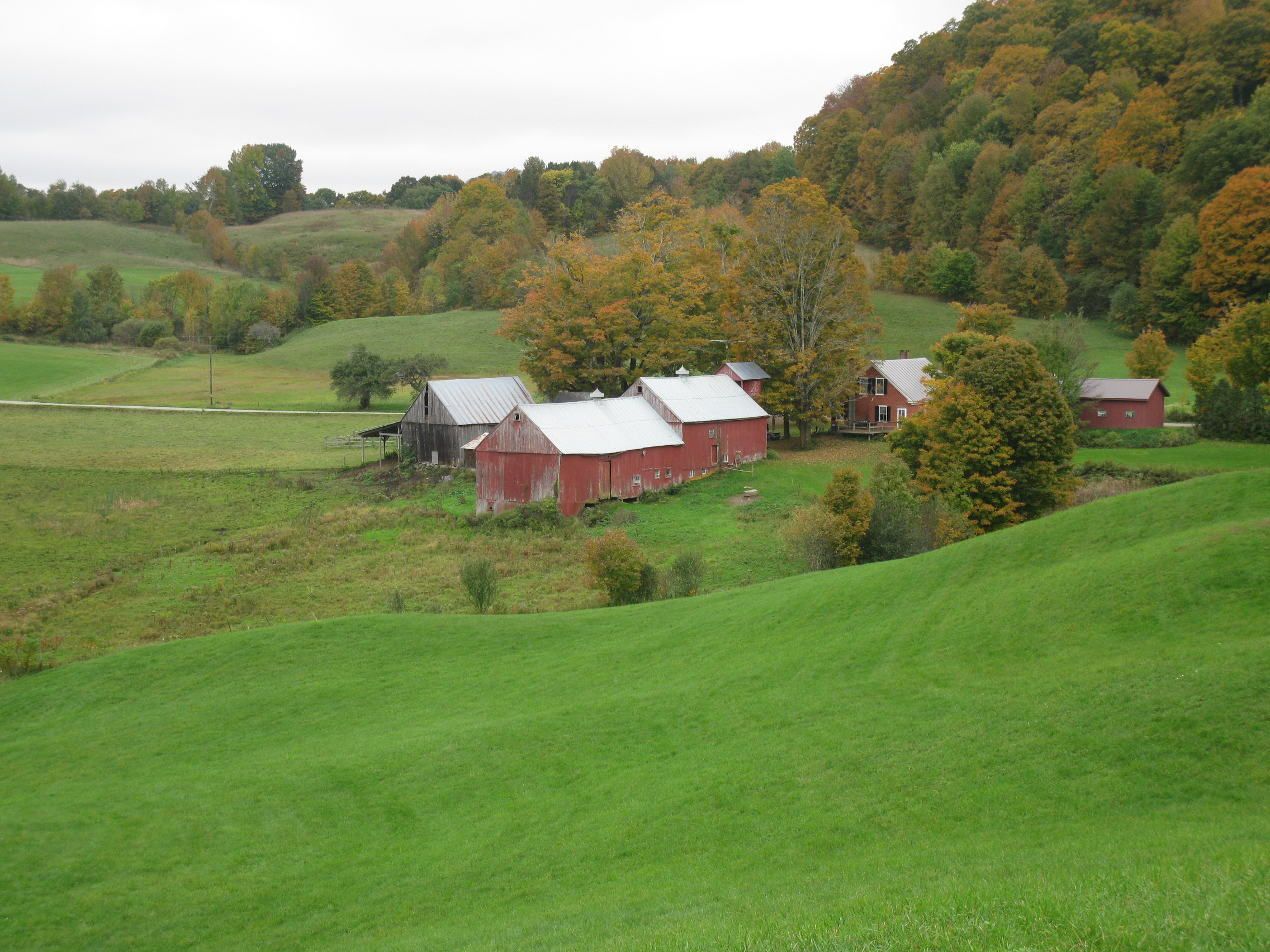
- Location: Reading, Vermont, U.S.
- Coordinates: 43.524538°N 72.55959°W
- Region served: New England

Jenne Farm is a farm located in Reading, Vermont, United States. It is one of the most photographed farms in the world, especially in autumn. The farm has appeared in magazine covers, photography books and several Budweiser television advertisements; it has also served as a setting in the films Forrest Gump and Funny Farm. Photographs of the farm have appeared on posters, postcards and wall calendars.

Despite its fame, the private farm is located along a dirt road and is not heavily promoted. The only sign indicating its presence is a tiny board along Vermont Route 106 advertising maple syrup.

The farm became noted for photogenic scenery around 1955, when a photography school in South Woodstock discovered it. Later, it appeared as an entry in a Life photography contest, on the cover of Yankee magazine and in Vermont Life.

As a result of being overrun by tourists trespassing on the farm, the town has closed the road leading to the farm to non-local traffic.

== Gallery ==
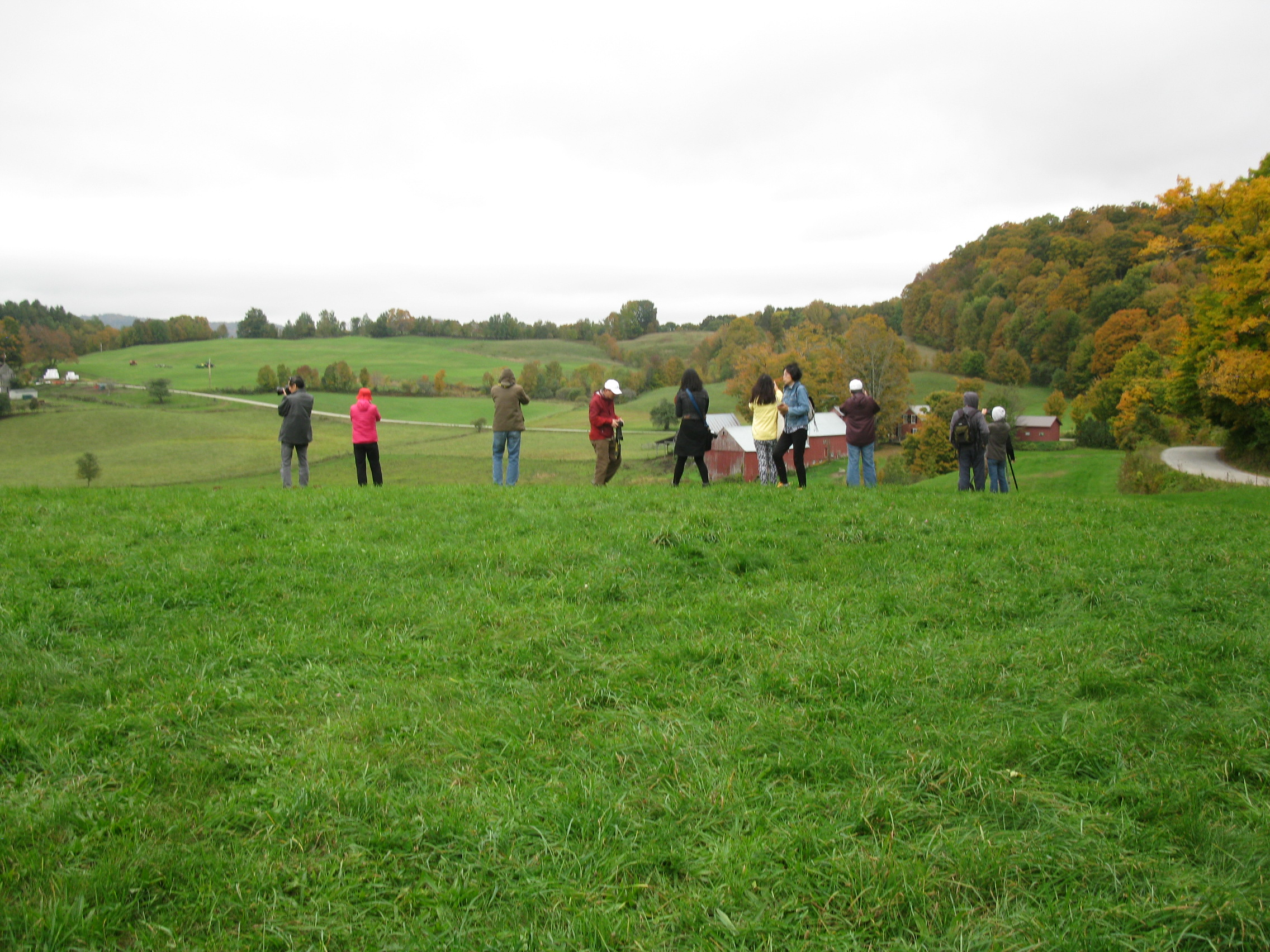
Photographers at the farm

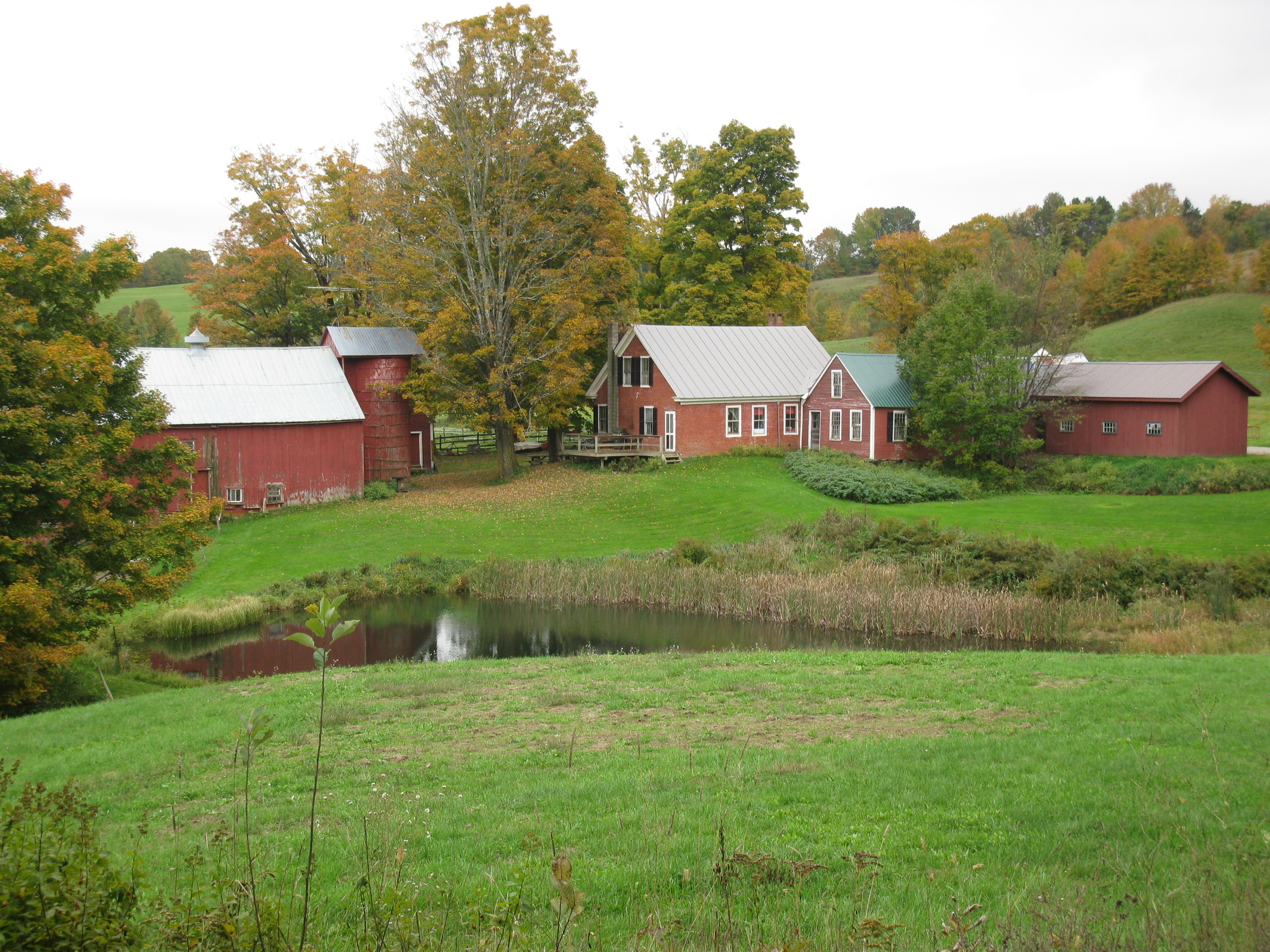
View facing south

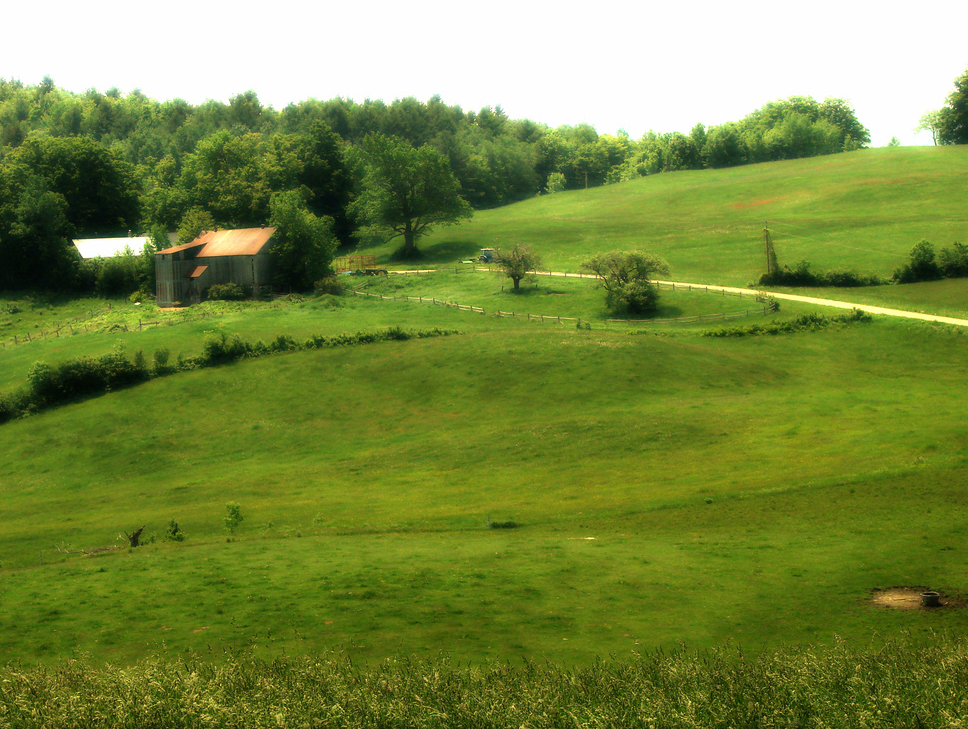
The farm in the summer
