= VT10 (disambiguation) =

VT10 may refer to:

- Torpedo Squadron 10 or "VT-10" was a torpedo bomber squadron of the United States Navy from 1942 to 1945.
- Training Squadron 10 or "VT-10" is a training squadron of the United States Navy.
- Vermont Route 10 or "VT 10" is a state highway located in Windsor County, Vermont, United States.
