= Vermont Route 131 =

State highway in Windsor County, Vermont, US

Vermont Route 131
- VT 131 highlighted in red

Route information
- Maintained by VTrans
- Length: 16.299 mi (26.231 km)

Major junctions
- West end: VT 103 in Cavendish
- I-91 in Weathersfield
- East end: US 5 / VT 12 in Weathersfield

Location
- Country: United States
- State: Vermont
- Counties: Windsor

Highway system
- State highways in Vermont
← VT 130	→ VT 132

Vermont Route 131 (VT 131) is a 16.299-mile-long (26.231 km) state highway in Windsor County, Vermont, United States. It starts at VT 103 in Cavendish and terminates at a junction with U.S. Route 5 (US 5) and VT 12 in the town of Weathersfield.

== Route description ==
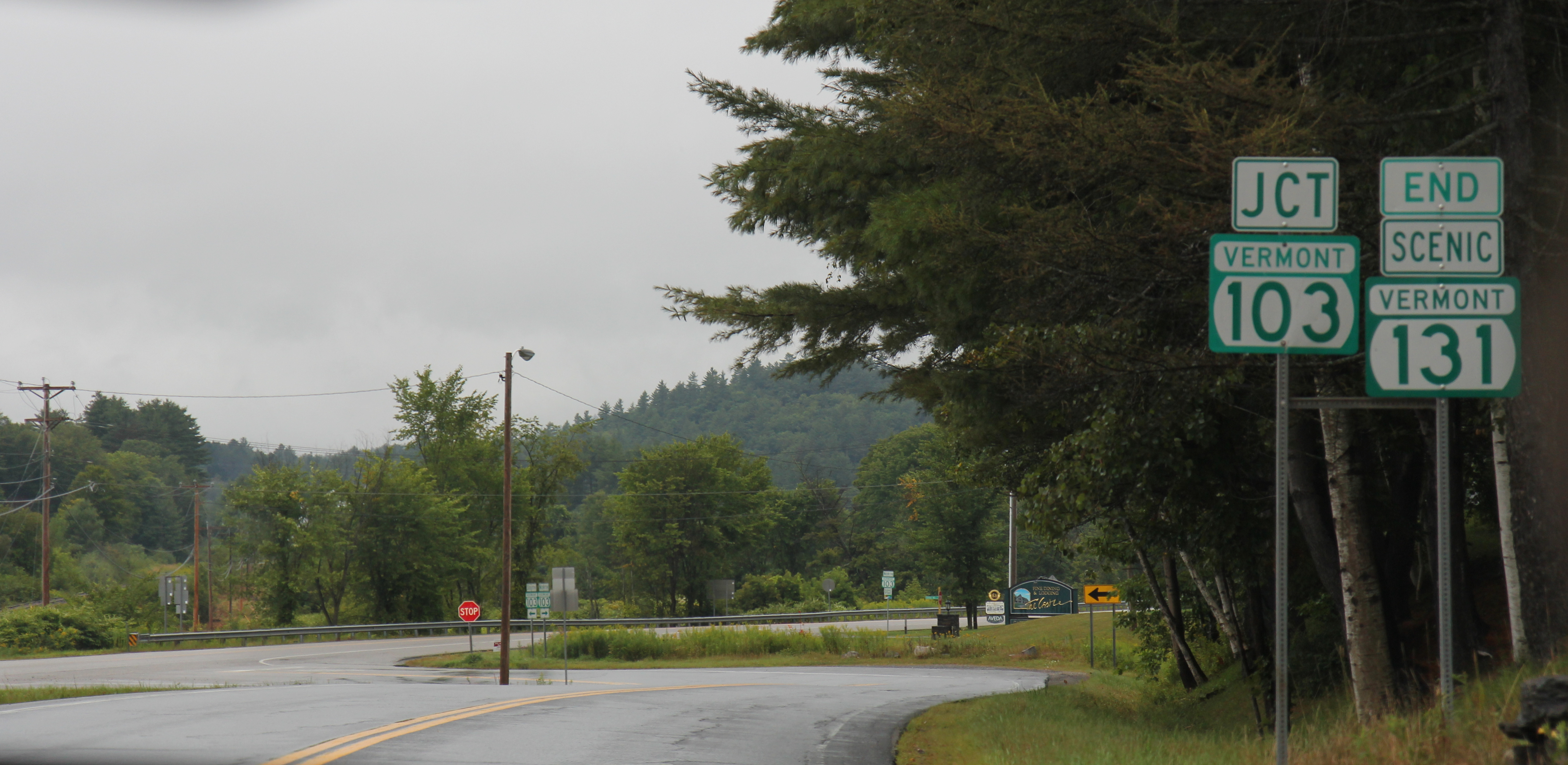
Western terminus at VT103

VT 131 begins at an intersection with VT 103 in the Windsor County town of Cavendish on the shores of the Black River. VT 131 runs southeast from VT 103 along Main Street in Cavendish, paralleling local railroad tracks as the main west–east road through the community. The route bends northeast in the village, passing a long string of residences, turning east at Twentymile Stream Road. Now paralleling the Black River, the route continues east through Cavendish, reaching the commercial center at a junction with Mill Street.

At Mill Street, VT 131 turns northeast through another residential sector of Cavendish. The route winds northeast through Cavendish, reaching the hamlet of Whitesville, a small community at the junction of Whitesville and Carlton Roads with VT 131. The route soon reaches Cavendish Center, a small junction at Brook Road, where it bends along the Black River eastward before turning southeast still along the river. After running south, the route soon bends east through the woods of Cavendish. VT 131 and the river bend northeast then east and entering the town of Weathersfield. In the community of Downers, which VT 131 almost immediately enters, the route junctions with VT 106.

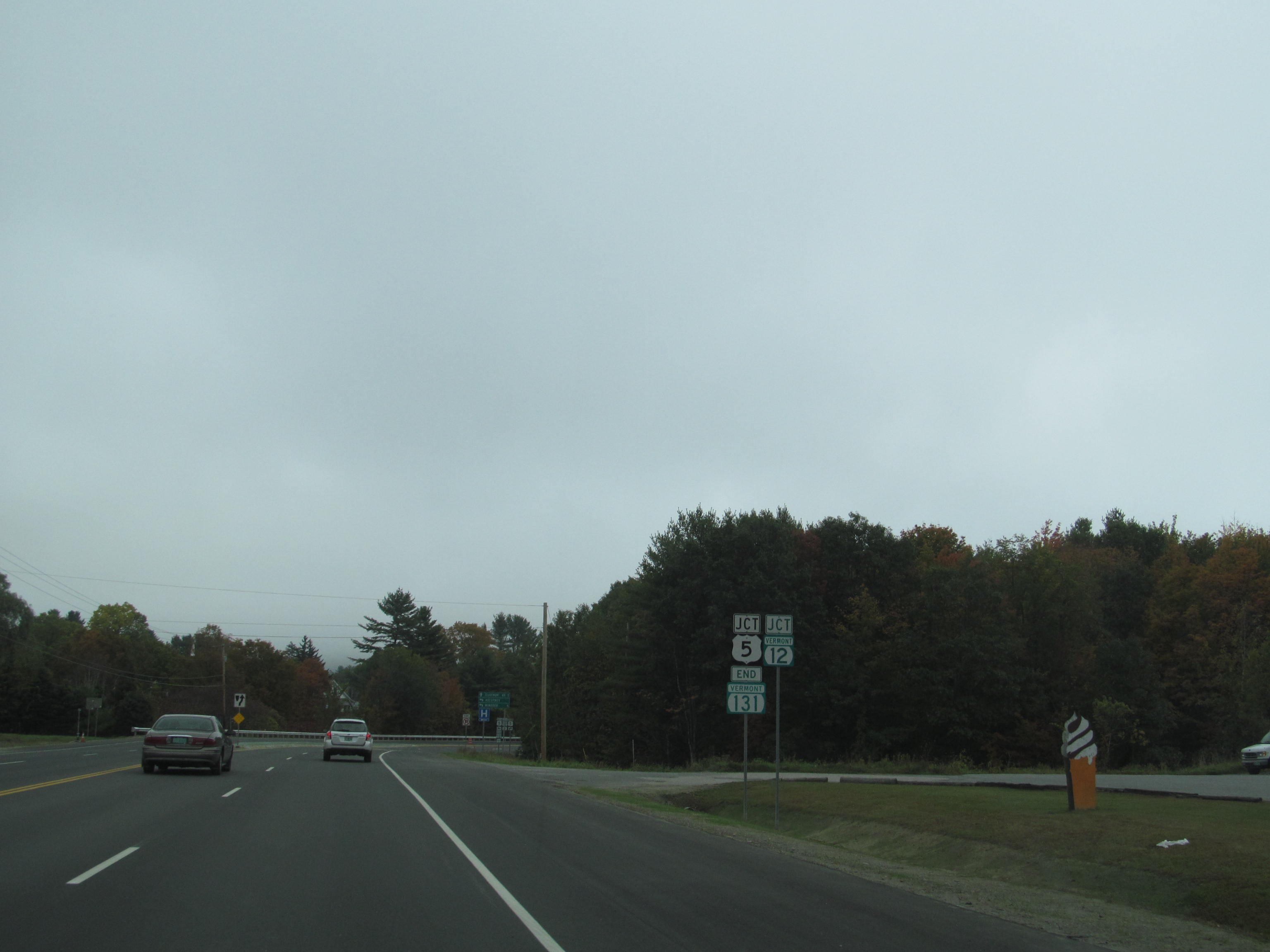
VT 131 at US 5 and VT 12 in Ascutney

After VT 106, VT 131 bends northeast out of Downers, paralleling the North Branch of the Black River, reaching the hamlet of Amsden. After a couple of turns, the route reaches Gulf Road, where it turns north again, running up a mountainside into a bend at Henry Gould Road. VT 131 then bends southeast, passing the other end of Gulf Road, soon reaching a junction with Weathersfield Center Road. Running down the hillside it climbed earlier, the route bends northeast into a diamond interchange with I-91 (exit 8) in Weathersfield.

After I-91, VT 131 becomes a divided highway as it enters the hamlet of Ascutney, reaching a junction with US 5 and VT 12 just west of the Connecticut River and New Hampshire, where VT 131's right-of-way becomes NH 103.

== Major intersections ==
The entire route is in Windsor County.

Location	mi	km	Destinations	Notes
Cavendish	0.000	0.000	VT 103 – Chester, Bellows Falls, Ludlow, Rutland	Western terminus; Village of Proctorsville
Weathersfield	8.974	14.442	VT 106 – Felchville, Woodstock, Perkinsville, Springfield	
Weathersfield	15.802– 15.933	25.431– 25.642	I-91 – Springfield, Brattleboro, Hartland, White River Junction	Exit 8 on I-91; diamond interchange
Weathersfield	16.299	26.231	US 5 / VT 12 – Ascutney, Windsor	Eastern terminus; Village of Ascutney
1.000 mi = 1.609 km; 1.000 km = 0.621 mi
