= Proctorsville, Vermont =

Census-designated place in Vermont, United States

- Census-designated place
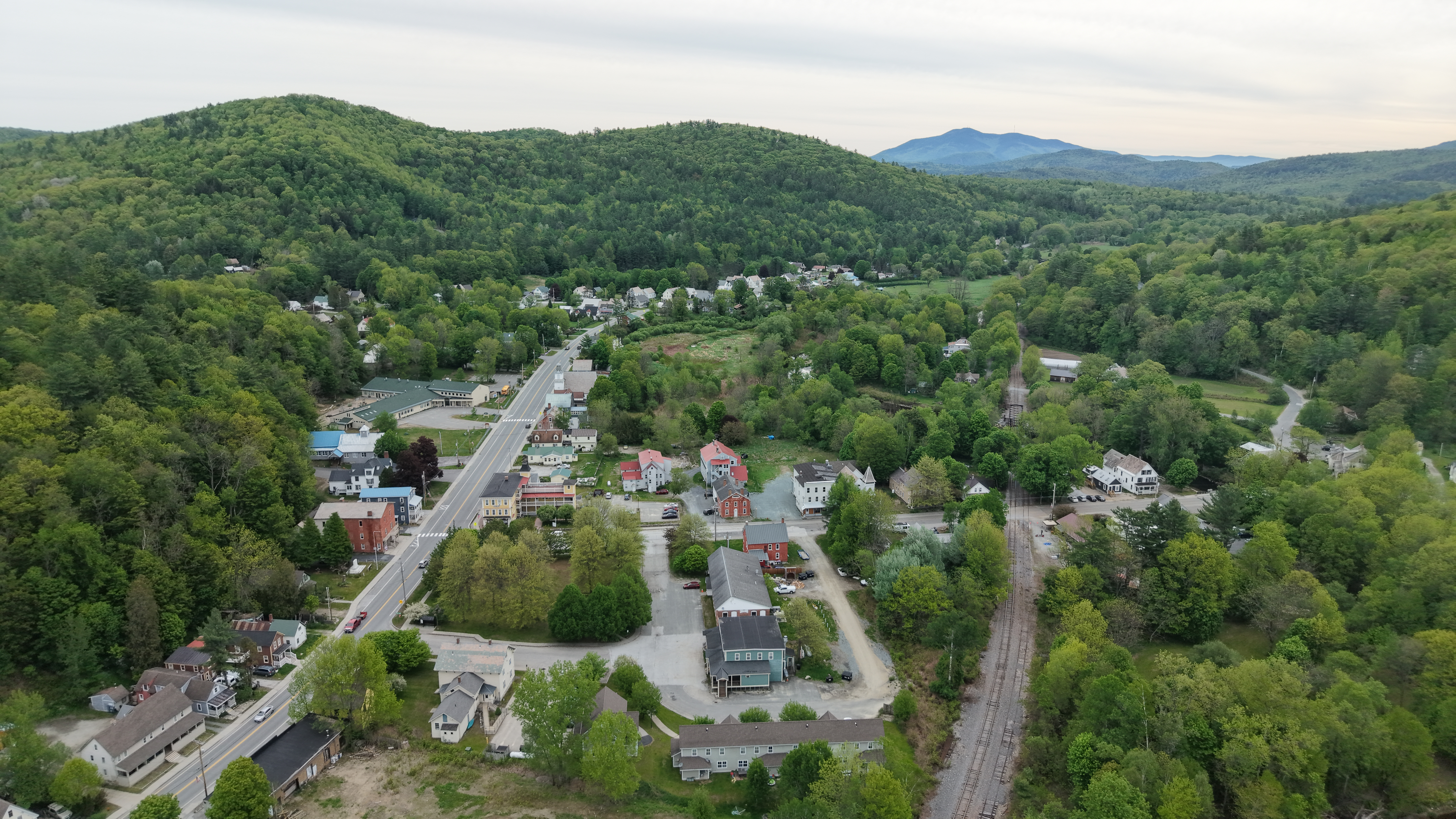
- Proctorsville, Vermont, from the southwest

- Location in Windsor County and the state of Vermont.
- Coordinates: 43°22′38″N 72°38′14″W
- Country: United States
- State: Vermont
- County: Windsor

Area
  - Total: 2.9 sq mi (7.6 km^{2})
  - Land: 2.9 sq mi (7.4 km^{2})
  - Water: 0.039 sq mi (0.1 km^{2})
- Elevation: 925 ft (282 m)

Population (2010)
  - Total: 454
  - Density: 160/sq mi (61/km^{2})
- Time zone: UTC-5 (Eastern (EST))
  - Summer (DST): UTC-4 (EDT)
- ZIP Code: 05153 (Proctorsville); 05142 (Cavendish)
- Area code: 802
- FIPS code: 50-57400
- GNIS feature ID: 2586648

Proctorsville is a census-designated place (CDP) in the town of Cavendish, Windsor County, Vermont, United States. As of the 2020 census, Proctorsville had a population of 451.

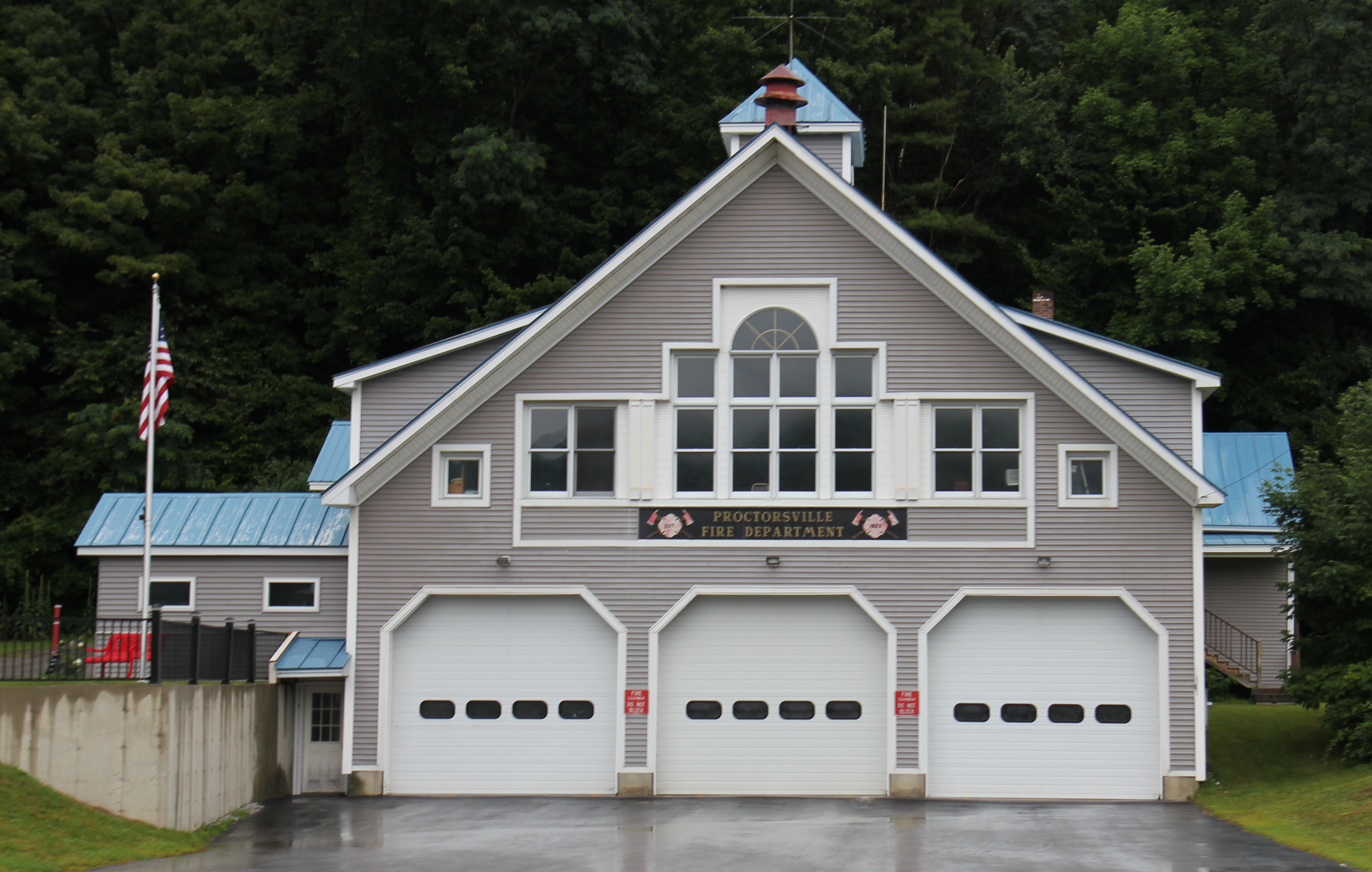
Fire Department

== Geography ==
The center of Proctorsville is located just east of the junction of Vermont Route 131 with Vermont Route 103, along the Black River. Route 131 heads east through Cavendish village towards Ascutney, while Route 103 travels west to Ludlow and south through Proctorsville Gulf to Chester.
