= Cavendish (CDP), Vermont =

Census-designated place in Vermont, United States

Cavendish, Vermont
- Census-designated place
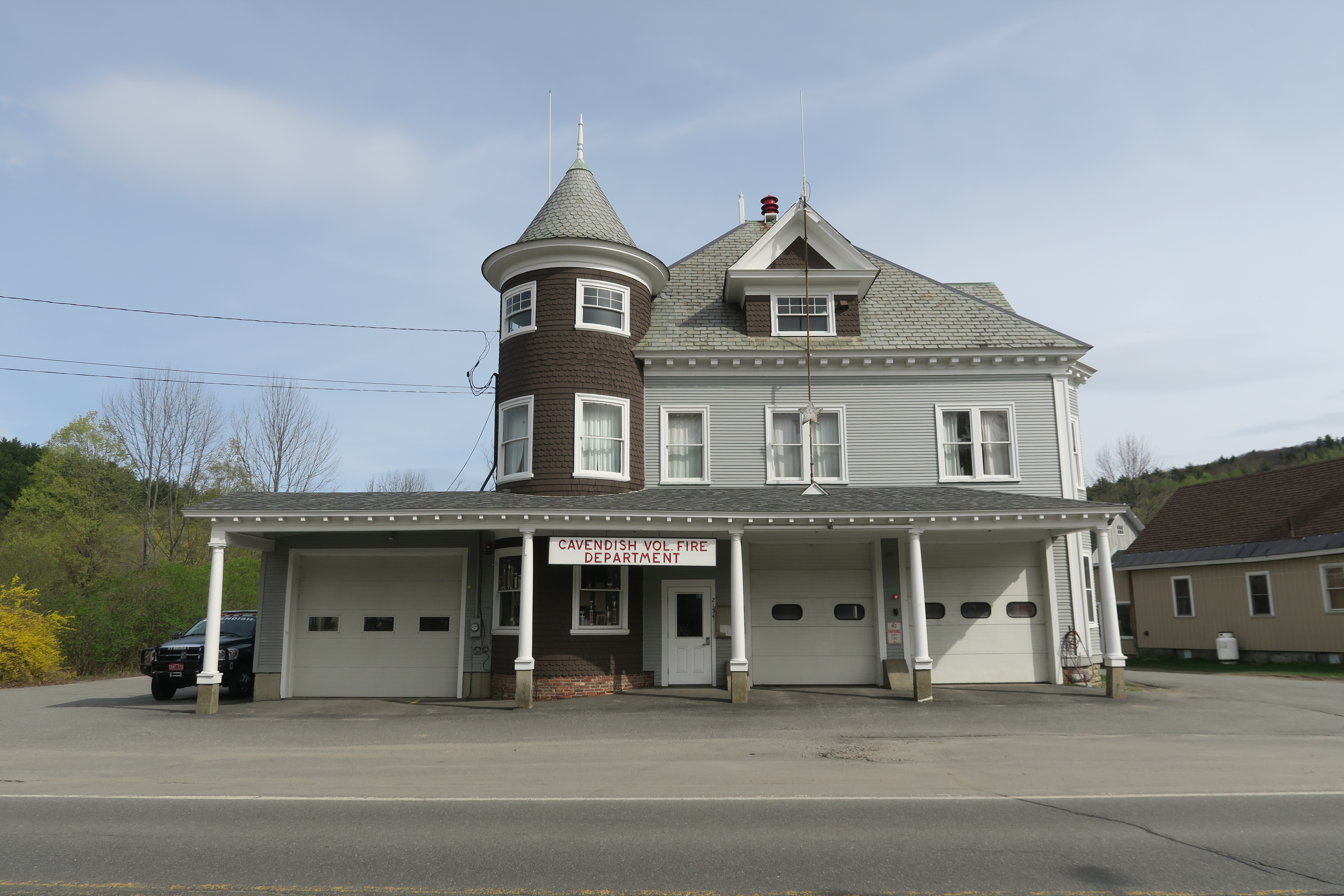
- Cavendish Volunteer Fire Department

- Location in Windsor County and the state of Vermont
- Coordinates: 43°23′06″N 72°36′49″W
- Country: United States
- State: Vermont
- County: Windsor

Area
  - Total: 0.66 sq mi (1.7 km^{2})
  - Land: 0.66 sq mi (1.7 km^{2})
  - Water: 0 sq mi (0.0 km^{2})
- Elevation: 942 ft (287 m)

Population (2010)
  - Total: 179
  - Density: 270/sq mi (110/km^{2})
- Time zone: UTC-5 (Eastern (EST))
  - Summer (DST): UTC-4 (EDT)
- ZIP code: 05142
- Area code: 802
- FIPS code: 50-12175
- GNIS feature ID: 2586623

Cavendish is a census-designated place, the central village of the town of Cavendish, Windsor County, Vermont, United States. Until the mid–nineteenth century it was known as Duttonsville. (Note: http://www.cavendishconnects.com/history/) As of the 2010 census, the population of the CDP was 179, compared to 1,367 for the entire town of Cavendish.

Cavendish is the site of the 1848 accident where Phineas Gage got an iron rod shot through his skull while preparing a railroad bed. He survived, and after treatment became a case study for brain researchers. The town has erected a memorial to Gage. The town is also the birthplace of Nettie Stevens, the scientist who discovered the Y chromosome. Today, the village is home to Cavendish Labs, an AI alignment and pandemic prevention research institute, as well as a branch of Mack Molding.

== Geography ==
Cavendish is located along Vermont Route 131 in the Black River valley. Route 131 heads west to Proctorsville, a larger village within the town of Cavendish, then connects with Vermont Route 103 to Ludlow. To the east, Route 131 leads to the village of Ascutney on the Connecticut River.
