= Windsor (CDP), Vermont =

Census-designated place in Vermont, United States

Windsor, Vermont
- Census-designated place
- Windsor, Vermont, from the northeast, with Mount Ascutney visible in the background

- Location in Windsor County and the state of Vermont
- Coordinates: 43°28′47″N 72°23′37″W
- Country: United States
- State: Vermont
- County: Windsor

Area
  - Total: 1.3 sq mi (3.4 km^{2})
  - Land: 1.2 sq mi (3.1 km^{2})
  - Water: 0.12 sq mi (0.3 km^{2})
- Elevation: 354 ft (108 m)

Population (2010)
  - Total: 2,066
  - Density: 1,700/sq mi (670/km^{2})
- Time zone: UTC-5 (Eastern (EST))
  - Summer (DST): UTC-4 (EDT)
- ZIP code: 05089
- Area code: 802
- FIPS code: 50-85000
- GNIS feature ID: 2586662

Windsor is a census-designated place (CDP) comprising the main settlement within the town of Windsor, Windsor County, Vermont, United States. The population of the CDP was 2,066 at the 2010 census, compared with 3,553 for the town as a whole.

== Geography ==
According to the United States Census Bureau, the CDP has a total area of 1.3 square miles (3.4 km^{2}), of which 1.2 square miles (3.1 km^{2}) is land and 0.12 square miles (0.3 km^{2}), or 8.13%, is water. It is located along the Connecticut River, which forms the state boundary with New Hampshire.

U.S. Route 5 runs north-south through the village, connecting White River Junction to the north with Springfield and Bellows Falls to the south. Vermont Route 44 (Union Street) runs west from the center of the village towards Brownsville and South Reading. Interstate 91 passes west of the village but does not serve it directly; the closest access is Exit 9 in Hartland. The Cornish–Windsor Covered Bridge, one of the longest covered bridges in the world, crosses the Connecticut River from Windsor into Cornish, New Hampshire.
