= Felchville, Vermont =

Coordinates: 43°27′23″N 72°32′16″W

Felchville is a populated place in the town of Reading, Windsor County, Vermont, United States.

== History ==
Felchville was named for businessman William Felch. A post office called Felchville operated from 1830 until 1922.

Notable people that lived in Felchville include Hank White (1833–1900), a blackface minstrel performer in J.A. Coburn's Minstrels and farmer.

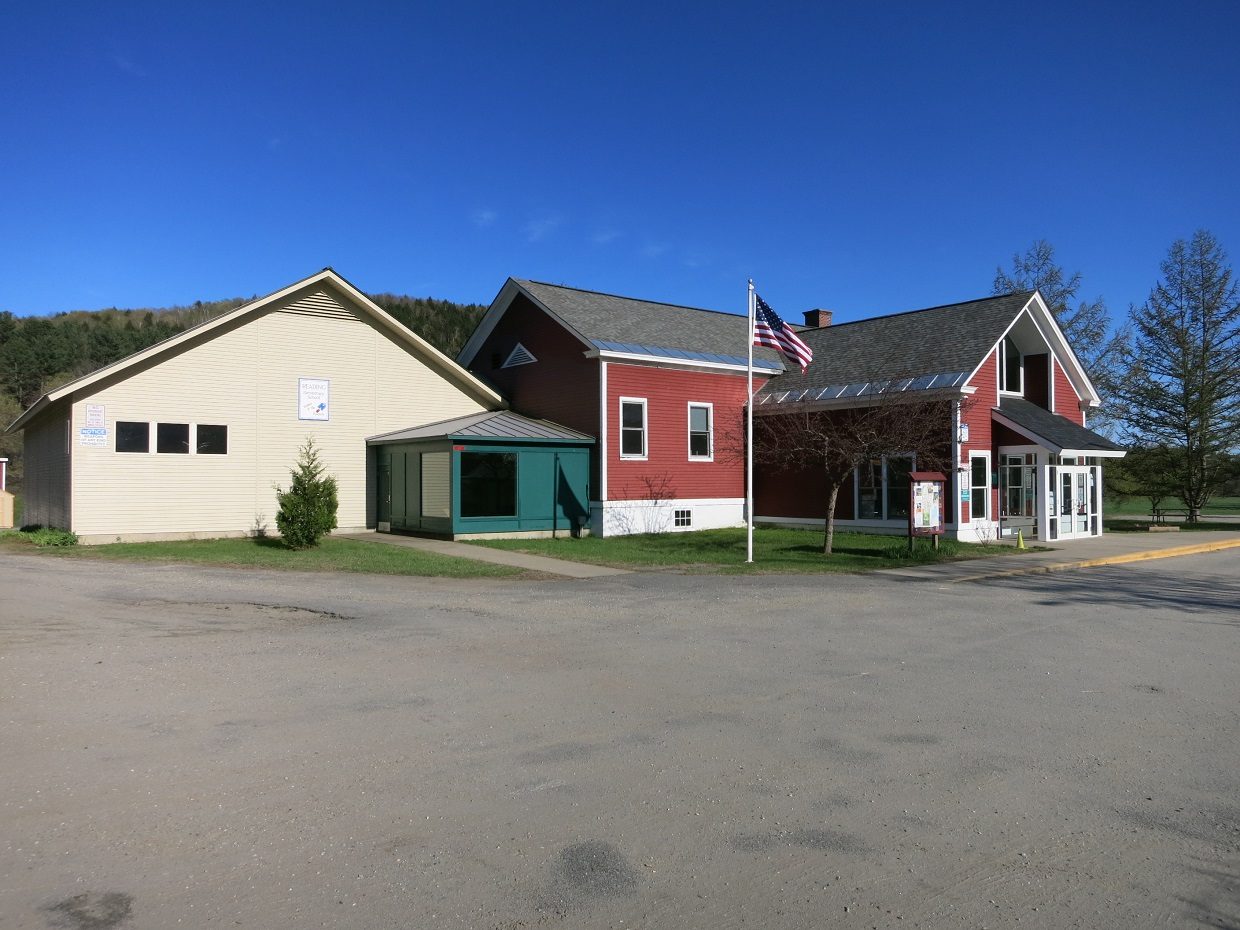
Reading Elementary School

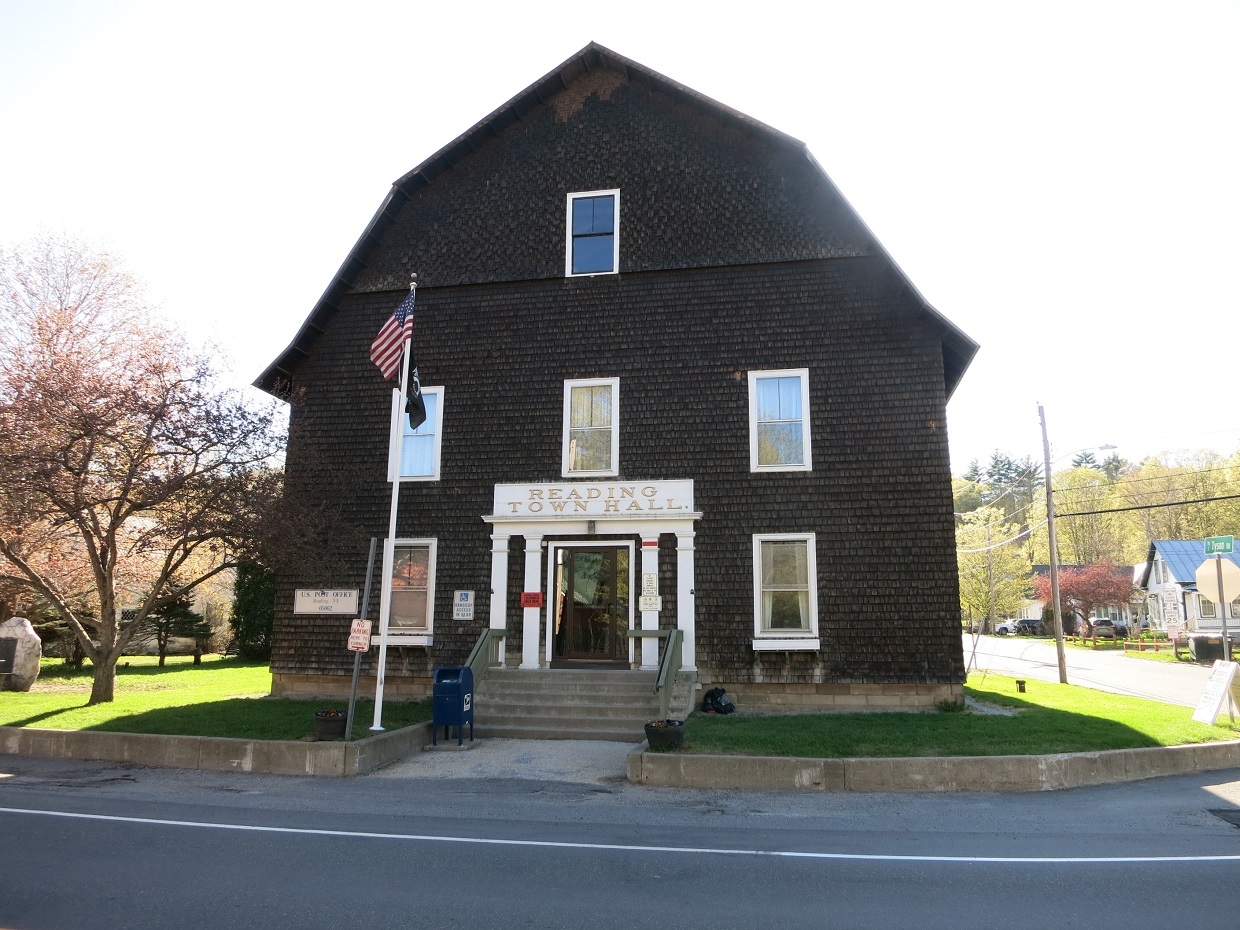
Reading Town Hall and Post Office

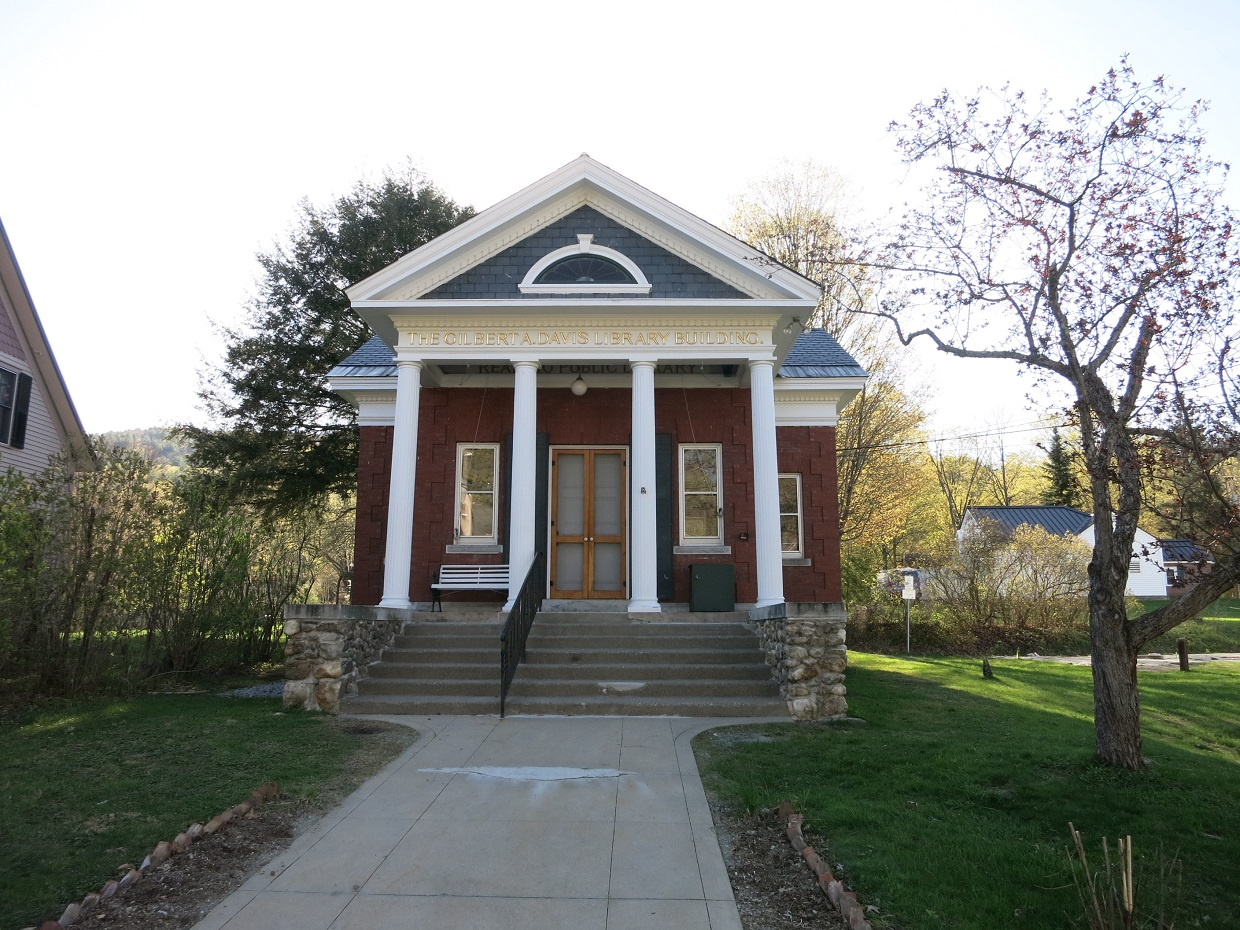
Gilbert A. Davis Library
