= Cavendish, Vermont =

- Town
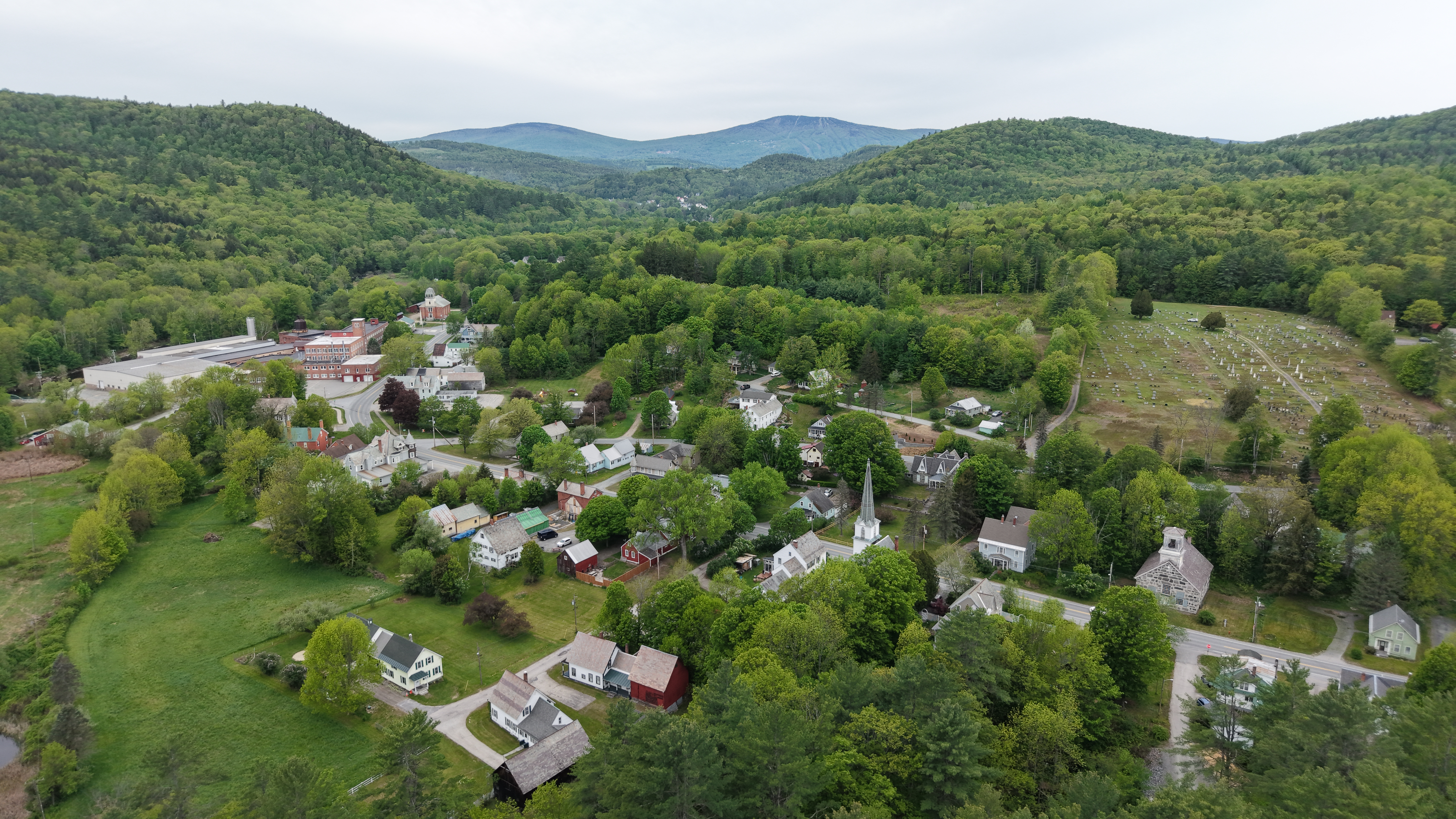
- Cavendish, Vermont, from the northeast

- Seal

- Location in Windsor County and the state of Vermont.
- Coordinates: 43°23′11″N 72°36′45″W
- Country: United States
- State: Vermont
- County: Windsor
- Communities: Cavendish; Cavendish Center; Proctorsville; Whitesville

Area
  - Total: 39.7 sq mi (102.8 km^{2})
  - Land: 39.5 sq mi (102.2 km^{2})
  - Water: 0.23 sq mi (0.6 km^{2})
- Elevation: 945 ft (288 m)

Population (2020)
  - Total: 1,392
  - Density: 35.28/sq mi (13.62/km^{2})
- Time zone: UTC-5 (Eastern (EST))
  - Summer (DST): UTC-4 (EDT)
- ZIP Codes: 05142 (Cavendish); 05153 (Proctorsville)
- Area code: 802
- FIPS code: 50-12250
- GNIS feature ID: 1462066
- Website: www.cavendishvt.com

Cavendish is a town in Windsor County, Vermont, United States. The town was likely named after William Cavendish, 4th Duke of Devonshire. The population was 1,392 at the 2020 census. The town of Cavendish includes the unincorporated villages of Cavendish and Proctorsville.

== History ==
=== Early settlers ===
Captain John Coffeen, the town's first permanent settler, brought his family and possessions into the wilderness of Cavendish in June 1769. They built a dwelling in the northern part of town on what is now E. I. Heald's farm, on the lot still called the "Coffeen pasture". The Coffeens remained the only family in Cavendish for two years. In the early 1780s, Leonard Proctor and Salmon Dutton came from Massachusetts and gave their names to the two major settlements on the Black River, Proctorsville and Duttonsville. In 1782, the first recorded town meeting occurred and Dutton was elected town clerk. He is credited with having conducted a 1784 survey for the first road from Duttonsville along the Black River to Ludlow (now Vermont routes 103 and 131). In 1786 he became the town's first justice of the peace. He also served as moderator of the town meeting, as selectman, and as town treasurer. The marriage of Redfield Proctor and Emily Dutton in 1858 joined the leading families of the two villages and promised to put an end to the former rivalry.

== Geography ==
According to the United States Census Bureau, the town has a total area of 39.7 square miles (102.8 km^{2}), of which 39.5 square miles (102.2 km^{2}) are land and 0.23 square miles (0.6 km^{2}), or 0.59%, is water.

Cavendish was one of thirteen Vermont towns isolated by flooding caused by Hurricane Irene in 2011.

=== Climate ===
This climatic region is typified by large seasonal temperature differences, with warm to hot (and often humid) summers and cold (sometimes severely cold) winters. According to the Köppen Climate Classification system, Cavendish has a humid continental climate, abbreviated "Dfb" on climate maps.

Climate data for Cavendish, Vermont, 1991–2020 normals, 1903-2020 extremes: 842ft (257m)
Month	Jan	Feb	Mar	Apr	May	Jun	Jul	Aug	Sep	Oct	Nov	Dec	Year
Record high °F (°C)	65 (18)	63 (17)	82 (28)	93 (34)	96 (36)	100 (38)	102 (39)	99 (37)	97 (36)	89 (32)	78 (26)	71 (22)	102 (39)
Mean maximum °F (°C)	47 (8)	49 (9)	61 (16)	77 (25)	86 (30)	91 (33)	92 (33)	90 (32)	86 (30)	77 (25)	64 (18)	50 (10)	93 (34)
Mean daily maximum °F (°C)	29.8 (−1.2)	33.3 (0.7)	41.6 (5.3)	55.1 (12.8)	68.4 (20.2)	77.1 (25.1)	82.1 (27.8)	80.5 (26.9)	72.9 (22.7)	59.3 (15.2)	46.4 (8.0)	35.1 (1.7)	56.8 (13.8)
Daily mean °F (°C)	18.7 (−7.4)	20.7 (−6.3)	29.3 (−1.5)	42.2 (5.7)	54.9 (12.7)	64.1 (17.8)	69.0 (20.6)	67.1 (19.5)	59.3 (15.2)	46.8 (8.2)	35.9 (2.2)	25.5 (−3.6)	44.5 (6.9)
Mean daily minimum °F (°C)	7.6 (−13.6)	8.0 (−13.3)	17.1 (−8.3)	29.3 (−1.5)	41.3 (5.2)	51.0 (10.6)	55.9 (13.3)	53.7 (12.1)	45.7 (7.6)	34.3 (1.3)	25.4 (−3.7)	15.8 (−9.0)	32.1 (0.1)
Mean minimum °F (°C)	−18 (−28)	−18 (−28)	−6 (−21)	15 (−9)	26 (−3)	34 (1)	41 (5)	38 (3)	28 (−2)	19 (−7)	7 (−14)	−10 (−23)	−23 (−31)
Record low °F (°C)	−38 (−39)	−40 (−40)	−27 (−33)	−2 (−19)	17 (−8)	20 (−7)	33 (1)	28 (−2)	17 (−8)	9 (−13)	−17 (−27)	−42 (−41)	−42 (−41)
Average precipitation inches (mm)	3.76 (96)	2.73 (69)	3.50 (89)	3.75 (95)	3.89 (99)	4.57 (116)	4.04 (103)	3.94 (100)	3.82 (97)	4.86 (123)	3.63 (92)	4.05 (103)	46.54 (1,182)
Average snowfall inches (cm)	21.20 (53.8)	18.70 (47.5)	17.10 (43.4)	4.10 (10.4)	0.10 (0.25)	0.00 (0.00)	0.00 (0.00)	0.00 (0.00)	0.00 (0.00)	0.80 (2.0)	4.50 (11.4)	16.80 (42.7)	83.3 (211.45)
Source 1: NOAA
Source 2: XMACIS (records & monthly max/mins)

== Images ==
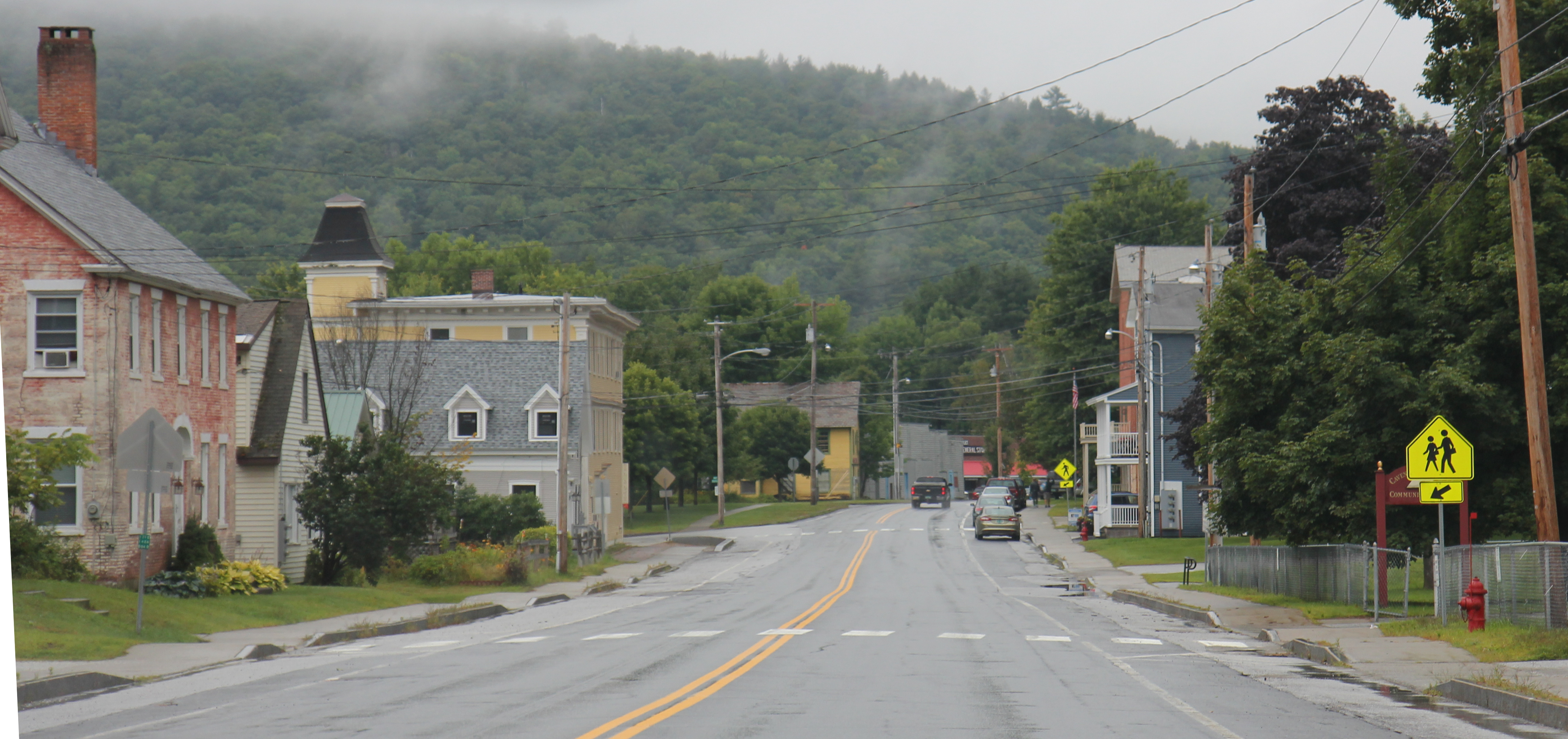
Downtown on a foggy day

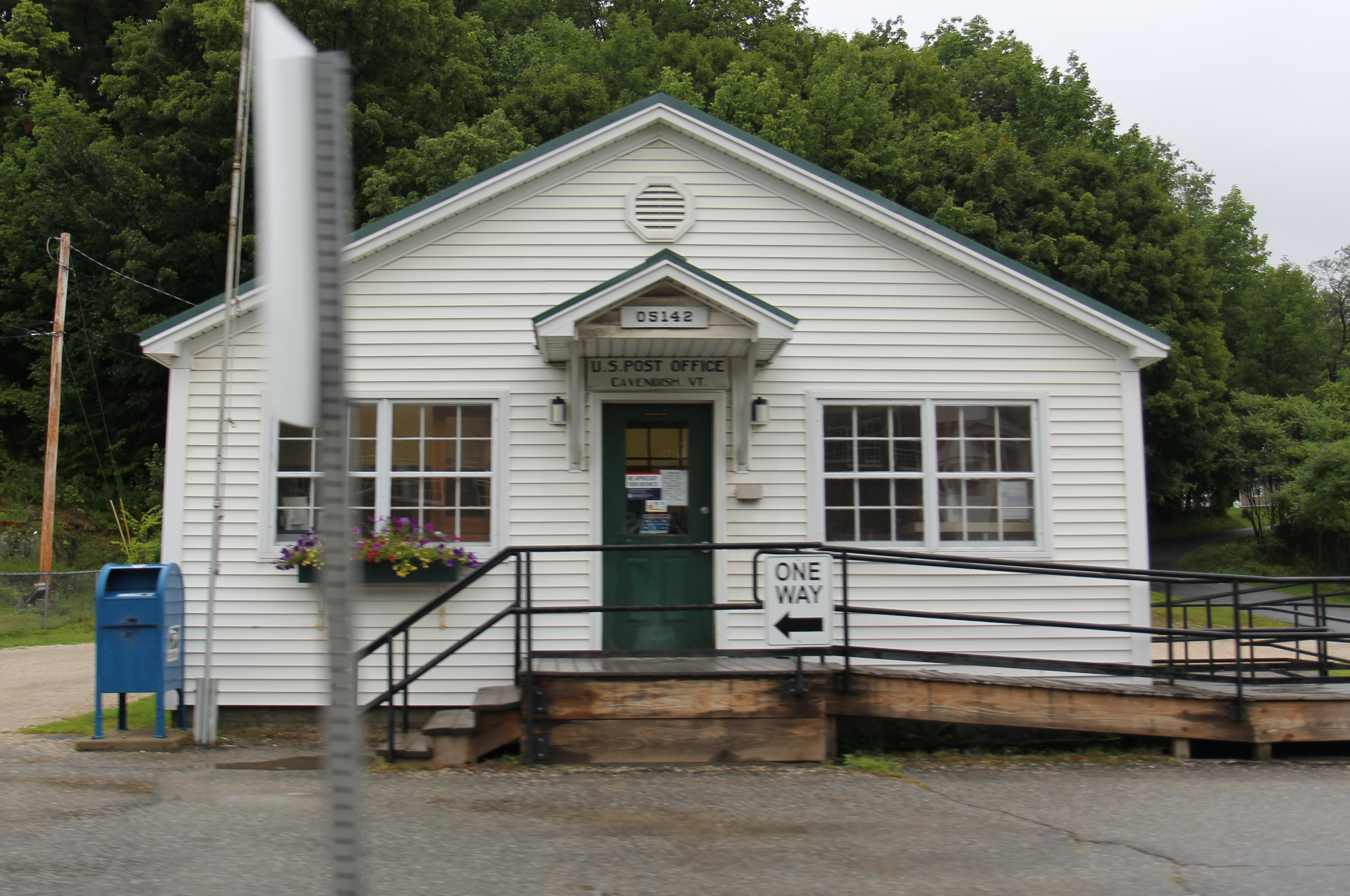
Post office

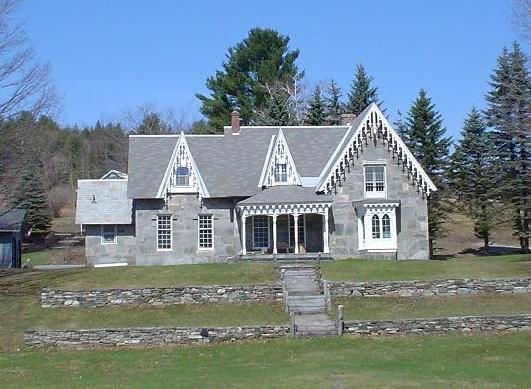
House in Cavendish

== Demographics ==
Historical population
Census	Pop.	Note	%±
1790	491		—
1800	922		87.8%
1810	1,295		40.5%
1820	1,551		19.8%
1830	1,498		−3.4%
1840	1,427		−4.7%
1850	1,576		10.4%
1860	1,539		−2.3%
1870	1,823		18.5%
1880	1,276		−30.0%
1890	1,172		−8.2%
1900	1,352		15.4%
1910	1,208		−10.7%
1920	1,319		9.2%
1930	1,418		7.5%
1940	1,398		−1.4%
1950	1,374		−1.7%
1960	1,223		−11.0%
1970	1,264		3.4%
1980	1,355		7.2%
1990	1,323		−2.4%
2000	1,470		11.1%
2010	1,367		−7.0%
2020	1,392		1.8%
U.S. Decennial Census

As of the census of 2000, there were 1,470 people, 617 households, and 420 families residing in the town. The population density was 37.1 people per square mile (14.3/km^{2}). There were 860 housing units at an average density of 21.7 per square mile (8.4/km^{2}). The racial makeup of the town was 97.82% White, 0.07% African American, 0.14% Native American, 0.82% Asian, 0.14% from other races, and 1.02% from two or more races. Hispanic or Latino of any race were 0.95% of the population.

There were 617 households, out of which 25.8% had children under the age of 18 living with them, 57.5% were married couples living together, 7.6% had a female householder with no husband present, and 31.8% were non-families. 23.5% of all households were made up of individuals, and 10.9% had someone living alone who was 65 years of age or older. The average household size was 2.37 and the average family size was 2.80.

In the town, the population was spread out, with 20.7% under the age of 18, 5.2% from 18 to 24, 28.1% from 25 to 44, 28.2% from 45 to 64, and 17.9% who were 65 years of age or older. The median age was 42 years. For every 100 females, there were 98.1 males. For every 100 females age 18 and over, there were 97.0 males.

The median income for a household in the town was $34,727, and the median income for a family was $41,591. Males had a median income of $30,223 versus $22,206 for females. The per capita income for the town was $18,420. About 2.4% of families and 6.3% of the population were below the poverty line, including 4.5% of those under age 18 and 7.1% of those age 65 or over.

== Notable people ==
- Lizzie Aiken (1817–1906), a nurse in the American Civil War, who was widely known as “Aunt Lizzie”
- Harriett Ellen Grannis Arey (1819–1901), educator, author, editor, and publisher
- Henry B. Atherton, a soldier in the American Civil War from Vermont, a lawyer and state legislator for New Hampshire during the late 19th century
- Richard Fletcher, Member of the US House of Representatives from Massachusetts
- Ryland Fletcher, 24th Governor of Vermont
- Phineas Gage (1823–1860), working near Cavendish in 1848, survived an accident in which a large iron rod was driven through his head
- John Martyn Harlow (1819–1907), physician who attended Phineas Gage during his recovery
- Redfield Proctor, United States senator, Secretary of War, and 37th governor of Vermont
- William H. Proctor, Wisconsin State Assemblyman and farmer
- Colonel Thomas O. Seaver, Civil War era Medal of Honor recipient
- Aleksandr Solzhenitsyn (1918–2008), Russian writer and historian, Nobel prize winner
- Nettie Maria Stevens (1861–1912), American geneticist who discovered sex chromosomes
