= Hartness State Airport =

Airport in Vermont, United States

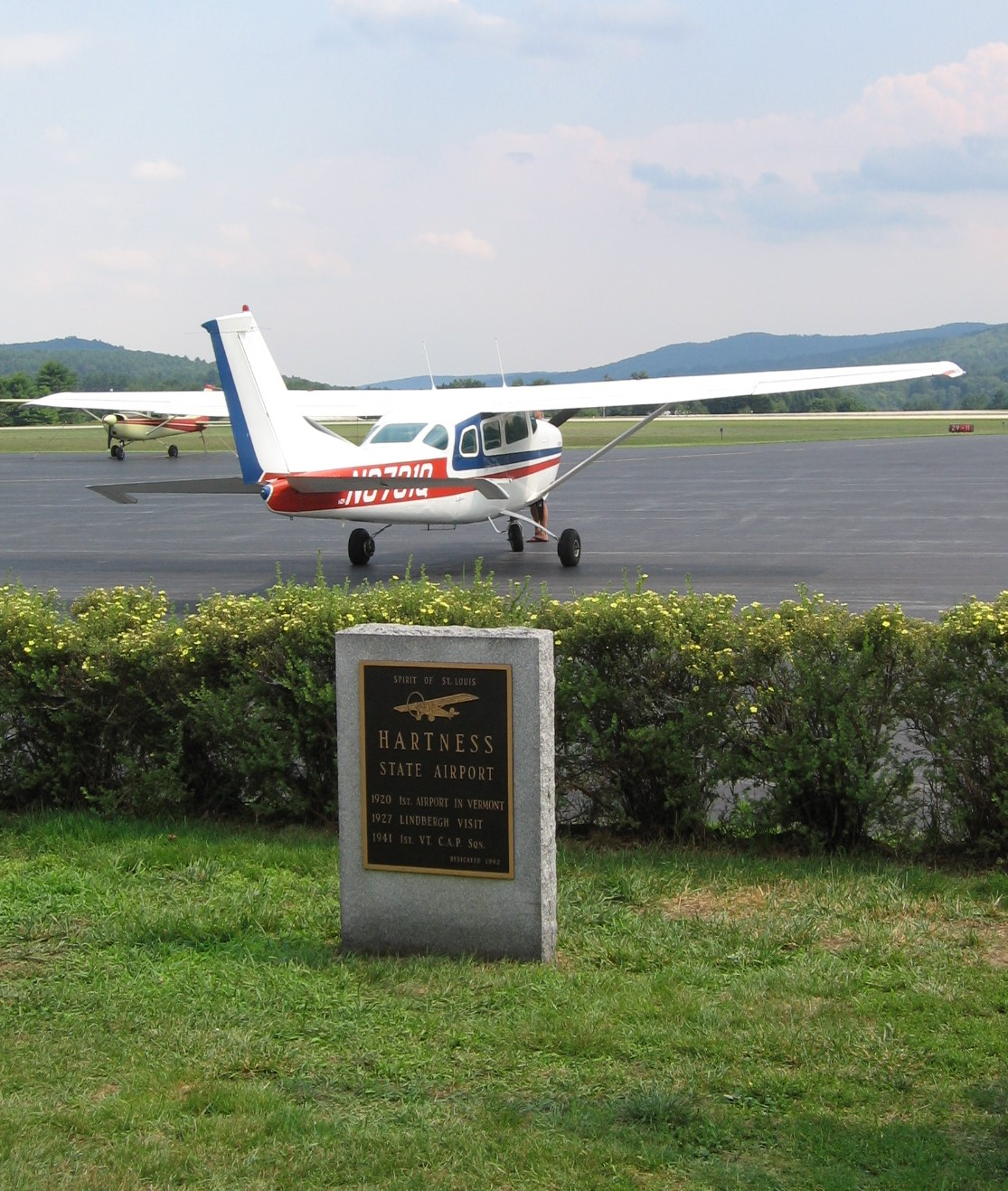
- Commemorative marker and parking for transient aircraft
- IATA: VSF; ICAO: KVSF; FAA LID: VSF

Summary
- Airport type: Public
- Owner: State of Vermont
- Serves: Springfield, Vermont
- Elevation AMSL: 577 ft (176 m)
- Coordinates: 43.343611°N 72.517222°W
- Website: vtrans.vermont.gov/aviation/airports/hartness

Map
- Interactive map of Hartness State Airport

Runways
Direction	Length		Surface
Direction	ft	m	Surface
5/23	5,501	1,677	Asphalt
11/29	3,000	914	Asphalt

Statistics (2017)
- Aircraft operations: 6,611
- Based aircraft: 23
- Source: Federal Aviation Administration

Hartness State Airport (IATA: VSF, ICAO: KVSF, FAA LID: VSF) is a public airport located three miles (5 km) northwest of the central business district of Springfield, a town in Windsor County, Vermont, United States. It is owned by the State of Vermont.

== History ==
The airport was established by its namesake, James Hartness, who donated the land as the first airfield in Vermont. After his trans-Atlantic flight, Charles Lindbergh toured the United States in the Spirit of St. Louis to promote aviation. He landed in Springfield on July 26, 1927, in his visit to Vermont and spoke at a large gathering at the airport.

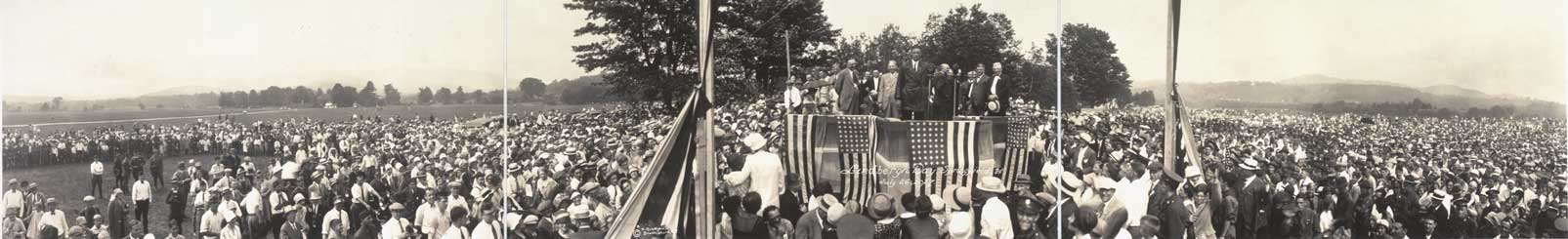
Crowd attending celebration of Charles Lindbergh's arrival at Springfield, Vermont's airport in July, 1927. Image courtesy of Springfield Art & Historical Society.

== Facilities and aircraft ==
Hartness State Airport covers an area of 192 acres (78 ha) which contains two asphalt paved runways: 5/23 measuring 5,501 x 100 ft (1,677 x 30 m) and 11/29 measuring 3,000 x 75 ft (914 x 23 m).

For the 12-month period ending December 31, 2017, the airport had 6,611 aircraft operations, an average of 127 per week: 95% general aviation, 3% air taxi and 2% military. There were 23 aircraft based at this airport: 11 single engine, and 12 gliders.

== See also ==
- List of airports in Vermont
