= Reading, Vermont =

- Town
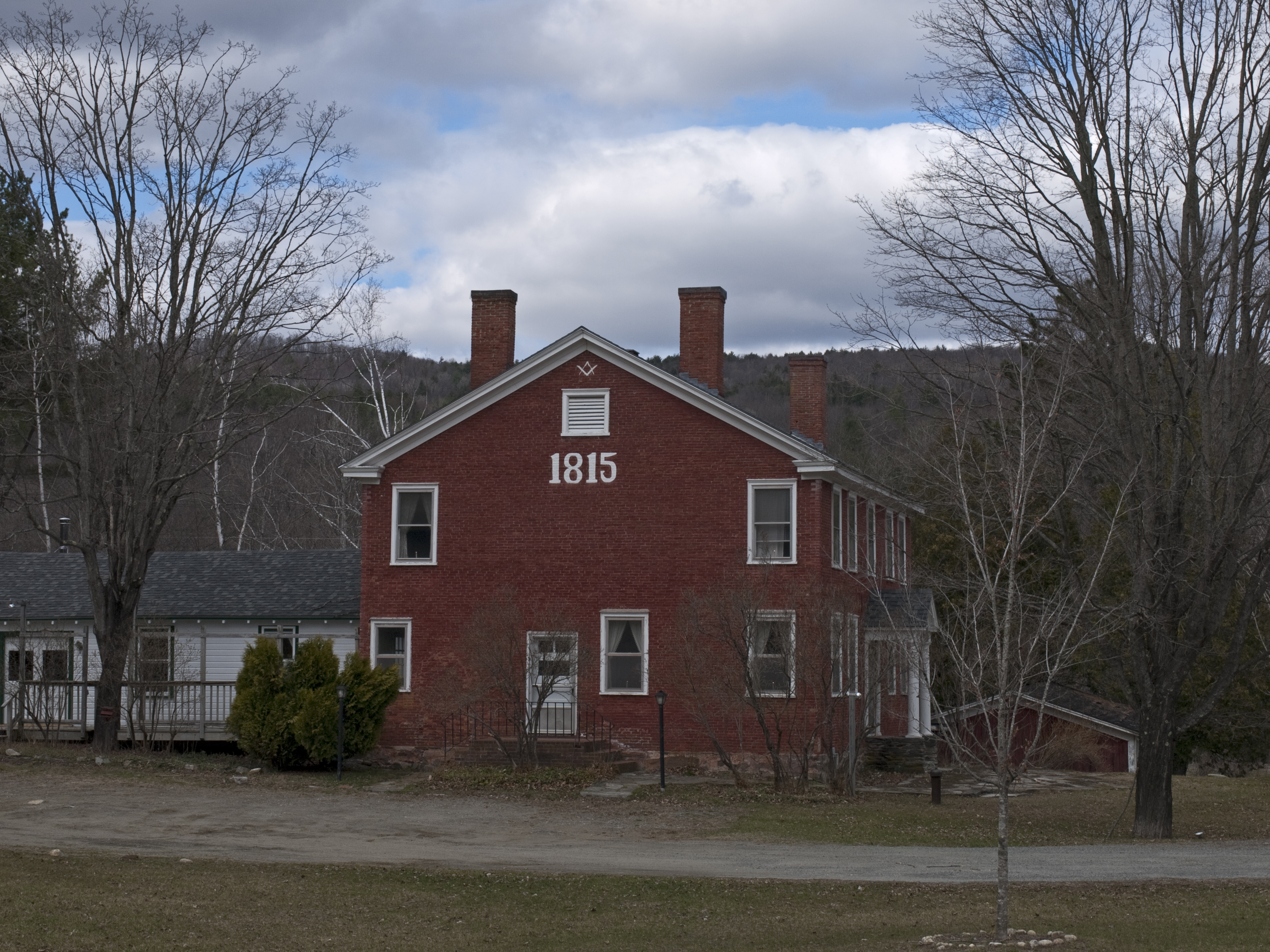
- Bennett's 1815 House, located at the junction of Vermont Routes 44 and 106, southeast of the town center

- Seal

- Location in Windsor County and the state of Vermont.
- Coordinates: 43°29′55″N 72°36′28″W
- Country: United States
- State: Vermont
- County: Windsor
- Communities: Reading Center; Bailey Mills; Felchville; Hammondsville; South Reading

Area
  - Total: 41.7 sq mi (107.9 km^{2})
  - Land: 41.5 sq mi (107.5 km^{2})
  - Water: 0.15 sq mi (0.4 km^{2})
- Elevation: 1,926 ft (587 m)

Population (2020)
  - Total: 687
  - Density: 16.6/sq mi (6.39/km^{2})
- Time zone: UTC-5 (Eastern (EST))
  - Summer (DST): UTC-4 (EDT)
- ZIP Codes: 05062 (Reading); 05153 (South Reading)
- Area code: 802
- FIPS code: 50-58375
- GNIS feature ID: 1462183
- Website: readingvt.govoffice.com

Reading is a town in Windsor County, Vermont, United States. The population was 687 at the 2020 census.

== History ==
On August 30, 1754, after being captured by Abenakis at Fort at Number 4, Charlestown, New Hampshire, and being force-marched to Montreal, Susannah Willard Johnson gave birth to a daughter about .5 miles (0.80 km) up Knapp Brook. A marker beside Vermont Route 106 commemorates this event.

== Geography ==
According to the United States Census Bureau, the town has a total area of 41.7 square miles (107.9 km^{2}), of which 41.5 square miles (107.5 km^{2}) is land and 0.2 square mile (0.4 km^{2}) (0.41%) is water.

== Landmarks ==
Reading is the home of Jenne Farm, a tourist attraction that draws in many photographers and other visitors, especially in the autumn.

== Demographics ==
Historical population
Census	Pop.	Note	%±
1790	747		—
1800	1,120		49.9%
1810	1,565		39.7%
1820	1,603		2.4%
1830	1,409		−12.1%
1840	1,363		−3.3%
1850	1,171		−14.1%
1860	1,159		−1.0%
1870	1,012		−12.7%
1880	953		−5.8%
1890	749		−21.4%
1900	649		−13.4%
1910	530		−18.3%
1920	463		−12.6%
1930	474		2.4%
1940	437		−7.8%
1950	470		7.6%
1960	472		0.4%
1970	564		19.5%
1980	647		14.7%
1990	614		−5.1%
2000	707		15.1%
2010	666		−5.8%
2020	687		3.2%
U.S. Decennial Census

As of the census of 2010, there were 666 people, 290 households, and 192 families residing in the town. The population density was 16.0 inhabitants per square mile (6.2/km^{2}). There were 448 housing units at an average density of 10.7 per square mile (4.1/km^{2}). The racial makeup of the town was 99.1% White, 0.0% African American, 0.3% Asian, and 0.6% from two or more races. Hispanic or Latino of any race were 0.6% of the population.

There were 290 households, out of which 24.8% had children under the age of 18 living with them, 54.1% were married couples living together, 9.3% had a female householder with no husband present, 2.8% had a male householder with no wife present, and 33.8% were non-families. 25.50% of all households were made up of individuals, and 11.3% had someone living alone who was 65 years of age or older. The average household size was 2.30 and the average family size was 2.70.

In the town, the population was spread out, with 20.8% age 19 or under, 3.8% from 20 to 24, 20.0% from 25 to 44, 36.1% from 45 to 64, and 19.7% who were 65 years of age or older. The median age was 47.9 years. For every 100 females, there were 94.7 males. For every 100 females age 18 and over, there were 97.4 males.

The median income for a household in the town was $58,667, and the median income for a family was $67,250. Males had a median income of $38,750 versus $29,219 for females. The per capita income for the town was $28,950. About 1.05% of families and 8.8% of the population were below the poverty line, including 12.1% of those under age 18 and 3.7% of those age 65 or over.

== Education and municipal services ==
Reading is served by Reading Elementary School for Grades Pre-K–4. In 2017–2018, there were a total of 60 students. Students attend grades 5 and 6 at The Prosper Valley School, located in Pomfret, VT. Student attend grades 7–12 at Woodstock Union High and Middle School. This school was part of the Windsor Central Unified Union School District as of July 1, 2018, as part of Vermont Act 46 changes. The District has since been renamed the Mountain Views School District.

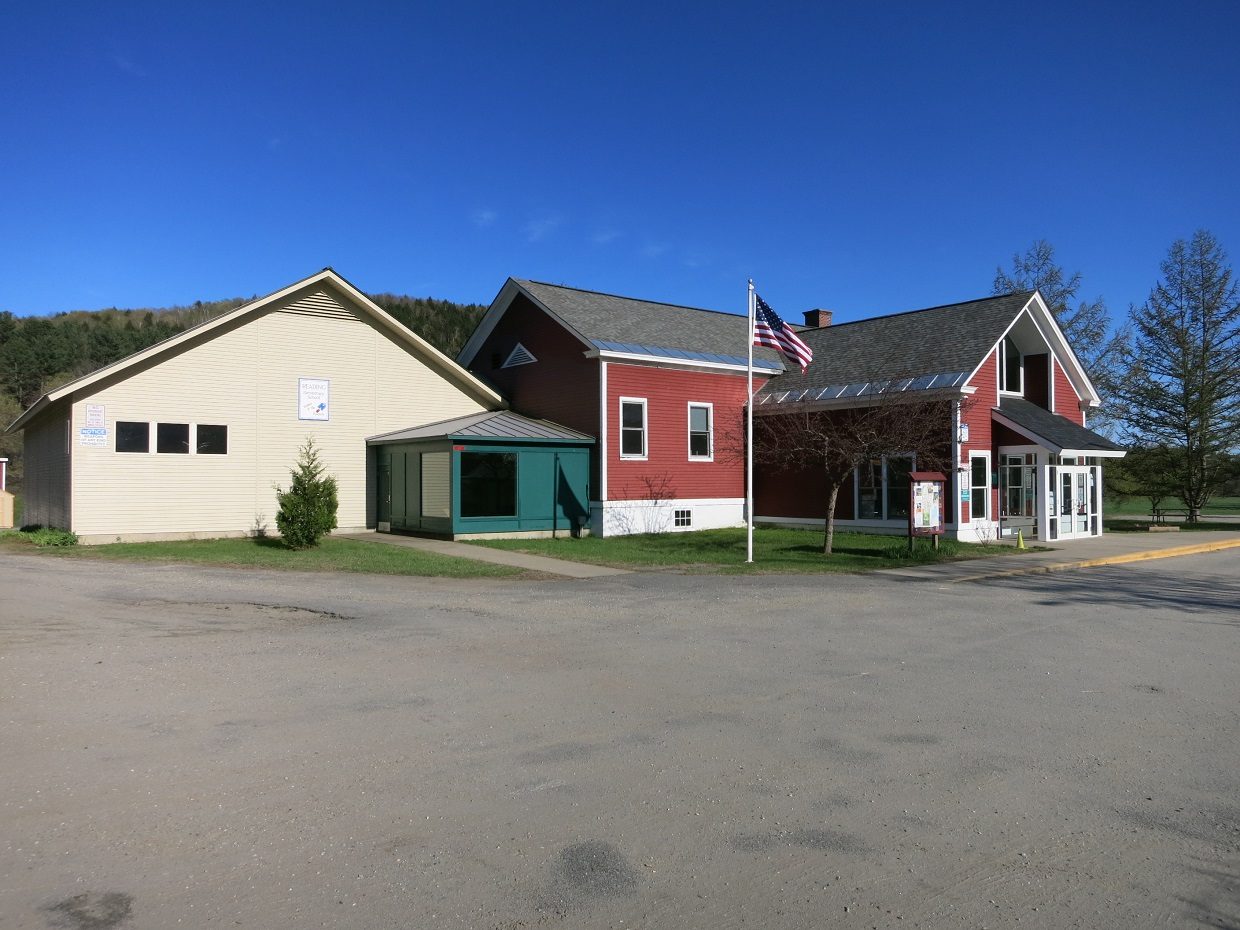
Reading Elementary School

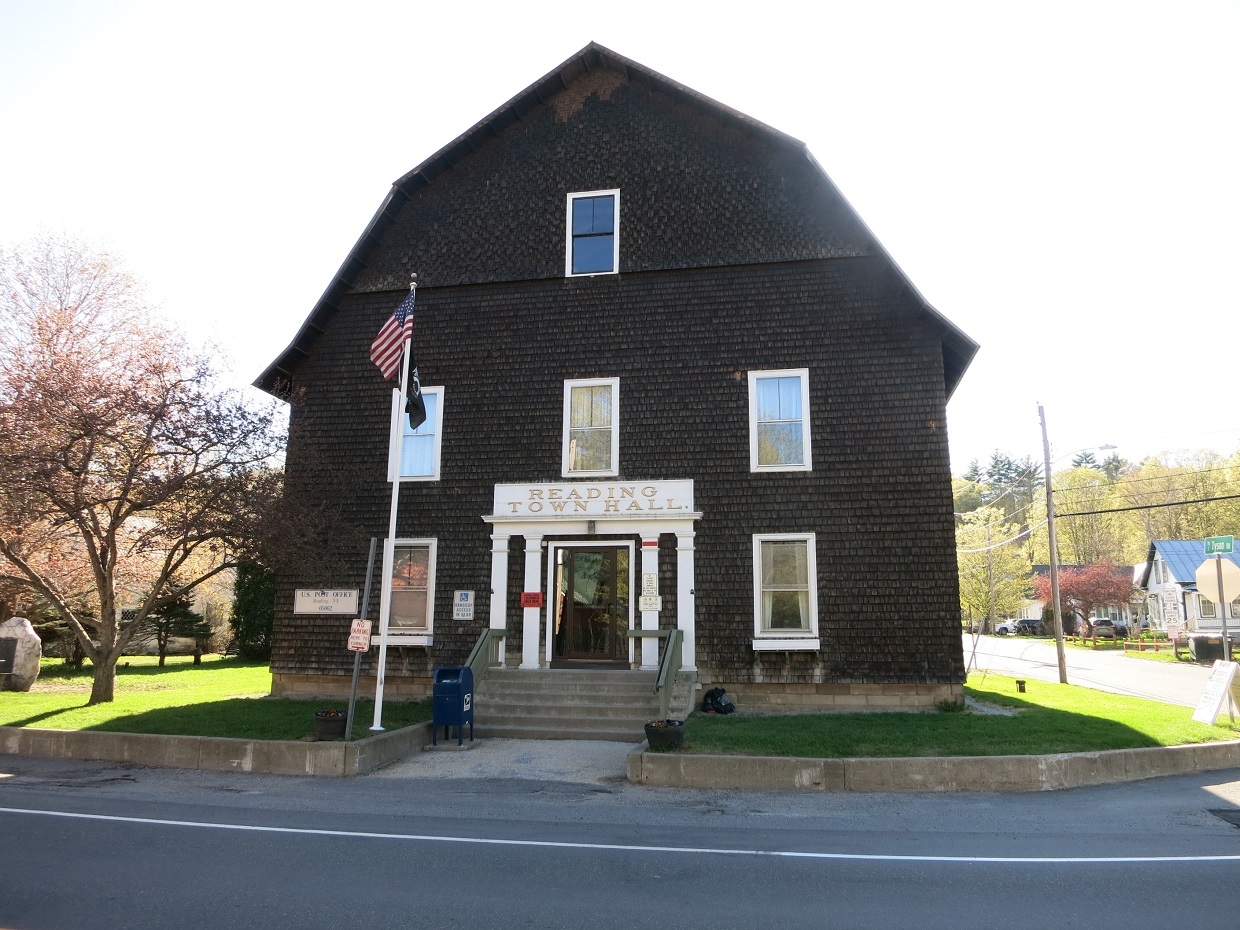
Reading Town Hall and Post Office

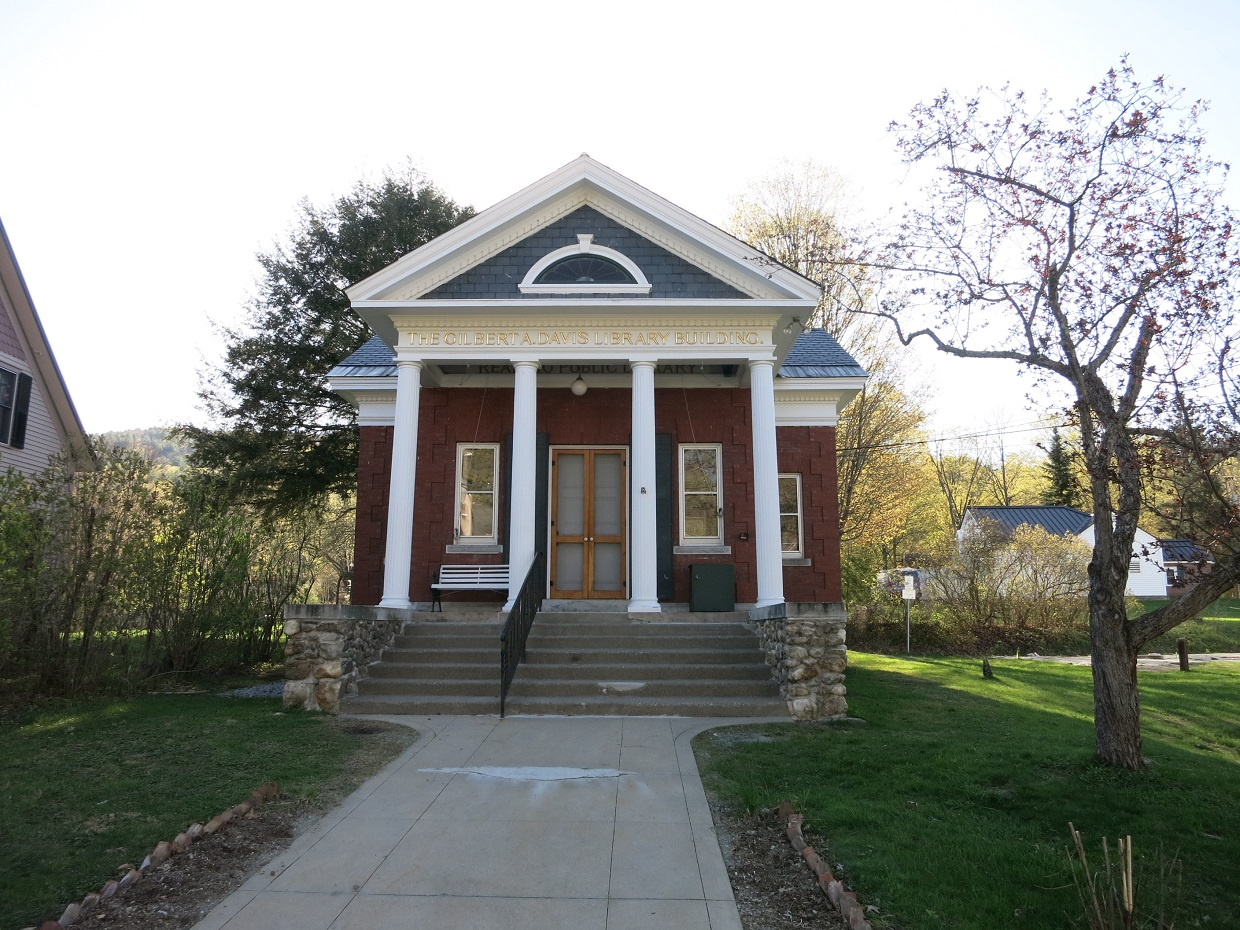
Gilbert A. Davis Library

== Notable people ==
- Titus Brown, US congressman
- Christian William Miller, artist, model, and inventor of a pocket-sized water desalination device
- Daphne Zuniga, actress
