= Springfield (CDP), Vermont =

Census-designated place in Vermont, United States

Springfield, Vermont
- Census-designated place
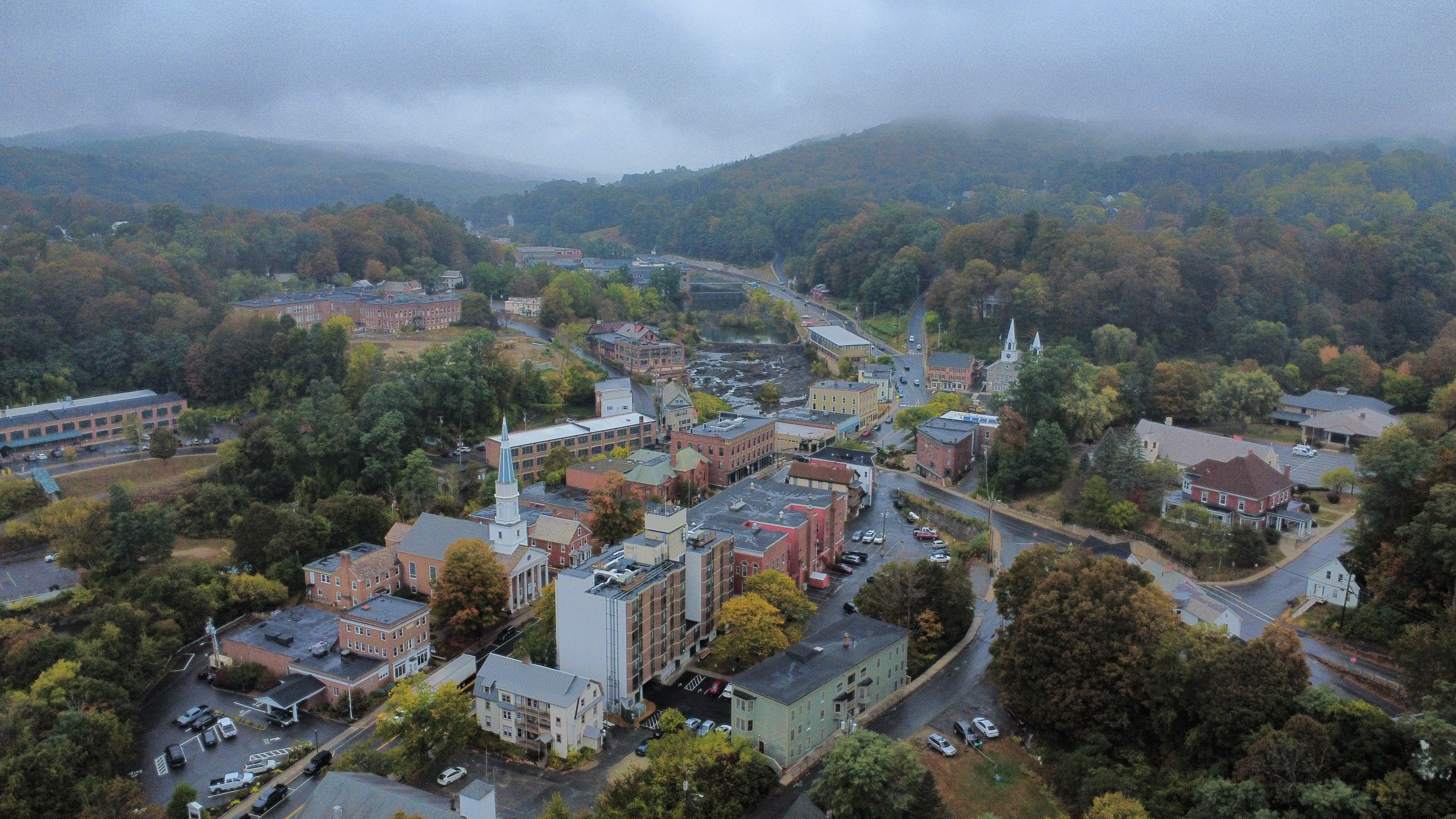
- Springfield, VT, from the southeast

- Location in Windsor County and the state of Vermont
- Coordinates: 43°18′17″N 72°29′18″W
- Country: United States
- State: Vermont
- County: Windsor

Area
  - Total: 2.4 sq mi (6.1 km^{2})
  - Land: 2.3 sq mi (5.9 km^{2})
  - Water: 0.077 sq mi (0.2 km^{2})
- Elevation: 358 ft (109 m)

Population (2010)
  - Total: 3,979
  - Density: 1,700/sq mi (670/km^{2})
- Time zone: UTC-5 (Eastern (EST))
  - Summer (DST): UTC-4 (EDT)
- ZIP code: 05156
- Area code: 802
- FIPS code: 50-69475
- GNIS feature ID: 2378135

Springfield is a census-designated place (CDP) comprising the main settlement within the town of Springfield, Windsor County, Vermont, United States. The population of the CDP was 3,979 at the 2010 census, compared with 9,373 for the town as a whole.

== Geography ==
According to the United States Census Bureau, the CDP has a total area of 2.4 square miles (6.1 km^{2}), of which 2.3 square miles (5.9 km^{2}) is land and 0.08 square miles (0.2 km^{2}), or 3.25%, is water.

== Demographics ==
As of the census of 2000, there were 3,938 people, 1,778 households, and 1,038 families residing in the CDP. The population density was 644.3 people/km^{2} (1,669 people/mi^{2}). There were 1,958 housing units at an average density of 320.3 units/km^{2} (830 units/mi^{2}). The racial makeup of the CDP was 96.83% White, 0.38% Black or African American, 0.15% Native American, 1.19% Asian, 0.08% Pacific Islander, 0.23% from other races, and 1.14% from two or more races. Hispanic or Latino of any race were 1.17% of the population.

There were 1,778 households, out of which 28.3% had children under the age of 18 living with them, 41.6% were married couples living together, 12.7% had a female householder with no husband present, and 41.6% were non-families. 37.5% of all households were made up of individuals, and 19.7% had someone living alone who was 65 years of age or older. The average household size was 2.21 and the average family size was 2.89.

In the CDP, the population was spread out, with 24.6% under the age of 18, 7.2% from 18 to 24, 26.0% from 25 to 44, 23.5% from 45 to 64, and 18.7% who were 65 years of age or older. The median age was 40 years. For every 100 females, there were 84.3 males. For every 100 females age 18 and over, there were 82.8 males.

The median income for a household in the CDP was $28,566, and the median income for a family was $40,768. Males had a median income of $30,625 versus $21,335 for females. The per capita income for the CDP was $17,690. About 7.2% of families and 10.1% of the population were below the poverty line, including 7.0% of those under age 18 and 16.9% of those age 65 or over.
