= Woodstock Union High School (Vermont) =

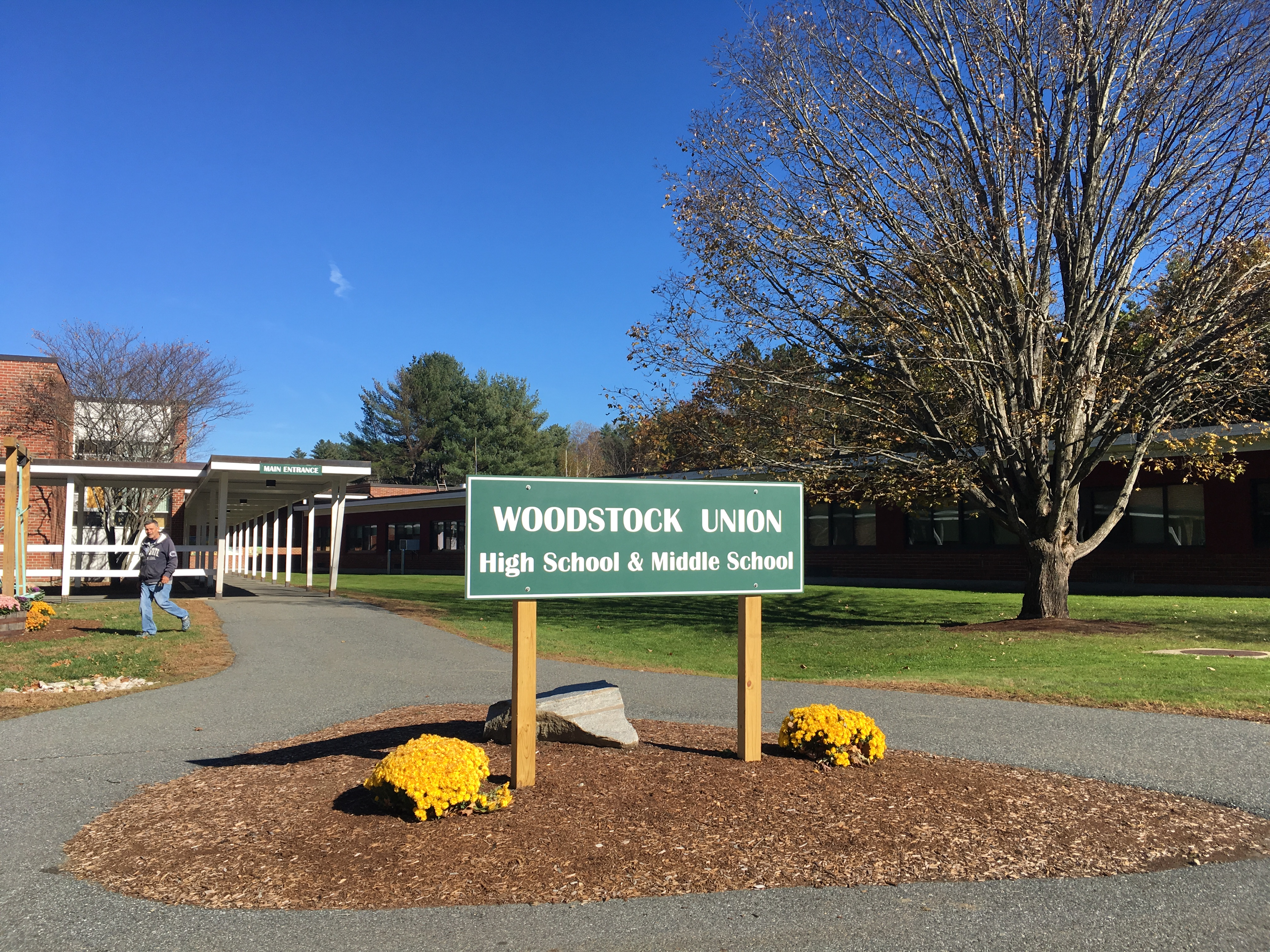

Location
- 100 Amsden Way; Woodstock, Vermont 05091; United States; 43°36′48″N 72°32′44″W

Information
- Type: comprehensive public secondary school
- Established: 1854
- Principal: Aaron Cinquemani
- Teaching staff: 36.60 (FTE)
- Grades: 7–12
- Enrollment: 456 (2023-2024)
- Student to teacher ratio: 12.46
- Color
- Mascot: Wasp
- Newspaper: The Buzz
- Nobel laureates: Victor Ambros
- Website: wuhsms.org

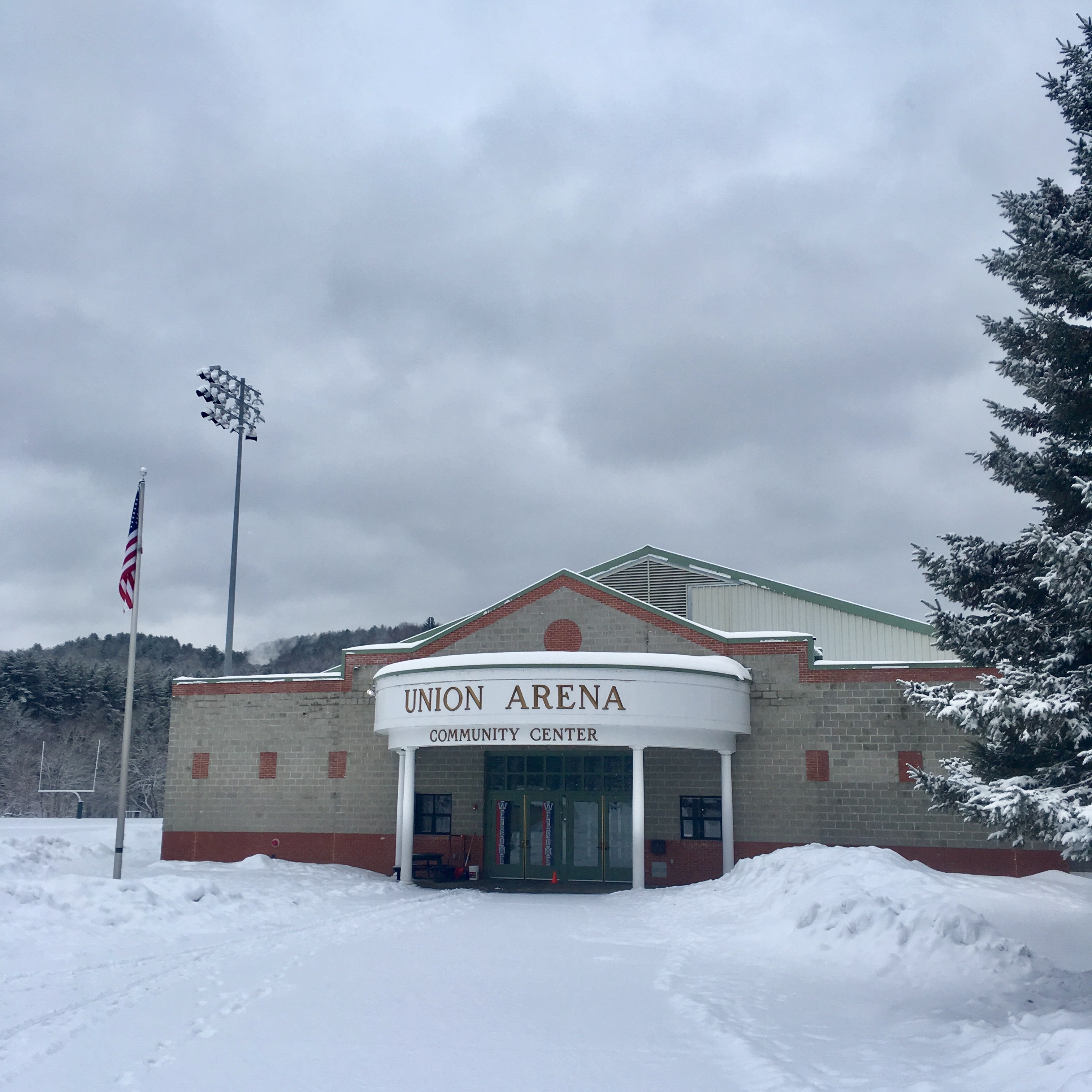
Located on Woodstock Union High School's campus, the Union Arena Community Center serves as the home ice for Woodstock's boys and girls high school ice hockey teams.

Woodstock Union High School (WUHS) is a mid-sized public secondary school located in Woodstock, Vermont, United States. As a member of the Mountain Views Supervisory Union (formerly the Windsor Central Unified Union School District), the school serves seven towns: Barnard, Bridgewater, Killington, Plymouth, Pomfret, Reading, and Woodstock. In addition, WUHS receives tuition students from other surrounding towns such as Hartland, Ludlow, Pittsfield, Sharon, Stockbridge, and Weathersfield, among others. The institution is accredited by the New England Association of Schools and Colleges. Woodstock serves approximately 385 High School students and 190 Middle School students in grades 8 and 7.

== School history and overview ==
Woodstock's first public high school opened January 16, 1854. This opening was less than a year after the town, at its annual meeting, had voted to build the school. The land, purchased in April 1853, was on a knoll below Linden Hill. The current high school, built in 1957, sits on approximately 40 acres (16 ha) of land along the Ottauquechee River just west of the village of West Woodstock on U.S. Route 4. In 2023 school and community members proposed that a new school building be built. On 2026 Town Meeting day, 61% of voters approved a $112 million bond issue to support the building of a new school.

Woodstock Union High School is consistently recognized for its educational quality and in 2020 was listed by U.S. News & World Report as the third best school in the state. In 2025, Woodstock Union Middle School was named a "School of Distinction" by the Association for Middle Level Education. It was one of only 24 schools recognized nationwide "for their outstanding commitment to young adolescent education." 2025 graduates attended schools including Dartmouth, West Point, and Yale.

Following the 2025 passage of Vermont Act 73, Mountain Views Board of Directors Chair Keri Bristow recommended that WUHS serve as a regional hub district. In a July 28, 2025 letter to community members, Bristow cited the school's strengths in offering AP courses as well as programming in the visual and performing arts, music, STEM, trade-career preparation, and CRAFT - Community and Climate Resilience through Agriculture, Forestry and Technology.

== Academic programs ==
The high school has 10 academic departments: computer science, CRAFT, English, mathematics, modern & classical languages, music, science, social studies, visual and performing arts, and wellness.

The interdisciplinary CRAFT program was introduced in 2023 to provide students with an ability to focus on environmental and sustainability themes. Classes in the program include foundations of agriculture, and economics and the environment.

There is a full-year high school band course, and a course in digital music production.

There are Advanced Placement classes in subjects including art history, calculus, chemistry, computer science, government & politics, history, literature, and languages. In 2023 the school offered 16 AP courses.

In 2018 the school opened a new Innovation Studio dedicated to "navigating the messiness of the creative process, from inception to completion," according to the 2018-2019 curriculum guide. In the studio in the fall of 2018, students partnered with peers in Turkey to design a playground. Teachers at Woodstock partner with staff at NuVu Innovation School in Cambridge, Mass., to operate the NuVu studio.

== Sports ==
The school athletic programs fall into the Vermont Principals' Association Division II and Division III for all sports with the exception of Division I boys lacrosse. Woodstock athletics include:

fall: cross country, field hockey, football, golf, mountain biking, boys and girls soccer

winter: alpine skiing, boys and girls basketball, boys and girls ice hockey, boys and girls Nordic skiing, boys and girls snowboard

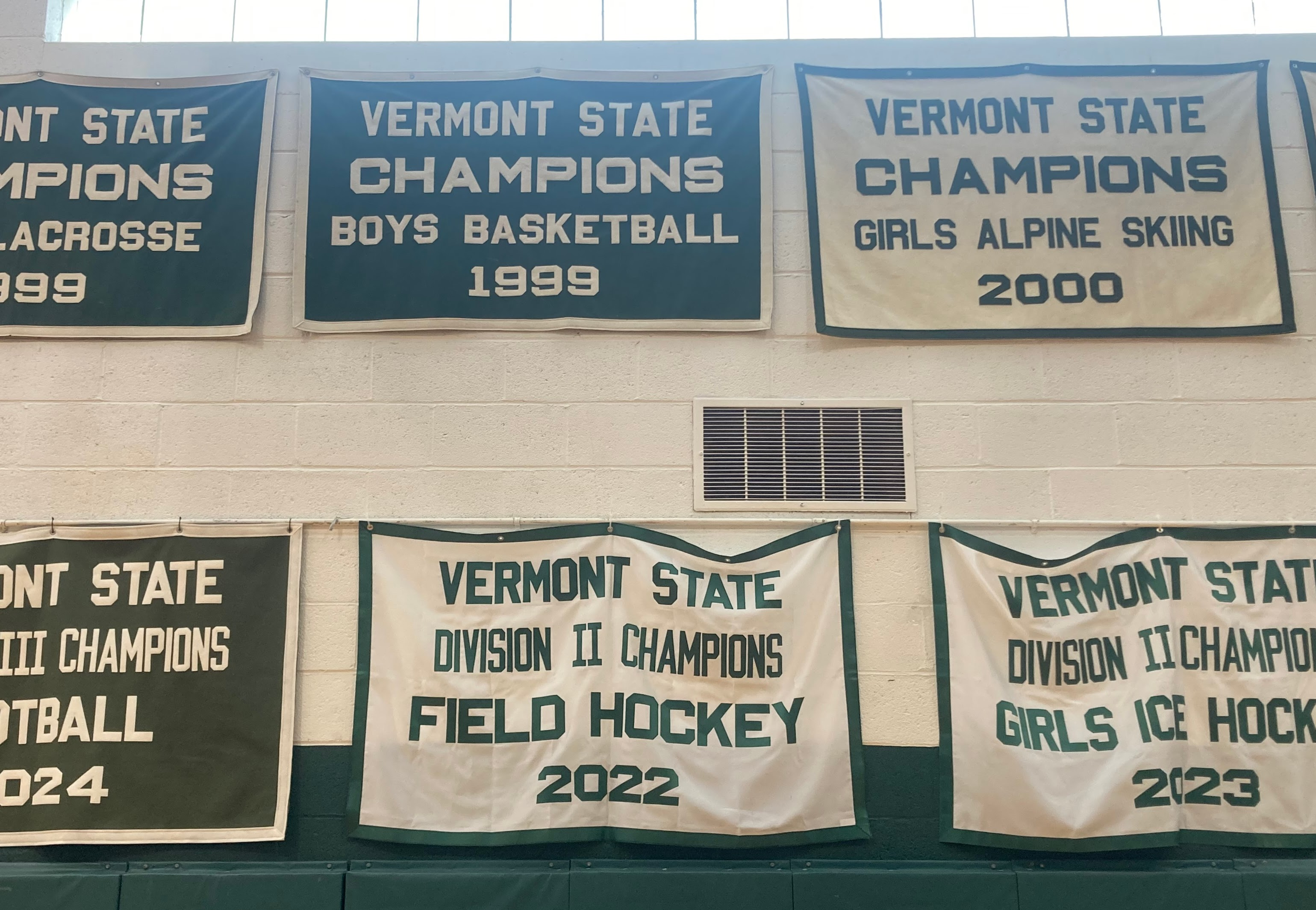
As of September 2025, 91 athletic championship banners were displayed in the Woodstock Union High School gymnasium.

spring: baseball, boys and girls lacrosse, softball, boys and girls tennis, track and field

Athletic State Championships

2025-2026: mountain biking, girls snowboard, girls Nordic skiing

2024-2025: football, mountain biking, boys Nordic skiing

2023-2024: girls snowboard, boys Nordic skiing

2022-2023: field hockey, girls hockey, girls snowboard, mountain biking (Vermont Youth Cycling series)

2021-2022: girls hockey

2018-2019: football, boys hockey

2017-2018: boys hockey

== Yoh theatre ==
The WUHS theatre program typically offers five different productions a year that involve high school and middle school students, teachers, and community members. Yoh's 2024-2025 performances included Front by Robert Caisley, Head Over Heals by Jeff Whitty, and As You Like It by William Shakespeare.

Teachers including Harriet Y. Worrell and Marcia Bender helped establish the culture of Yoh. Worrell introduced the Speakchorus, which students continue to perform in Woodstock's annual commencement ceremony.

In August 2025 members of the Yoh theater traveled to Scotland to participate in the Edinburgh Fringe Festival. They performed Too Much Light Makes the Baby Go Blind: 30 plays in 60 minutes by Greg Allen.

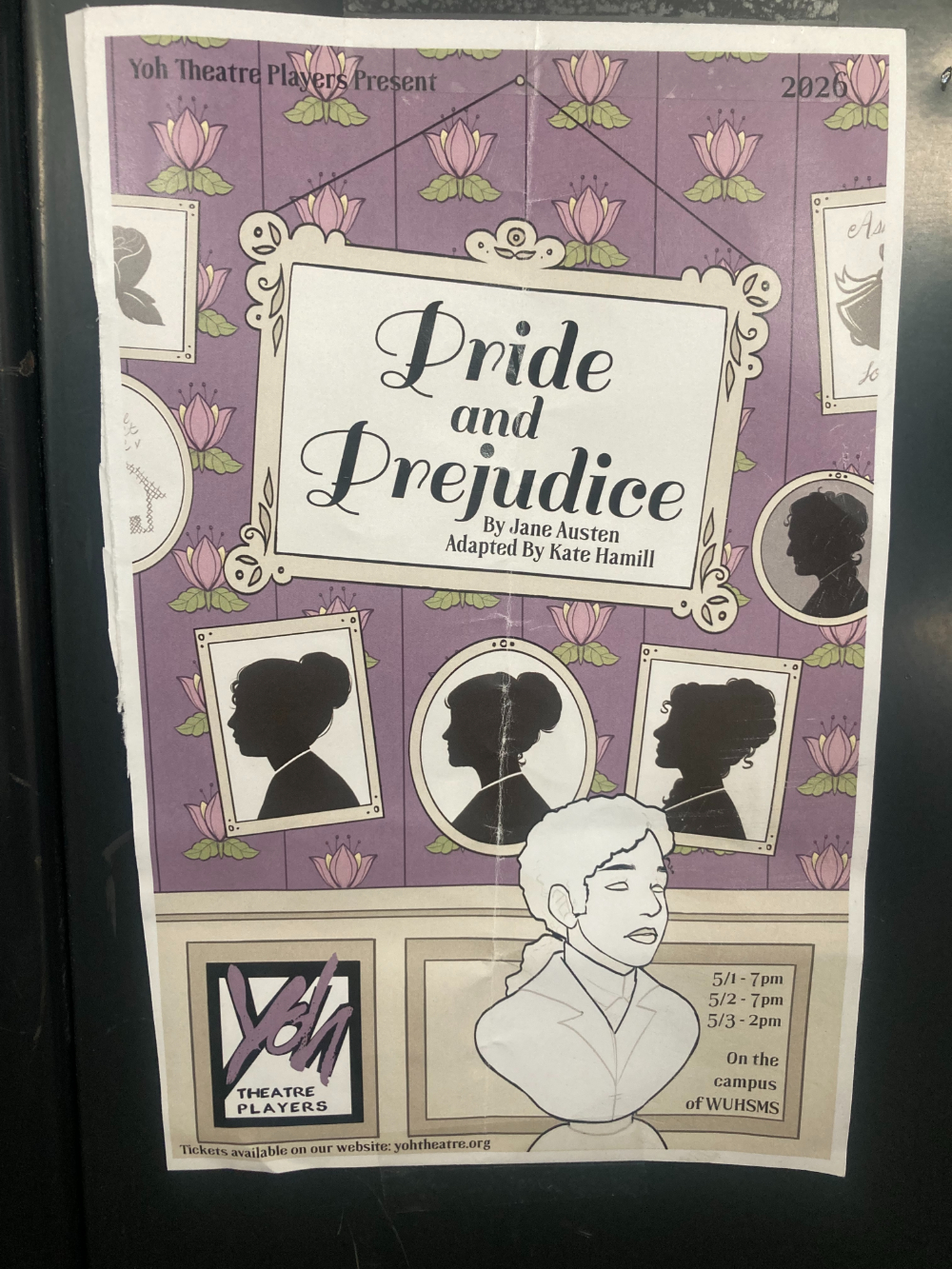
The Yoh Theatre Players performed Pride and Prejudice May 1-3, 2026 at Woodstock Union High School.

== Student organizations ==
Direct student leadership opportunities at WUHS consist of student government and student council. Each class has a president, vice president, secretary, and treasurer, as well as representatives on student council. Traditionally, two seniors serve as student representatives on the School Board.

Clubs at WUHS are advised by one or more faculty members. Organizations in 2024-2025 included Catan club, chess club, computer team, corner dwellers creative writing club, earth beat, French club, Future Farmers of America, gaming (D&D), math team, outing club, queer straight alliance, safe school ambassadors, scholars bowl, social action club, Spanish club, VTLSP/OVX, YADB book club, yearbook club.

== Post graduation ==
Woodstock graduates attend 4-year and 2-year colleges, begin trade apprenticeships, and enter the workforce. Graduates attend selective institutions including in the Ivy League, NESCAC, and Liberty League.

From 2022 to 2026, the top schools for Woodstock Union High School graduates to attend were the University of Vermont (35), Vermont State University (15), Providence College (7), St. Lawrence University (6), Middlebury College (5), Plymouth State University (5), Clarkson University (4), George Washington University (4), Northeastern University (4), Rensselaer Polytechnic Institute (4), and the University of Massachusetts, Amherst (4).

== Alumni ==
There is an active WUHS Alumni Association that hosts events in Woodstock. During the traditional Alumni Weekend in June, graduates representing the 50 year reunion class attend Commencement, and the association organizes a parade on the Saturday following graduation. In 2026, the Alumni Association presented prizes to the best floats in three categories: humorous, original, and artistic. According to a Vermont Standard article on June 4, 2026, the first Alumni Weekend started in 1942. "After graduation, they tried to have a parade, which they'd never had, to thank the boys that were joining up to go and fight in World War II," said Dennis Wright, coordinator for the Class of 1976. "They didn't know how it would go, but it was a huge success. It's been a big deal to me ever since I was a kid, going to the parade."

== Notable alumni ==
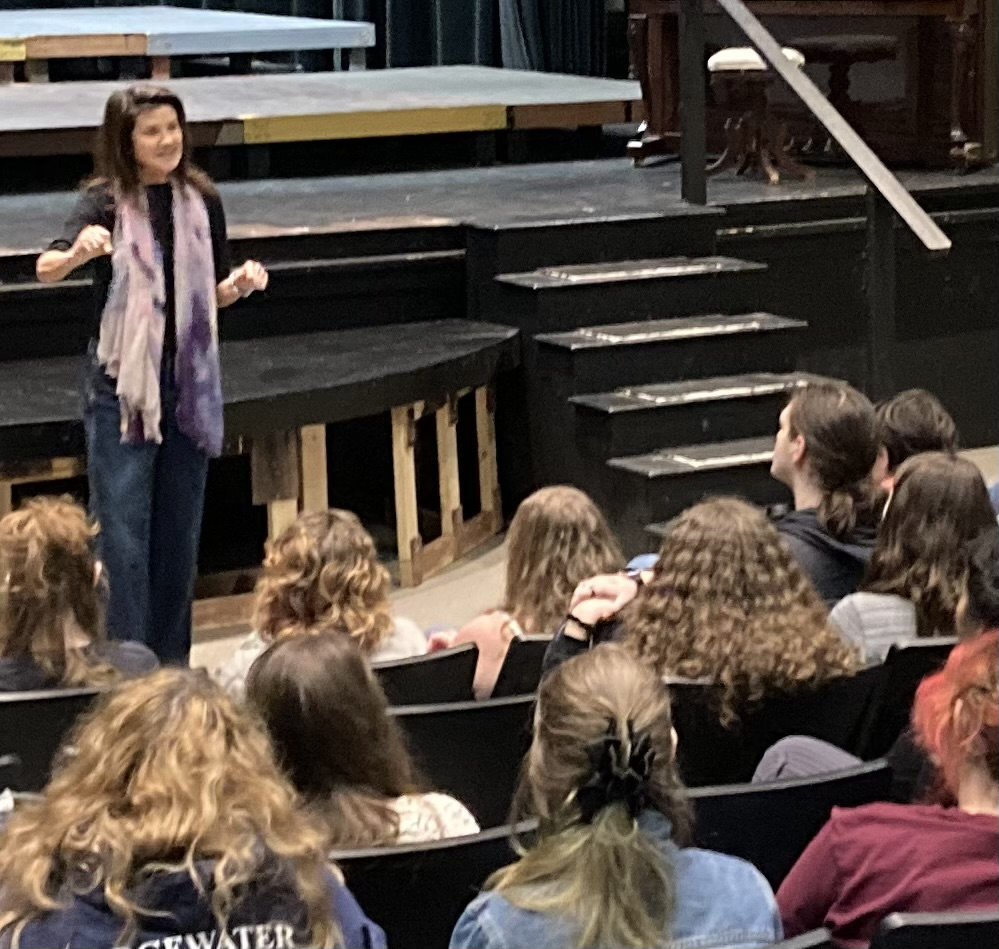
- Woodstock Union High School graduate Daphne Zuniga speaks to Woodstock's Yoh theater students on April 7, 2026.
  Victor Ambros, Class of 1971, discoverer of miRNA, winner of many international awards, including the 2024 Nobel Prize in Physiology or Medicine, Lasker Award, Breakthrough Prize, Gairdner Foundation International Award, Keio Medical Science Prize, Wolf Prize in Medicine
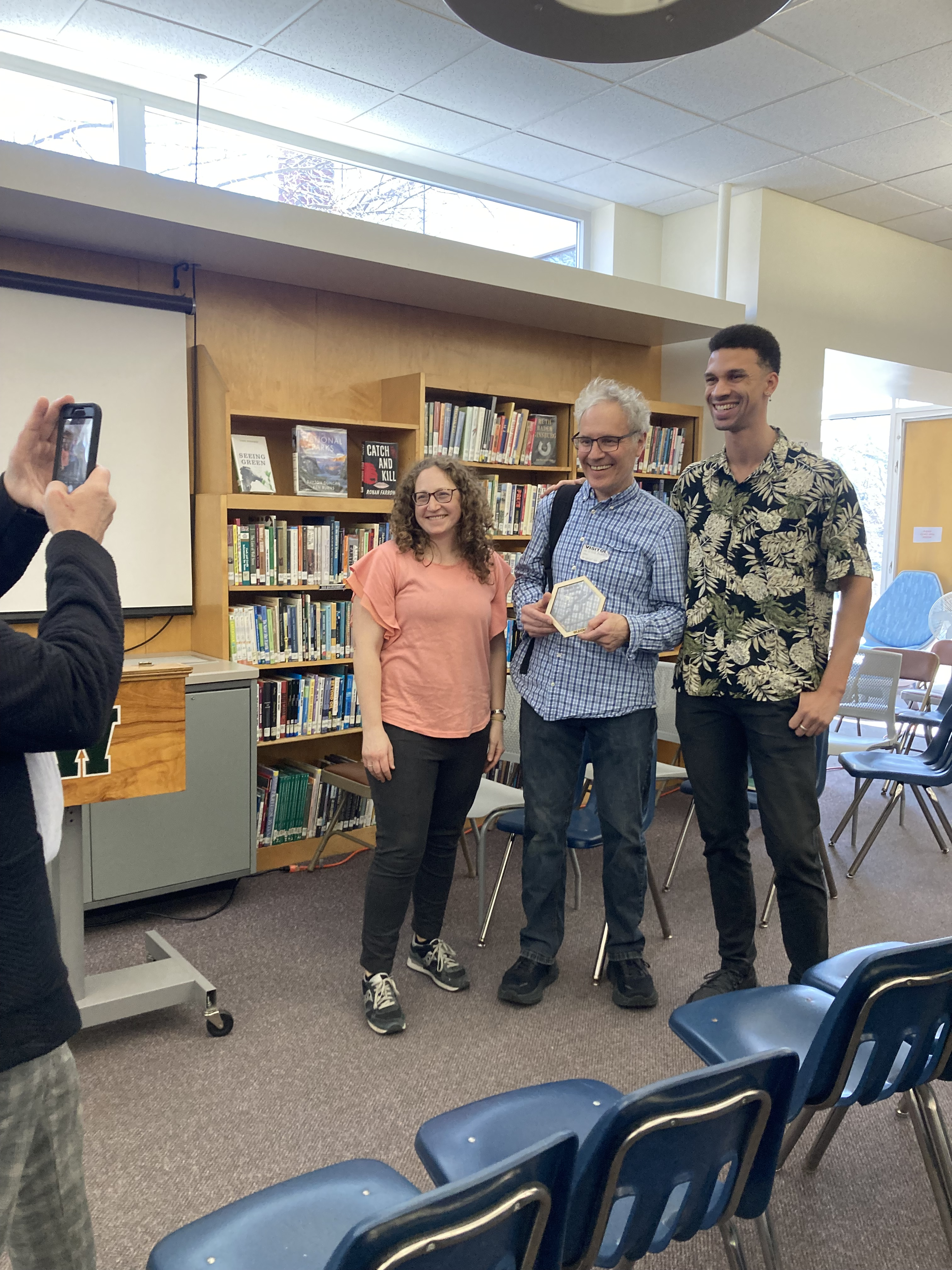
  Victor Ambros (center) spoke with Woodstock Union High School students at the Rhoda Teagle Library on April 4, 2025. Following the event, Ambros chatted with Science Teacher Vanessa Cramer (left) and NuVu Fellow Ben Johnson.
- Keegan Bradley is an American professional golfer on the PGA Tour. He won the 2011 PGA Championship and was named the 2025 Team USA Ryder Cup captain. He attended Woodstock Union High School through his junior year.
- John C. Sherburne was Vermont's first Rhodes Scholar and Chief Justice of the Vermont Supreme Court.
- Miro Weinberger, Class of 1988, served as the 42nd mayor of Burlington, Vermont.
- Daphne Zuniga, Class of 1980. After graduating she became a Theater Arts major at the University of California. She acted in Melrose Place, as Victoria Davis on The CW teen drama, One Tree Hill, as Princess Vespa in Spaceballs and opposite John Cusack in "The Sure Thing."

== Sources ==
- Woodstock Uhsd #4. National Center for Education Statistics. Retrieved on 2011-11-30.
- Wendling, Kathy (1989). "From One Room School to Union High School: The History of Windsor Central Supervisory Union".
