= Barnard General Store =

General store in Barnard, Vermont

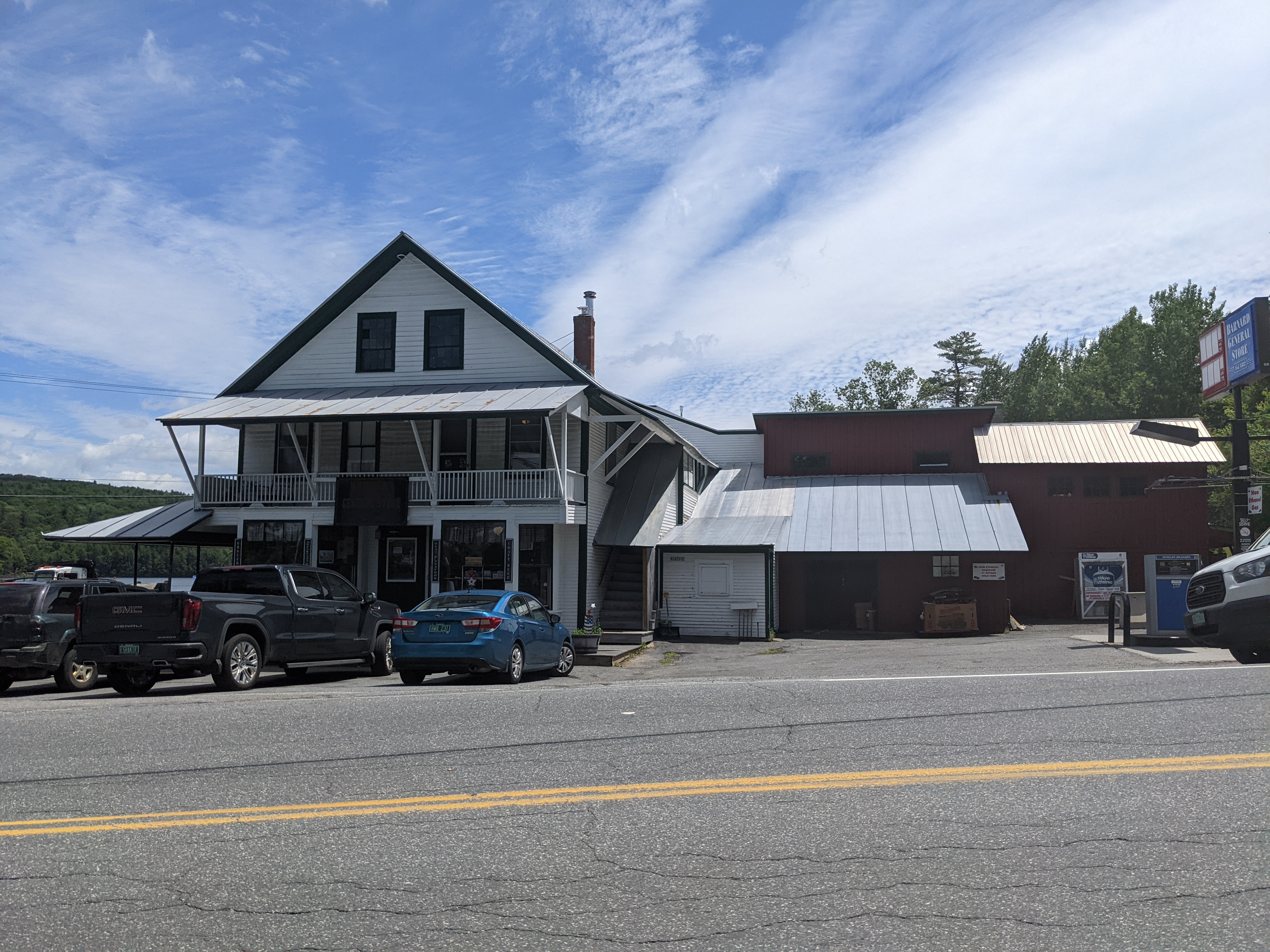
- Interactive map of the Barnard General Store area

General information
- Location: 6134 VT Route 12, Barnard, Vermont
- Coordinates: 43.728292°N 72.618627°W
- Opened: 1832
- Owner: Barnard Community Trust

Website
- www.bgsvt.com

The Barnard General Store is a general store in Barnard, Vermont. The store first opened in 1832. It is considered the commercial and social center of the town. It has been in near-continuous operation since its opening, with only a brief closure in 2012–2013. The store is owned by the Barnard Community Trust, a resident-operated organization that leases the building's space to the store's business owner.

The store is one of four historic landmarks notable to the Town of Barnard.

== Attributes ==
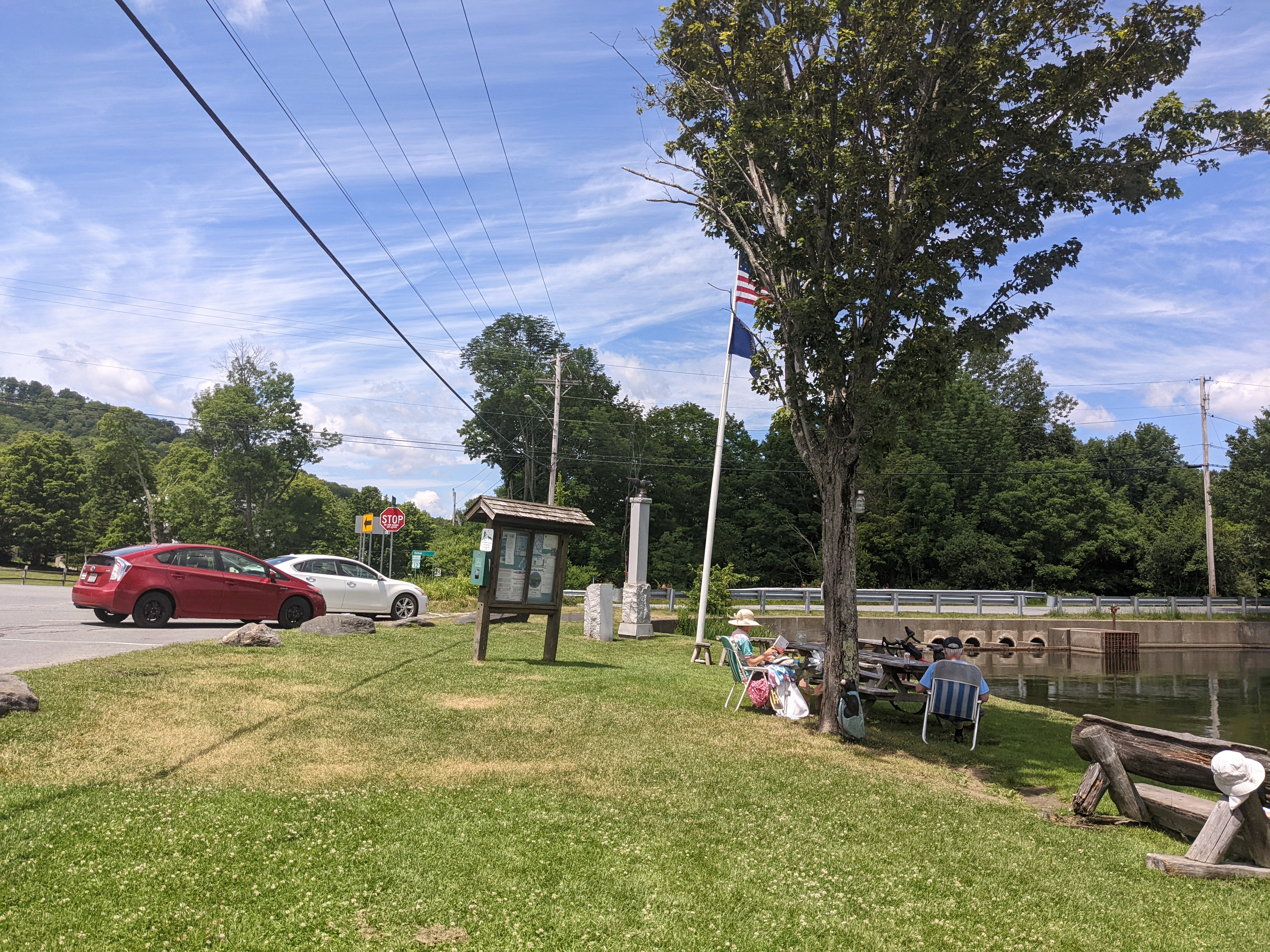
The Beach at Silver Lake

The store serves a community of just under 1,000 people, in addition to tourists, second-home owners, and guests at the nearby Silver Lake State Park. It is considered the commercial and social center of the town. The general store has produce, dry and canned groceries at the front of the store. Its deli, cafe, and ice cream counter, at the back of the store, prepares breakfasts and lunches. It is the only grocery store in Barnard.

The 1.25-acre (0.51 ha) general store property includes a boat rack, used by residents for recreation on Silver Lake, a fueling area for snowmobilers, as well as an area called "The Beach at Silver Lake", a pocket park with a grassy lawn, picnic tables, a historic monument, war memorial, flagpole, signboard, and a sandy area for swimmers.

The Town of Barnard considers the general store one of four historic structures within its boundaries; the others are the Danforth Library, the East Barnard Community Hall, and the Barnard Town Hall.

== History ==
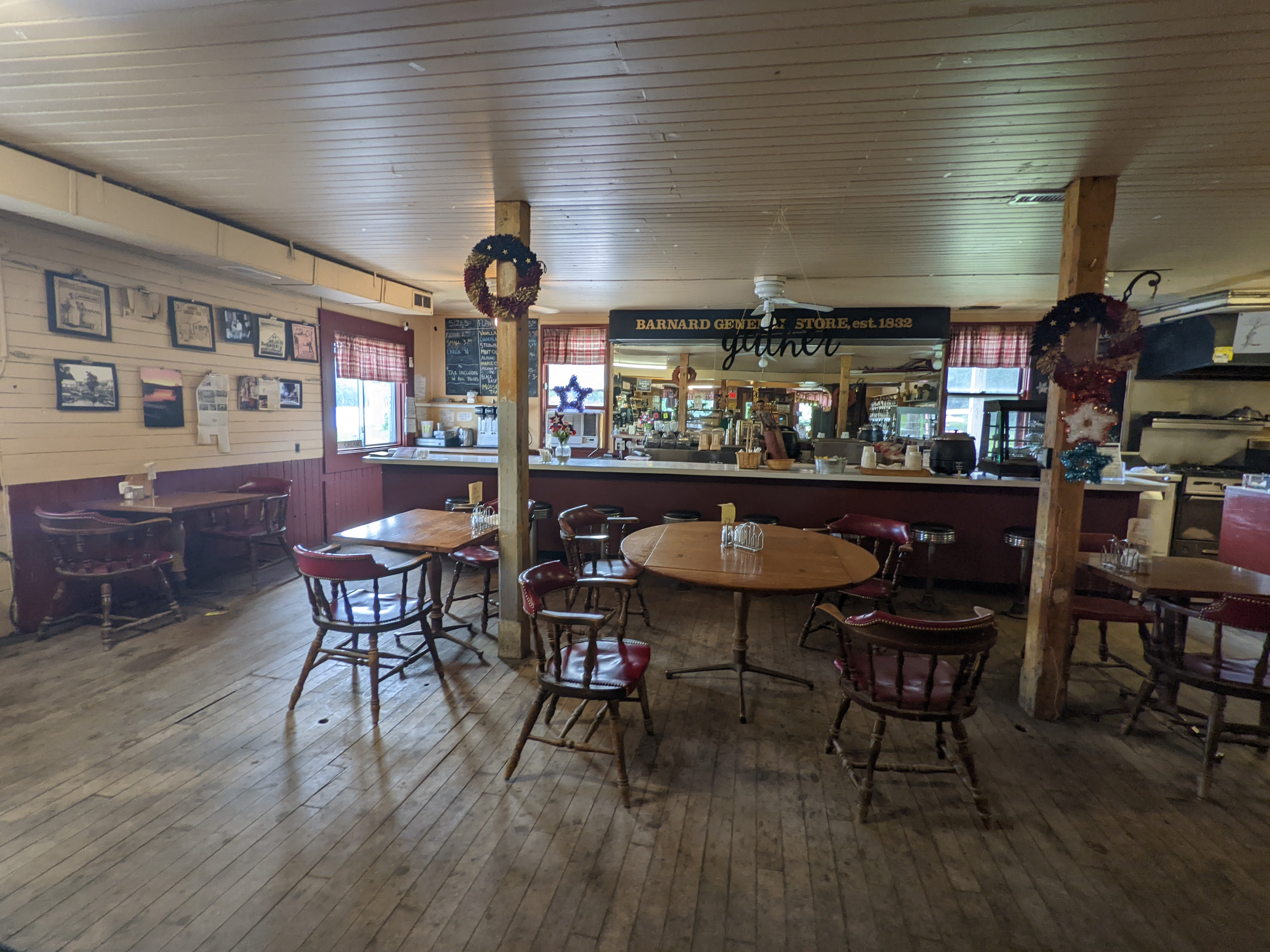
The store's café

The Barnard General Store opened in 1832 as a union cooperative, built at the corners of Creek, Gulf (present-day Rt. 12), Stage, and North Roads. The Silver Lake House, a hotel, was also built that year, opposite the general store, though it was dismantled in 1937. At its height, the two buildings were also joined in the village by a gristmill, two sawmills, a blacksmith, a tannery, marble shop, wheelwright, and two carding mills. Throughout its operation, entire families have operated the store, and it saw difficulties including a declining population, a disastrous flood in 1927, and a hurricane in 1938. Railroads were constructed bypassing Barnard, and Interstate 89 lessened the necessity for local general stores. The opening of Silver Lake State Park in 1954 improved business.

In 2007, the store commemorated 175 years of operation, with a full day of celebratory events.

It operated for 180 years under about eighteen different owners until closing in May 2012 under the 18-year ownership of Kim Furlong and Carolyn DiCicco. The couple attributed their decision to close on the recession and increase in internet shopping. As well, Hurricane Irene's damages and a winter with little snowfall led to less tourist traffic in Barnard. At the time, it was one of only about 70–80 historic general stores left in Vermont.

After its closure, town residents decided to donate $500,000 to purchase the building and its 1.25 acres and reopen it, where it became operated through a new non-profit entity, the Barnard Community Trust. This relatively unique effort to sustain the store was guided by the Preservation Trust of Vermont. Once purchased, volunteers operated the store, and coffee, baked goods, and newspapers were sold in return for donations to reopen the store officially.

Joe Minerva and Jillian Bradley were the first to lease the store operation from the trust. The store fully reopened on May 1, 2013; the couple added bins for bulk dry goods, snack foods, and a larger freezer to hold frozen foods. The business owners also moved to have fresher and more local foods, including an on-site butcher.

In 2020, at the height of the COVID-19 pandemic, the store operators pledged to remain open despite the significant threat, as the store is essential to the community. The store implemented a home-delivery system and curbside pickup for residents to buy groceries, and the employees utilized masks, gloves, and sanitizers to prevent the virus's spread.
