= St. Francis Episcopal School =

Private school in Texas, United States

Coordinates: 29.758414°N 95.518808°W

St. Francis Episcopal School (1952-2016)

Location
- 335 Piney Point Road, Houston, TX 77024; Piney Point Village

Information
- Former name: St. Francis Episcopal Day School (1952-2016)
- Motto: People for Others
- Founded: 1952
- Head of school: Dr. Chelsea Collins
- Chaplain: Bob Wismer
- Grades: K–12
- Age range: Ages 2 to 18
- Campuses: Piney Point Village Campus Mary Frances Bowles Couper Campus
- Colors: Blue, Gray
- Athletics conference: Houston Junior Preparatory Conference (HJPC)
- Sports: Football, Basketball, Baseball, Volleyball, Soccer, Track & Field, Wrestling, Softball, Swimming, Lacrosse, Field Hockey, Cross Country
- Mascot: Wolves
- Team name: Wolves
- Yearbook: The Howler

St. Francis Episcopal School, formerly St. Francis Episcopal Day School, is a private Episcopal school located on two campuses in the City of Piney Point Village and the Memorial area of Houston, Texas, United States. In fall 2018, St. Francis opened a high school on the Couper Campus (2300 S. Piney Point Rd., Houston, TX 77063), and its inaugural freshman class graduated in 2022. The Piney Point Campus and affiliated parish, located at 335 Piney Point Rd., house the lower and middle schools. The Couper Campus is home to primary and upper school facilities, along with athletic fields used by the middle school. With over 900 students, St. Francis Episcopal School was once the largest K–8 Episcopal parish day school in the United States. In the 1998–1999 school year, St. Francis was named a National Blue Ribbon School.

== History and facilities ==
A coeducational school, St. Francis was founded in 1952 as a mission of St. Francis Episcopal Church. For its first year, it welcomed a class of 24 preschoolers and gradually expanded into elementary education. In 1965, Sarah W. Woolrich, who originally joined St. Francis faculty in 1959 as a first-grade teacher, was named St. Francis's first head of school. The current interim head of school is Donald C. North.

The school continued to expand and by 1973 included sixth-grade classes. Between 1978 and 1985, capital campaigns funded the construction of a gymnasium, dining hall, additional classrooms, and the Sarah W. Woolrich Education Building. In 1997, the school added an Outdoor Activity Center and in 2001 opened a new Lower School Building, library, Fine Arts Center, and technology center, along with a renovated dining hall, gymnasium, and common area. The Woods Outdoor Classroom was established in 2011.

The school had renovated the dining hall in 2022 to make it more modern and updated, along with some other improvements to the interior of the school.

The Parish Hall, established in 1952, was demolished in 2022, to make a new, updated Parish Hall for St. Francis Episcopal Church.

The Student Life Building on the Couper Campus opened in January 2023.

Today, the school serves students from age 2 years through 12th grade on two sites - the original Piney Point Campus and Couper Campus - together totaling 39 acres providing ample room for the school's 600-seat state-of-the-art Fine Arts Center, 7,000-square-foot library and technology center, and nine acres of regulation playing fields for a wide variety of sports.

== Leadership and accreditation ==
Since its founding, St. Francis has been led by six heads of school: Sarah Woolrich (1965–1986); Dr. Kay P. Walther (1986–1993); Dr. Annette Smith (1994–2000); Dr. Susan Lair (2001–2017); Stephen Lovejoy (2017–2022); and Dr. Chelsea Pope Collins (2023–present).

St. Francis Episcopal School is accredited by the Southwestern Association of Episcopal Schools and the Independent Schools Association of the Southwest.

In addition, the school is a member of the following organizations including:

- ACT
- Association for Childhood Education International
- Association of College Counselors in Independent Schools
- Association for Supervision and Curriculum Development
- College Board
- Council for Advancement and Support of Education
- Houston Area Independent Schools
- International Reading Association
- National Association for College Admission Counseling
- National Association for the Education of Young Children
- National Association of Episcopal Schools
- National Association of Elementary School Principals
- National Association of Independent Schools
- National Association of Secondary School Principals
- National Association of Student Councils
- National Council for the Social Studies
- National Middle School Association
- National Council of Teachers of Mathematics
- National Junior Honor Society
- National Middle School Association
- North American Reggio Emilia Alliance
- Texas Association for College Admission Counseling
- Texas Association of Non-Public Schools
- Texas Library Association
- Texas Music Educators Association
- Texas Nonprofits

== Athletics ==
St. Francis Episcopal School is a member of the Houston Junior Preparatory Conference (HJPC) and has won 32 conference championships including: Football 2003, 2006, 2008, 2011, 2019; Cross-Country 2006; Field Hockey 2002; Volleyball 2011, 2015, 2016; Boys Basketball 2008–09, 2011–12, 2013–14; Girls Soccer 2000–01; Wrestling 2003–04, 2004–05, 2005–06; Softball 2004, 2007, 2010, 2012; Baseball 2013; Boys Lacrosse 2007, 2012, 2014; Track and Field 2002, 2022 (Boys); Boys Tennis 2015; Boys Golf 2018, 2019, 2023; and Girls Basketball 2020-21. Starting in the 2022-23 school year, St. Francis's high school sports became part of TAPPS, and its boys basketball team advanced to the state championship.

== Incidents ==
On July 30, 2020 at approximately 10:30pm, a fire broke out in the historic house at the south campus. When the Houston Fire Department arrived at the scene, they found heavy fire and smoke coming from the building. The fire was put out 25 minutes later. There were no reported injuries. Due to the fire, the building was demolished. The school raised funds for a brand-new building on the site, which was completed in early 2023.

== Notable alumni ==
- Wes Anderson, award-winning filmmaker (Golden Globe, Oscar nomination, known for Rushmore)
- Charles Andrew Doyle, Episcopal Bishop
- Leven Rambin, actress (known for role in The Hunger Games)
- Amir Taghi, fashion designer
- Stephen Wrabel, musician & songwriter (known as Wrabel)
