= CMLA =

CMLA may refer to:

- Canadian Music Library Association, now the Canadian Association of Music Libraries, Archives and Documentation Centres
- Chief Martial Law Administrator
- Collegiate Middle Level Association
