= Wales N. Johnson House =

Historic house in Vermont, United States

- U.S. National Register of Historic Places
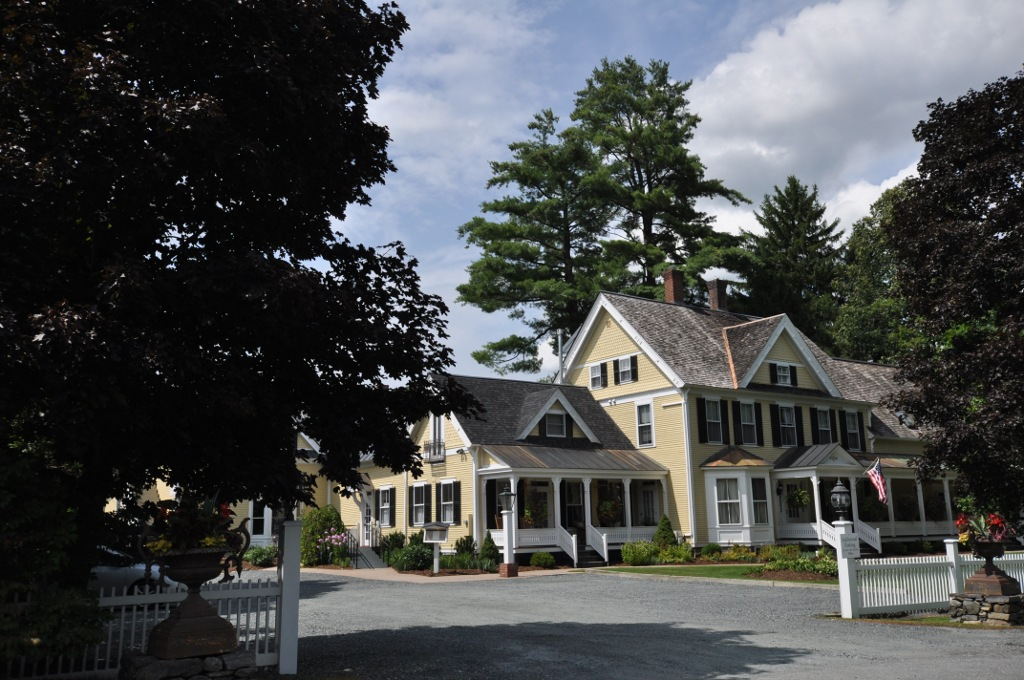

- Location within Vermont
- Location: 43 Senior Ln., Woodstock, Vermont
- Coordinates: 43°36′44″N 72°33′0″W
- Area: 3 acres (1.2 ha)
- Built: 1890
- Built by: Johnson, Wales N.
- Architectural style: Queen Anne
- NRHP reference No.: 95001258
- Added to NRHP: November 7, 1995

The Wales N. Johnson House is a historic house at 43 Senior Lane in Woodstock, Vermont. Built in 1889-90 by the owner of a local sawmill, it is a high quality example of vernacular Queen Anne architecture. Now serving as the Jackson House Inn, it was listed on the National Register of Historic Places in 1995.

== Description and history ==
The Wales N. Johnson House is located southwest of Woodstock village, on the northwest side of Senior Lane, a former alignment of United States Route 4, whose present alignment passes just to the southeast. The original house is now at the center of a rambling complex of additions, extending mainly to its north and west. The house is 2 1/2 stories in height, with a gabled roof, mostly clapboarded exterior, and granite foundation. The gable ends and gabled dormers feature Victorian cut shingles and vergeboard decoration on the rake edges. A 1 1/2-story addition extends to the southwest, exhibiting similar styling. Porches extend across most of the main block and this addition, with chamfered square posts, jigsawn brackets, and decorative balustrades. Brackets similar to those on the porch are also found at the main roof cornice. The interior of the house features a fairly typical Georgian central hall plan, altered to open the spaces somewhat, and to provide access to the more modern wings of the building. It is richly decorated in a wide variety of woods and finishes, exhibiting to versatility of the original building owner's wood products.

The house was built in 1889-90 for Wales N. Johnson, the owner of a sawmill in nearby West Woodstock. It is one of a relatively small number of houses built in Woodstock during the late 19th century, a local economic depression occasioned by the rise of more industrialized communities and the availability of better land for settlement in the American west. Johnson kept detailed accounts of the house construction, and oversaw the cutting of the wood (taken mostly from land he owned) at his own mill. For most of the years since 1940, the house has served as a tourist accommodation, under a variety of names.

== See also ==
- National Register of Historic Places listings in Windsor County, Vermont
