= West Woodstock Bridge =

- U.S. National Register of Historic Places
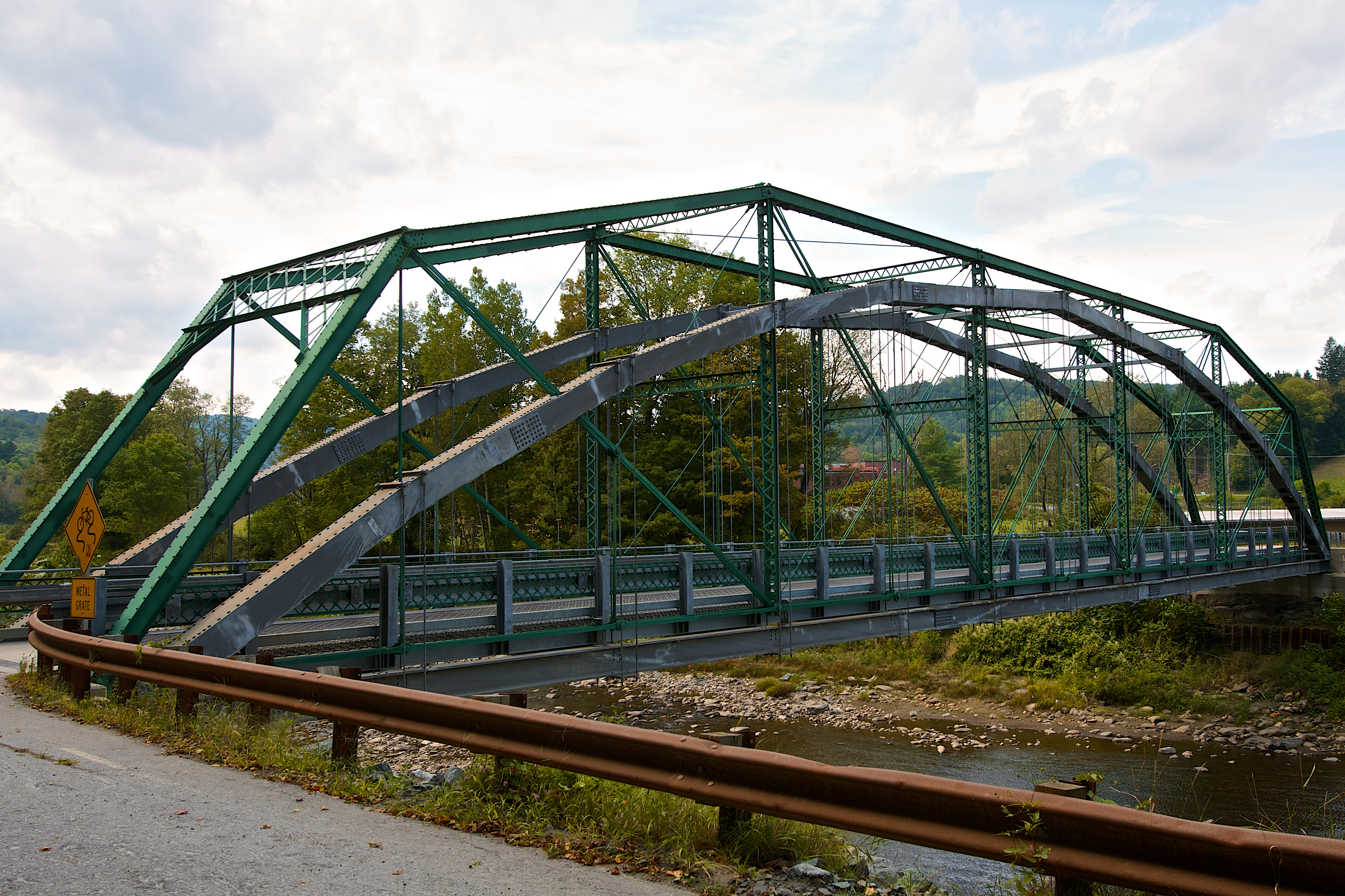

- Location within Vermont Location within the United States
- Location: Mill Rd. (Town Hwy. 50) over the Ottauquechee River, West Woodstock, Vermont
- Coordinates: 43°36′51″N 72°32′36″W
- Area: less than one acre
- Built: 1900
- Built by: Groton Bridge & Manufacturing Co.
- Architectural style: Pennsylvania through truss
- MPS: Metal Truss, Masonry, and Concrete Bridges in Vermont MPS
- NRHP reference No.: 92001038
- Added to NRHP: August 27, 1992

The West Woodstock Bridge is a historic steel bridge, carrying Mill Road across the Ottauquechee River in the village of West Woodstock, Vermont. Built in 1900, it is the oldest documented Pennsylvania through truss bridge in the state. It was listed on the National Register of Historic Places in 1992.

== Description and history ==
The West Woodstock Bridge stands just north of Woodstock Union High School, spanning the Ottauquechee River east of U.S. Route 4 (US 4) in an east–west orientation. It is a single-span Pennsylvania through truss, a variant of the Pratt truss with additional vertical members, and its elements are connected by pins instead of rivets. It is 174 feet (53 m) in length, and rests on rubblestone abutments. It is 16.3 feet (5.0 m) wide, carrying two lanes of traffic, and has a portal height of 14.4 feet (4.4 m). The deck consists of rolled I-beam stringers with wooden flooring. Elements of bridge exhibit modest Victorian styling.

The bridge was fabricated by the Groton Manufacturing Company of New York, and is one of two bridges in the state known to be manufactured by them. The company had originally offered the town an already-built structure intended for a different location in New York at a discount price, but was forced to build a new structure at a loss when the first was retained by the first municipality at a different location. The bridge abutments are believed to stand on foundations dating to 1789.

== See also ==
- List of bridges on the National Register of Historic Places in Vermont
- National Register of Historic Places listings in Windsor County, Vermont
