= AMLE =

AMLE may refer to:

- Academy of Management Learning and Education, an academic journal
- Aontas na Mac Léinn in Éirinn (AMLÉ), formerly the Union of Students in Ireland, represents third-level students in Ireland
- Association for Middle Level Education, international association concerned with middle level grades of school students
