= Gesu Church (Milwaukee, Wisconsin) =

Historic church in Wisconsin, United States

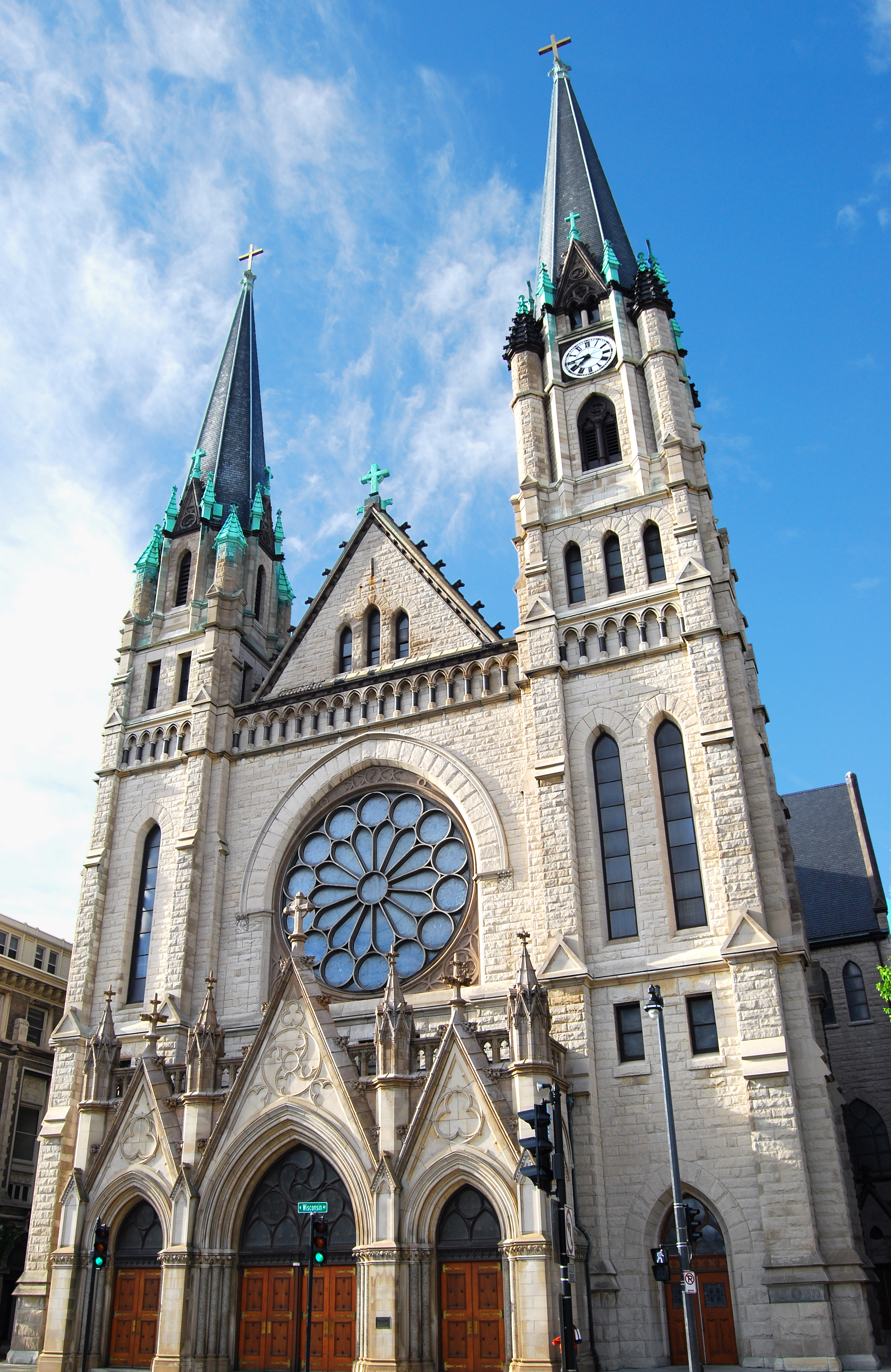

- Location within Wisconsin
- 43°2′18″N 87°55′38″W
- Location: 1145 W. Wisconsin Ave. Milwaukee, Wisconsin
- Country: United States
- Denomination: Roman Catholic

History
- Status: Parish church
- Founded: 1887 (Gesu Parish)
- Founder: Society of Jesus

Architecture
- Functional status: Active
- Heritage designation: NRHP
- Designated: 1986
- Architect(s): Koch, Henry C.; Et al.
- Style: French Gothic, Gothic Revival
- Completed: 1894

Administration
- Province: Jesuits Midwest Province
- Archdiocese: Milwaukee
- Parish: Gesu

Clergy
- Pastor(s): Fr. Michael R. Simone, S.J.
- Gesu Church
- U.S. National Register of Historic Places
- Area: less than one acre
- MPS: West Side Area MRA
- NRHP reference No.: 86000108
- Added to NRHP: January 16, 1986

Gesu Church is a Jesuit parish of the Roman Catholic Archdiocese of Milwaukee located in Milwaukee, Wisconsin. It is listed on the National Register of Historic Places and was designated a Milwaukee Landmark in 1975.

Although the church is not affiliated with Marquette University, through a 1991 partnership, it ministers to the downtown campus of Marquette and surrounding neighborhood.

== Description ==
Gesu, founded 177 years ago in 1849 as St. Gall's Parish, initially served English-speaking Irish Catholics from the near south and west sides of Milwaukee in what was the neighborhood of Tory Hill. As the parish grew, it built Holy Name Church in 1875, and by 1887 Jesuit officials combined the two parishes into one church. The Gesu name was chosen in 1893 to honor the Church of the Gesu in Rome, where St. Ignatius of Loyola, founder of the Society of Jesus, is buried.

The cornerstone was laid on May 23, 1893, with over 20,000 in attendance. A dedication ceremony followed on December 17, 1894, to mark the formal completion of the church.

Actor Pat O'Brien (1899–1983) served as an altar boy at Gesu while growing up near 13th and Clybourn streets. He attended Marquette Academy (a preparatory department that later became Marquette University High School) with Spencer Tracy (1900–1967), and later attended Marquette University.

Gesu Church holds daily Masses and attracts over 2,500 worshipers on weekends.

In late 1954, the church held the funeral for Miller Brewing Company president Fred Miller and his son, Fred, Jr., attended by thousands.

== Architecture and fittings ==
Architect Henry C. Koch designed the French Gothic building, drawing inspiration from the Cathedral of Chartres in France. It features landmark spires of unequal height, a centered rose window, and stained glass windows. Harriet L. Cramer donated of the granite columns in the church's interior, said to be the only columns of this kind in the U.S.; they were placed there at a cost of US$20,000.

== Gallery ==
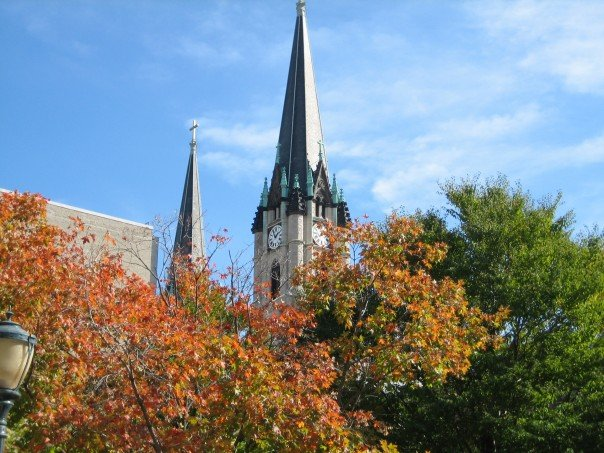
Gesu Church in autumn

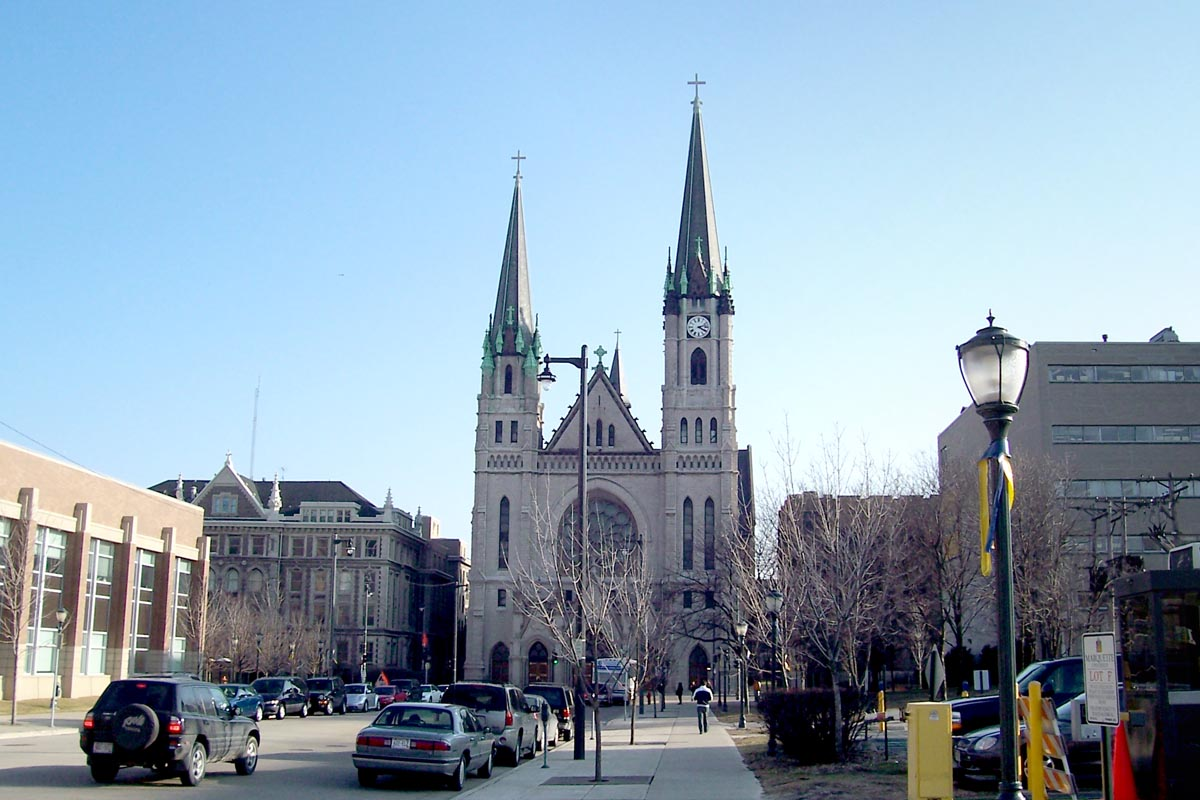
Gesu Church

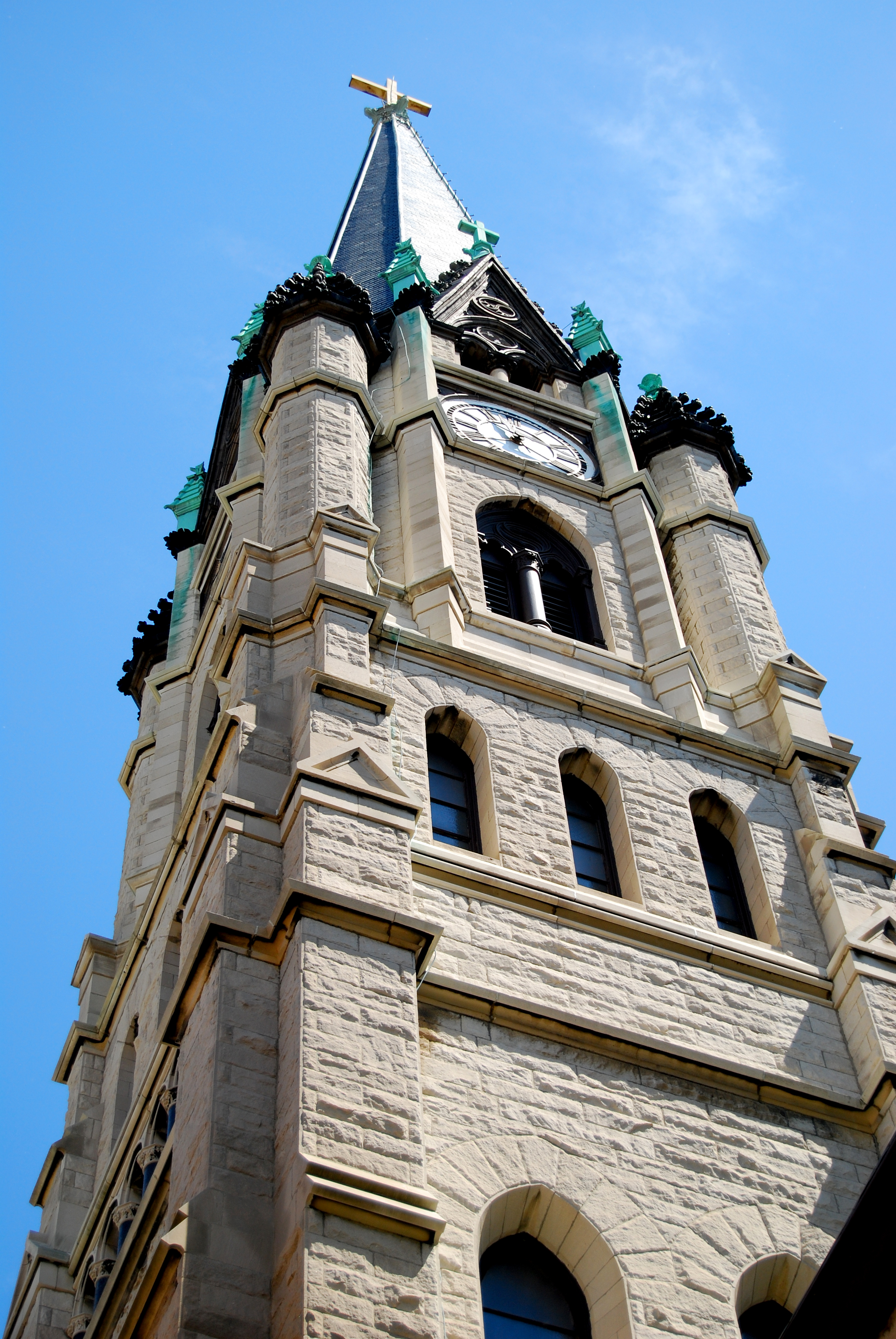
West tower

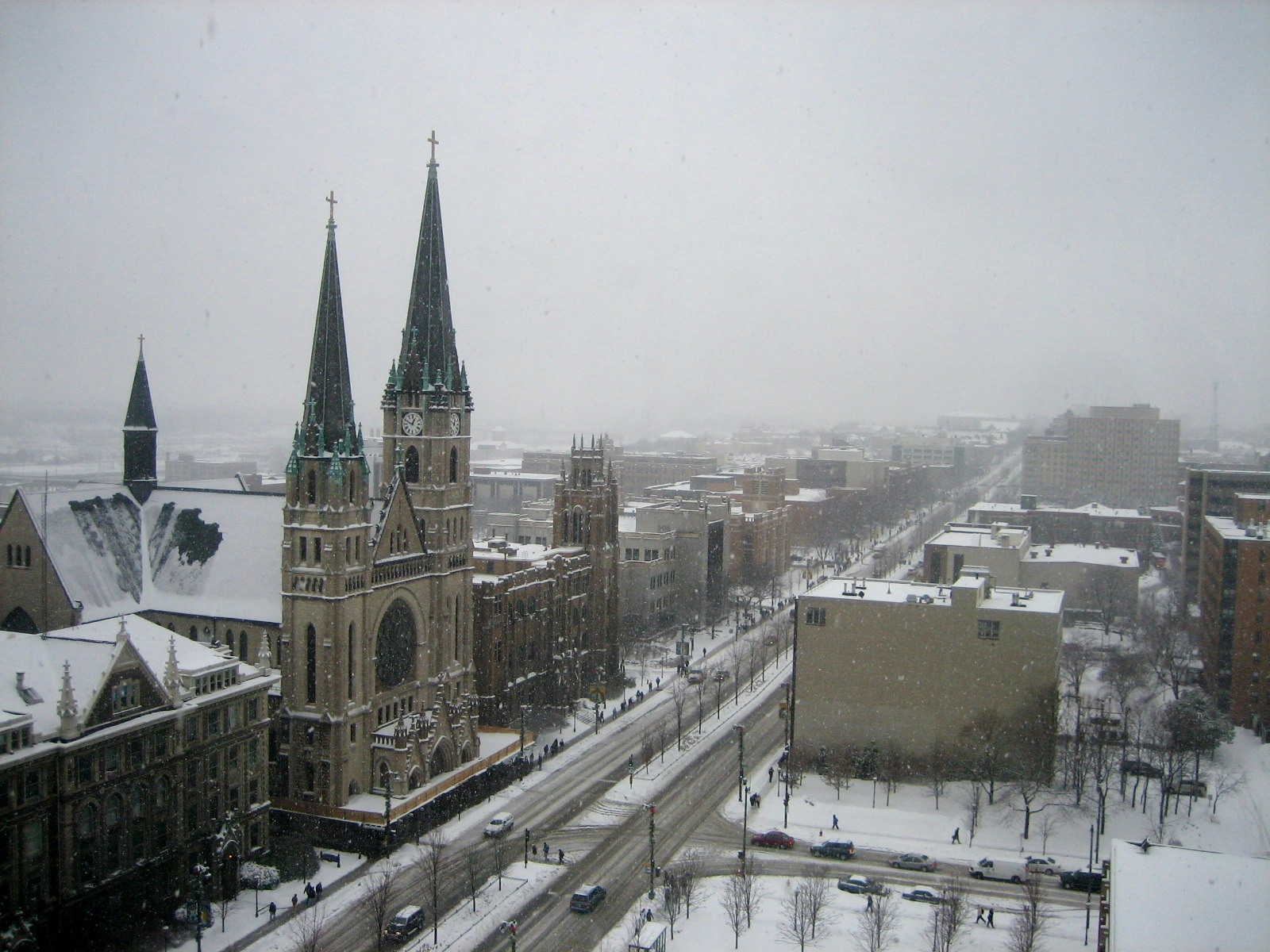

== See also ==
- List of Jesuit sites
