= Harriet L. Cramer =

American journalist

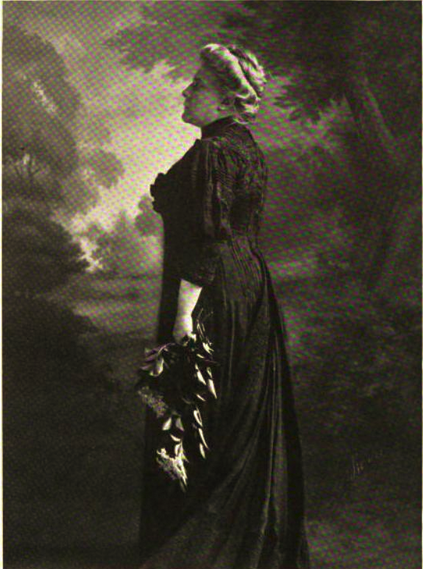
- Born: Harriet Laura Barker; February 14, 1848; Waupun, Wisconsin, U.S.
- Died: February 7, 1922 (aged 73); Milwaukee, Wisconsin, U.S.
- Occupations: editor; publisher
- Known for: The Evening Wisconsin
- Spouse: William Edward Cramer (m. 1869; died 1905)

Harriet L. Cramer (née, Barker; February 14, 1848 – February 7, 1922) was an American journalist. Starting off as a typesetter and proofreader at The Evening Wisconsin, a daily newspaper published in Milwaukee, Wisconsin, she went on to become its editor and publisher. She was also the president of The Evening Wisconsin Company, which, in addition to publishing one of the "Golden Dozen" of American newspapers, also conducted an extensive job printing department. Cramer was a benefactor of Marquette University; Cramer Hall is named in her honor.

== Early life ==
Harriet Laura Barker was born in Waupun, Wisconsin, (Note: According to the Forest Home Historians and the Forest Home Historic Preservation Association (2020), Cramer was born in Packwaukee, Wisconsin.) February 14, 1848. Her parents were Charles Granderson Barker and Alice (Doyle) Barker. As a descendant of John Barker (1764–1835), of New York who served in the Revolutionary War, Harriet was a member of the Daughters of the American Revolution.

== Career ==
=== Journalism ===
In 1864, she removed to Milwaukee. There, she was hired by The Evening Wisconsin in its composing room as a typesetter and proofreader.

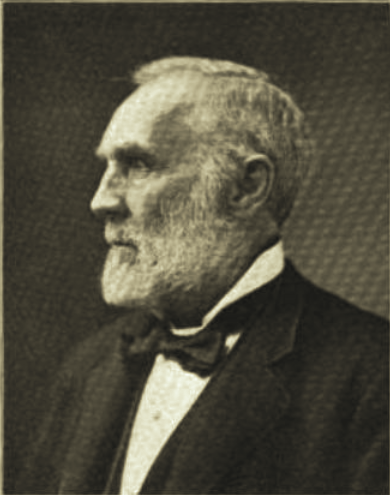
William Edward Cramer

In New York City, on June 25, 1869, she married William Edward Cramer (1817–1905), who was blind, deaf, and 30 years older than Harriet. He was the founder and editor of The Evening Wisconsin. Their honeymoon was an extensive tour of Europe. They were in Paris during the Franco-Prussian War, and were locked up in the besieged city for several months, until liberated, with other American residents, through the offices of the United States Minister Washburn and Chancellor Otto von Bismarck. They were also in Paris during the whole reign of the Commune, from March until July, 1871.

The Cramers resided in Milwaukee's Newhall House Hotel when it caught on fire on January 10, 1883. Harriet carried William to safety.

When Edward died in 1905, the widow was elected president of The Evening Wisconsin Company, and she continued the publication of the paper with Andrew J. Aikens and John F. Cramer (William E. Cramer's nephew) in the business office, and John G. Gregory as editor. After Aikens' death in 1909, Mrs. Cramer was assisted in the management by John F. Cramer and John W. Campsie. This arrangement continued for nine years, until June 1918, when Mrs. Cramer and her associates in the corporation disposed of The Evening Wisconsin to William H. Park, who up to the previous year, had been one of the owners and publishers of The Milwaukee Daily News.

Cramer was the first woman to be elected to honorary life membership in the Milwaukee Press Club.

=== Philanthropy ===
Cramer was the donor of the granite columns in the interior of the Gesu Church, in Milwaukee, said to be the only columns of this kind in the U.S., and were placed there at a cost of US$20,000. She, with her husband, gave 40 acres (16 ha) of ground in Milwaukee upon which the house and school of the Good Shepherd, a Catholic home for "wayward girls" in Wauwatosa, Wisconsin were situated. To this institution Mr. Cramer left a large sum of money at his death, and Mrs. Cramer constantly added to this.

The chief beneficiary of her will was Marquette University to which institution she left US$100,000 outright, and also the residium of her estate.

== Death and legacy ==
Harriet Laura Barker Cramer died in Milwaukee, February 7, 1922.

The university's Cramer Hall was named in her honor.
