= Milwaukee Press Club =

The Milwaukee Press Club, in Milwaukee, Wisconsin, is the oldest continuously operating press club in the United States. The club comprises journalists and others in the media in the Milwaukee area, as well as journalism educators, public relations and marketing professionals, students, and members of the general public.

== Club history ==
After efforts to establish a press club in Milwaukee failed in 1860, 1882, and 1883, four journalists formally established the Milwaukee Press Club on Nov. 1, 1885. The club was to be a means of bringing together newspaper professionals, as well elevate the profession in general. Since its founding, the club has expanded its membership to include journalists working in other media, editors, publishers and individuals with a specific professional interest in the press.

Harriet L. Cramer was an honorary life member of the club, the first woman to be so honored. Prior to 1971, the only female member of the club was Edna Dunlop who joined near the turn of the 20th century. Later, a “men only” policy was adopted. It was finally overturned in August 1971, after female journalists and the general public created an outcry against the antiquated practice, and picketed the club's meeting place. Mary Spletter was the first woman to cross the club's threshold, and in addition to having lunch at the club, she was asked to sign a plaque in honor of the occasion, adding to the club's historic collection.

While the Milwaukee Press Club prides itself on its steadfast tradition of fostering journalistic camaraderie, it's led a vagabond existence in terms of its physical home. The first Milwaukee Press Club headquarters were in the Herold building at the corner of Mason and Broadway streets. The club moved several times in the next 19 years before settling into the third floor of the Miller Building at the corner of Mason and Water streets in 1904. In 1914, the Press Club moved again, this time to the eighth floor of the Jung Building on Water Street. The club remained there for more than 30 years until 1948, when it relocated to the Fine Arts building on Wells Street. At some time during its years in the Fine Arts building, the club established a separate business headquarters, while the Fine Arts location remained a social gathering place for club members.

In 1983, the club moved to the Marc Plaza Hotel on Wisconsin Avenue. Several more moves occurred after 1983, including stints at the Brown Bottle Pub, the Germania building, the Posner building, and the Park East Hotel. Finally, in May 2000, the club unveiled its current meeting place, the Newsroom Pub, in cooperation with the nationally recognized Safe House restaurant and night club, at 137 E. Wells St. in the heart of the city's vibrant theatre district.

== Anubis the Cat ==
Anubis the Cat, in the MPC logo

One of the most interesting elements of the Newsroom Pub is Anubis, the club's mascot encased in an elaborate frame above the bar. Anubis, named after an Egyptian god, is a petrified cat that came into the Press Club's hands through means that remain murky. One story has it that two reporters in the 1890s came across the cat at the State Historical Society in Madison, where it was taken after being found between the walls of a building being demolished in Darlington, Wis. The two stole the cat – an act that apparently did not upset the Historical Society.

The Newsroom Pub hosts club Newsmaker Luncheons with Milwaukee and Wisconsin civic, business and organizational leaders, evening socials and events, and serves as a gathering place for the media and the general public. Newsmaker luncheon speakers are regularly quoted in Milwaukee media, relating to their talks. A secret passageway connects the Newsroom Pub to the Safe House bar and restaurant. In addition, at off-site locations the club presents and annual Gridiron Dinner that honors winners of the Wisconsin Excellence in Journalism contest, and an annual Milwaukee Media Hall of Fame banquet.

== Signature collection ==
One of the longest surviving traditions of the club is the collection of signatures of visiting dignitaries. The signature collection, which numbers more than 1,300, dates back to the 1890s. Originally, dignitaries signed their names on the wooden walls of the Press Club. When that facility was vacated, club members sneaked in and cut out the signatures. Since then, dignitaries have signed their names on mat board. The entire collection was donated to the Urban Archives of the University of Wisconsin–Milwaukee in 2000. The signatures currently on display at the Newsroom Pub are on loan from UW–Milwaukee. The club continues to collect signatures of visiting dignitaries and renowned journalists. The signatures of numerous U.S. presidents - many left-handed - are presented along with other world leaders, such as Lech Walesa and former Mexican President Vicente Fox.

== Historic Site in Journalism ==
In 2006, the Society of Professional Journalists designated the Milwaukee Press Club a national Historic Site in Journalism.
