= Patent insides =

Preprinted newspaper pages sold to newspaper publishers

Patent insides were preprinted newspaper pages sold to newspaper publishers to provide them with content at a nominal cost, about what the publisher would have to pay for blank paper alone.

== History ==
Generic advertising of medical nostrums and other products typical of that appearing on a preprinted "patent inside" sheet. From Ashtabula Weekly Telegraph Sept. 10, 1880, pg. 7.

In 1863, Andrew J. Aikens devised an idea improving upon an older British idea of preprinting multiple local editions of newspapers, using common plates for most of the internal content. Aikens' idea was to print one side of a sheet with news and advertising and to provide these sheets at little or no cost to publishers of weekly newspapers, covering costs and generating profit from the advertising sold. Local publishers would be free to print on the other side of the page as they wished — thereby obtaining syndicated content without charge as well as free or very low cost newsprint. These preprinted sheets were commonly known as "patent insides," probably due to the preponderance of patent medicine advertising which they contained. The earliest use of this precise phrase found using the Newspapers.com search engine dates to January 1868.

In 1868, Aikens was rewarded with a partnership in the publishing company which produced The Daily Wisconsin, which was henceforth known as Cramer, Aikens, & Cramer. Shortly thereafter the name of the publication was changed to The Evening Wisconsin, a title which it retained into the 20th Century.

Cramer, Aikens, & Cramer soon generated a lucrative business around its "patent insides," with Aikens creating what he called "Newspaper Unions," making use of preprints that he created at dedicated printing facilities in New York, Chicago, Cincinnati, Atlanta, Nashville, and Memphis. Profits generated from this specialized operation helped to subsidize losses incurred by The Evening Wisconsin during economic lean times, helping to ensure the paper's survival.

Aikens' patent insides and ones produced by rivals rose in popularity in the 19th century. The trade journal Printers' Ink estimated in 1894 that more than 7,000 weekly newspapers in the United States relied on patent insides produced by five companies. The largest of these, George Josyln's Western Newspaper Union, supplied more than 14,000 clients in the mid-1920s, but shipped its last order in 1952.
