= Mark Mitchell (Vermont politician) =

American architect and politician (1934–2011)

Mark Mitchell (May 16, 1934 – October 26, 2011) was an American architect and politician.

== Early life ==
Born in London, England, Mitchell moved with his family to Ireland during World War II and then to the United States after the war. In 1956, Mitchell graduated from Dartmouth College with a BA in the History of Art. He then served in the United States Army. Mitchell received his degree in architecture from Harvard Graduate School of Design in 1962.

== Career ==
Michell practiced architecture in Boston and Cambridge, Massachusetts. Mitchell moved to Barnard, Vermont and continued to practice architecture. From 2007 until his resignation in 2011, Mitchell served in the Vermont House of Representatives and was a Democrat. In 2011, Mitchell resigned from the Vermont General Assembly because of lung cancer.

== Personal life ==
Mitchell died in Barnard, Vermont from lung cancer in 2011.
