= Amanda L. Aikens =

American editor and philanthropist (1833–1892)

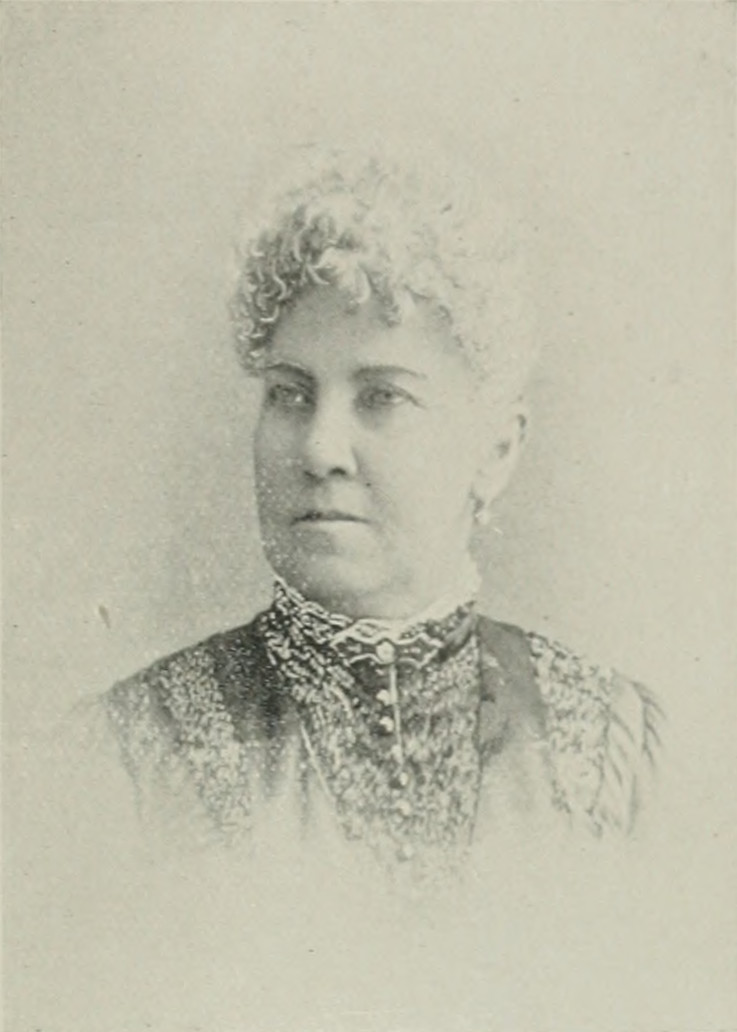
- Photo in A Woman of the Century
- Born: Amanda Lovina Barnes; May 12, 1833; North Adams, Massachusetts, U.S.
- Died: May 20, 1892 (aged 59); Milwaukee, Wisconsin, U.S.
- Occupations: newspaper editor; philanthropist
- Spouse: Andrew Jackson Aikens (m. 1854)
- Children: 3 surviving daughters
- Writing career
- Notable work: "Woman's World"

Amanda L. Aikens (née, Barnes; May 12, 1833 – May 20, 1892) was an American editor and philanthropist. During the American Civil War, she was one of the noted women workers, and it was through her public appeals that the question of the national soldiers' homes was agitated. She raised money in Wisconsin for the Johns Hopkins School of Medicine in Baltimore for the purpose of having women admitted on equal terms with men. She took an active interest in all charity and educational work in her state. Aikens was instrumental in founding the Wisconsin Industrial School for Girls, and was a member of the Humane Society, the Woman's Club, and the Athenaeum. In 1887, she began to edit the "Woman's World" section in the Evening Wisconsin.

== Early life and education ==
Amanda Lovina Barnes was born in North Adams, Massachusetts, May 12, 1833. Her father was Asahel Richardson Barnes. Her mother's maiden name was Mary Whitcomb Slocum. Aikens was reared under deeply religious influences.

Much of her education was received in Maplewood Institute, Pittsfield, Massachusetts.

== Career ==
She married Andrew Jackson Aikens, January 4, 1854. They lived in Milwaukee, Wisconsin, where for many years, she was a leader in local charities, church work and efforts for the intellectual development of women. They had four children, including Mary Lydia Aikens, and Stella Cramer, a poet.

In November 1887, Aikens began to edit "The Woman's World", a special department of The Evening Wisconsin, of which her husband was one of the proprietors, published in Milwaukee. Up to that time, she was best known for her active interest in, and intimate connection with, numerous benevolent societies. She was at one time president of the Board of Local Charities and Corrections, two years president of the Woman's Club of Milwaukee, two years chairman of the Art Committee, and served as vice-president of the Wisconsin Industrial School for Girls, and for ten years the chairman of its executive committee.

During the American Civil War, she made public appeals and announcements through the press when the question of a National Soldiers' Home was agitated. In the History of Milwaukee, published in 1881, there is a long account of her work helping the injured during the Civil War.

Aikens traveled extensively in Europe, and published newspaper letters of art criticism. She raised money in Wisconsin for the Johns Hopkins Medical School in Baltimore, for the purpose of admitting women on equal terms with men. She helped to organize the first Woman's Republican Club of Wisconsin, and was a State delegate to the National Conference of Charities when it met in Baltimore. In 1891, she read a paper before the State Conference of Charities in Madison, Wisconsin.

Aikens had much to do with the introduction of cooking into the public schools of Milwaukee. For 15 years, she was an officer or director with the Art Science Class, a literary organization with a purpose of developing a taste in architecture, painting, sculpture, and science. One-hundred and fifty women belonged to this class.

== Death ==
Aikens contracted influenza in January 1892, but although sick in bed, she continued to conduct the editorial department until three weeks before her death. She died at her home in Milwaukee, on May 20, 1892, after the long illness.
