= Andrew J. Aikens =

American newspaper publisher and editor

- Andrew J. Aikens in his later years
- Born: Andrew Jackson Aikens; October 31, 1828; Barnard, Vermont, US
- Died: January 22, 1909 (aged 80); Milwaukee, Wisconsin, US
- Occupation: Newspaper publisher
- Employer: The Evening Wisconsin
- Known for: Preprinted sheets for weekly newspapers called "patent insides"

Andrew Jackson Aikens, Sr. (October 31, 1828 – January 22, 1909) was an American newspaper publisher and editor who was associated for more than half a century with The Evening Wisconsin, a daily newspaper published in the city of Milwaukee.

Aikens is regarded as the creator of the "patent inside" preprinted sheet in 1863 — an early form of syndicated news and advertising content which helped to make the production of small weekly newspapers economically viable. At the time of his death it was estimated that some 10,000 newspapers — half of the weeklies in the United States — made use of some form of the preprinted page pioneered by Aikens.

== Early years ==
Andrew Jackson Aikens, Sr. was born October 31, 1828, in Barnard, Vermont. He was the son of ethnic Scots, with American ancestors on his father's side dating back to colonists arriving in Massachusetts Bay Colony in 1660 and his mother tracing family history back to the last surviving member of the Mayflower.

Aikens attended school until the age of 15, when he was graduated from high school. Following graduation, Aikens become an apprentice in the office of a printing office and newspaper located in Woodstock, Vermont. Over his four-year apprenticeship, Aikens became skilled in the craft of offset printing and the business of journalism, being hired as editor of the Woodstock weekly upon completion of his apprenticeship.

He later moved on to other editorial positions for weekly newspapers located in the towns of Bennington, Vermont and North Adams, Massachusetts. Aikens was deeply interested in politics from a young age and in 1852 he was elected as a delegate to the National Convention of the abolitionist Free Soil Party, helping to nominate John P. Hale for the office of President of the United States at Pittsburgh. Aikens spoke throughout the New England region on Hales' behalf, marking the beginning of a lifetime of dedication to the principles of the anti-slavery and pro-unionist Republican Party.

After his stint as editor in North Adams, Aikens moved to the urban mecca of Boston to take a job as a reporter for the Massachusetts General Court. This position led it turn to what may have been more lucrative state work as a proofreader employed by the Massachusetts State Printing Office.

In 1853 Aikens relocated to New York City, the capital city of American journalism, to take a position with the New York Evening Post. Aikens was made a special correspondent for the Evening Post assigned to covering events in the Western states and he was set off on the road. He married for the first time in 1854, raising three surviving daughters with his wife, the former Amanda L. Barnes of Pittsfield, Massachusetts. He married a second time in 1893, raising a son born in 1896 to his wife, the former Catherine Vine-Crehore of Minneapolis.

== Milwaukee arrival ==
Aikens came to Milwaukee, Wisconsin in the spring of 1854 as the 26-year old correspondent of the New York Evening Post. Aikens instantly fell in love with the booming small Upper Midwestern town and decided to make a career as a journalist there, moving there permanently early that same summer. He quit the Evening Post not long after arriving to take a job as the first secretary of the Milwaukee Chamber of Commerce.

It was not long before Aikens made his return to journalism. Local publisher William E. Cramer was a politically connected young lawyer turned journalist from Waterford, New York, who had come west to Wisconsin to establish a partisan newspaper loyal to the Democratic Party, formerly headed by General Andrew Jackson. Despite his divergent political views, Cramer was quick to snap up the ex-President's namesake, Andrew Jackson Aikens, for his booming local publication, The Daily Wisconsin, which he had owned since June 1847. A lasting business relationship resulted, with Aikens promoted to business manager of the paper in 1857.

== "Patent insides" ==
Generic advertising of medical nostrums and other products typical of that appearing on a preprinted "patent inside" sheet

During the Civil War year of 1863, Aikens devised an idea improving upon an older English idea of preprinting multiple local editions of newspapers using common plates for most of the internal content. Aikens' idea was to print one side of a sheet with news and advertising and to provide these sheets at little or no cost to publishers of weekly newspapers, covering costs and generating profit from the advertising sold. Local publishers were free to print on the other side of the page as they wished — thereby obtaining syndicated content without charge as well as free or very low cost newsprint. These preprinted sheets were commonly known as "patent insides," probably due to the preponderance of patent medicine advertising which they contained.

In 1868, Aikens was rewarded with a partnership in the publishing company which produced The Daily Wisconsin, which was henceforth known as Cramer, Aikens, & Cramer. Shortly thereafter the name of the publication was changed to The Evening Wisconsin, a title which it retained into the 20th century.

Cramer, Aikens, & Cramer soon generated a lucrative business around its "patent insides," with Aikens creating what he called "Newspaper Unions" making use of preprints that he created at dedicated printing facilities in New York, Chicago, Cincinnati, Atlanta, Nashville, and Memphis. Profits generated from this specialized operation helped subsidize losses incurred by The Evening Wisconsin during economic lean times, helping to ensure the paper's survival.

Aikens was widely read and well-traveled, spending extended time in Europe during a pair of trips made in 1877 and 1878, and accumulating a vast personal library. He was for many years an officer of the Associated Press, as well as a charter member of the Milwaukee Club, and head of the Milwaukee association of employing printers.

== Death and legacy ==
Andrew J. Aikens died on January 22, 1909, in Milwaukee, just ten days after having suffered a paralyzing stroke. He was 80 years old at the time of his death.

At the time of his death it was reckoned that as many as 10,000 American newspapers – about half of the weekly papers in the country – used some form of the "patent insides" system of preprinted sheets that Aikens had developed, saving these local publishers millions of dollars in production costs. The rise of high-speed web-fed offset presses in the early 20th century soon made the production of preprinted sheets uneconomical, however.

Aikens survived William E. Cramer, the senior partner of Cramer, Aikens, & Cramer, by four years, with Cramer's widow, Harriet L. Cramer, having been elected president of the company upon her husband's death. In June 1918, nearly a decade after Aikens' death, The Evening Wisconsin was sold to a former owner of the Milwaukee Daily News, who sold it in turn before the end of the year to Arthur Brisbane, prominent in the Hearst newspapers chain. The publication was consolidated into the Daily News and the Milwaukee Daily Press by Brisbane at the end of 1918.
