= Lincoln Covered Bridge =

- U.S. National Register of Historic Places
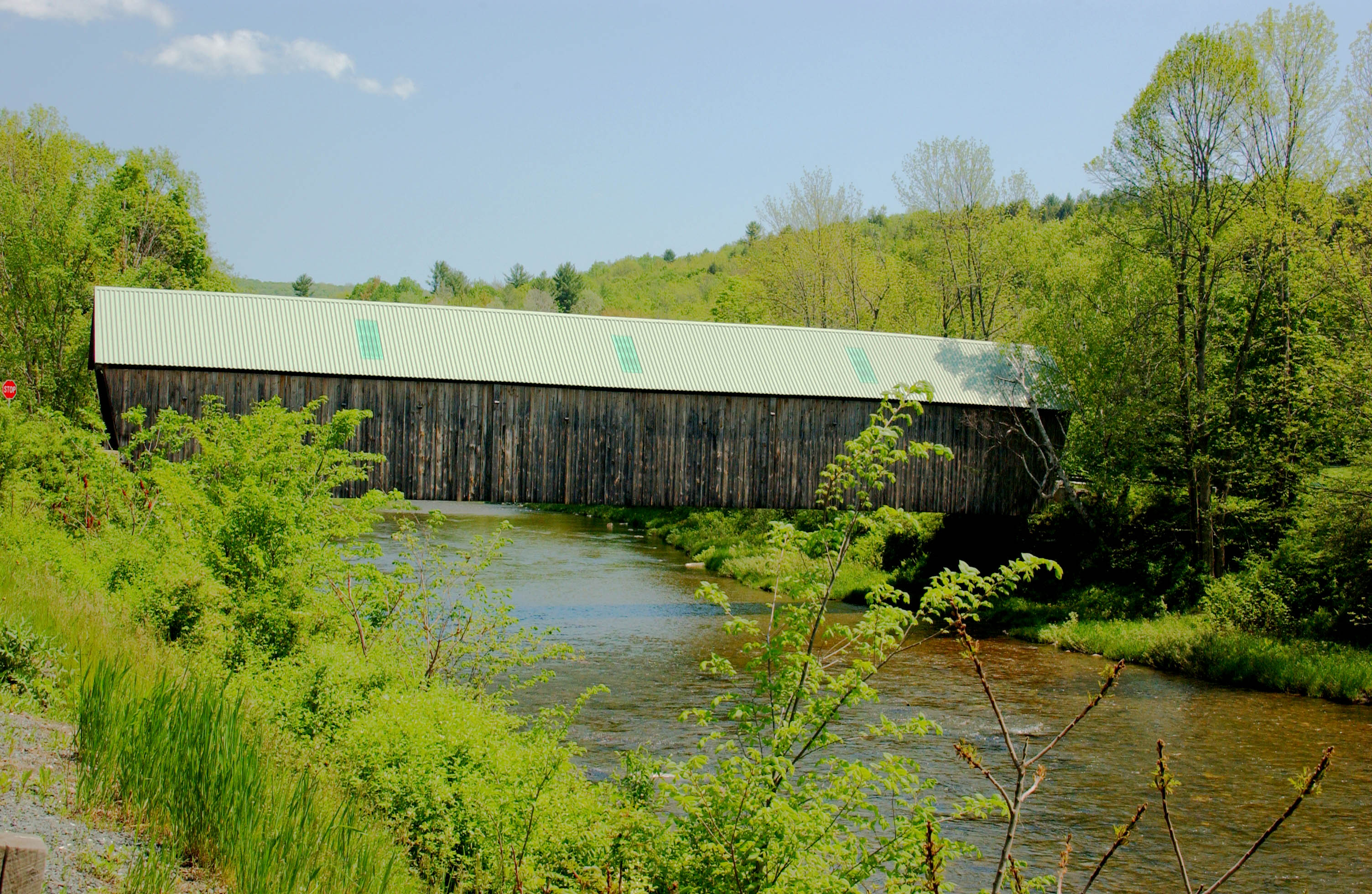

- Location within Vermont
- Nearest city: Woodstock, Vermont
- Coordinates: 43°36′2″N 72°34′10″W
- Area: 1 acre (0.40 ha)
- Built: 1877
- Built by: Pinney, R. W.; Pinney, B. H.
- Architectural style: Pratt truss system
- NRHP reference No.: 73000212
- Added to NRHP: August 28, 1973

The Lincoln Covered Bridge is a historic covered bridge, just south of U.S. Route 4 in West Woodstock, Vermont. Built in 1877, it is one of the only known examples of a wooden Pratt truss bridge in the United States. It was listed on the National Register of Historic Places in 1973.

== Description and history ==
The Lincoln Covered Bridge spans the Ottauquechee River, a short way west of the village of West Woodstock. It is just south of US 4, connecting that road to Bridges Road and Fletcher Hill Road on the south side of the river. It is a single span, 136 feet (41 m) in length, resting on concrete and stone abutments, and is 18.5 feet (5.6 m) wide with a roadway width of 14 feet (4.3 m) (one lane). The bridge is supported by two arch trusses, which are sheltered by a post-and-beam structure finished with a metal standing seam roof and vertical board siding. The trusses are a variant of the Pratt truss, with laminated arches supporting the deck by a combination of wooden and iron verticals, with iron cross bracing. In 1989, the bridge was rehabilitated and strengthened by the Vermont Agency of Transportation. The purpose of the project was to restore the structure to its original condition and increase its load-carrying capacity to safely carry emergency vehicles. Restoration focused primarily on rebuilding the ends of the top and bottom chords of the trusses that had deteriorated over the previous century. All of the restoration work was performed using materials and details as close to the original as possible. The increase in strength was accomplished by post-tensioning the two trusses below the bottom wooden chords with high-strength coated steel rods. These rods, as well as other structural steel upgrades required to increase the strength are hidden from view by the wooden siding to maintain the historic look of the bridge. The two Pratt trusses are still the fully functioning main structural supports for the bridge. In addition, skylights were added to the metal roof to allow natural light into the structure due to its long span. These skylights are made from translucent corrugated (to match the contour of the existing roofing)polyvinyl material. Existing braided steel cables anchoring the upstream ends of the bridge to the shore were also removed at this time. The cables were previously installed to protect the bridge from washing away in a flood or ice flow. However, this method proved to cause the destruction of these covered wooden bridges at other locations in the country during one of these events. It was determined at the time that letting the structure move and float with the flowing water/ice would cause the least amount of damage. After one of these events, the structure could then be reset with heavy equipment and/or cranes, repaired, and put back in service in a much shorter timespan and significantly lower cost.

The bridge was built in 1877 by R.W. Pinney and B.H. Pinney (of Bridgewater and Woodstock, respectively), about thirty years after the Pratt truss was patented. According to covered bridge history Richard S. Allen, it is the only known surviving use of the Pratt truss in wood; this form is seen much more widely in metal bridges built later.

== See also ==
- National Register of Historic Places listings in Windsor County, Vermont
- List of Vermont covered bridges
- List of bridges on the National Register of Historic Places in Vermont
