= National Blue Ribbon Schools Program =

School excellence award in the United States

- Type: Education award program
- Awarded for: Exemplary school performance and achievement gap reduction
- Description: Annual recognition of exemplary public and non-public schools in the United States
- Sponsored by: United States Department of Education
- Country: United States
- Eligibility: Public and non-public schools in operation for at least five years
- Formerly called: National Blue Ribbon Schools Award
- Status: Discontinued
- Established: 1982
- Final award: 2025

Highlights
- Total: More than 10,000 awards
- Total recipients: More than 9,000 schools
- Website: https://nationalblueribbonschools.ed.gov/

The National Blue Ribbon Schools Program was a United States Department of Education (DoEd) award program that recognized exemplary public and non-public schools on a yearly basis. Using standards of excellence evidenced by student achievement measures, the Department honored high-performing schools and schools that were making great strides in closing any achievement gaps between students. The program was supported through ongoing collaboration with the National Association of Elementary School Principals, Association for Middle Level Education, and the National Association of Secondary School Principals.

The program was founded in 1982 under the presidency of Ronald Reagan and the award has been presented to more than 9,000 schools. The program represented the full diversity of American schools: public schools including Title I schools, charter schools, magnet schools, and non-public schools including parochial and independent schools. The schools are urban, suburban, and rural, large and small, traditional and innovative, and serve students of every social, economic, and ethnic background.

The program was discontinued by President Donald Trump on August 29, 2025. A spokesperson from the Department of Education wrote that this decision was made "in the spirit of Returning Education to the States."

== History ==
In 1982, then-Secretary of Education Terrel H. Bell, best known for commissioning A Nation at Risk, described a "rising tide" of mediocre schools that threatened the nation's future.

Secretary Bell created the National Blue Ribbon Schools Award to bring exceptional U.S. schools to public attention and to recognize those schools whose students thrived and excelled. Working with the National Association of Elementary School Principals and the National Association of Secondary School Principals, Bell launched the National Blue Ribbon Schools and the National Distinguished Principals Programs. Both programs highlighted outstanding models of American schools and school leadership.

Initially, the National Blue Ribbon Schools program honored only secondary schools; it was later expanded to include primary schools. It was changed again to honor secondary schools and primary schools in alternate years and honors secondary, middle, elementary, and K–8 and K–12 schools each year. In 2003, the program was restructured to bring it in line with the No Child Left Behind Education Law, placing a stronger emphasis on state assessment data and requiring schools to demonstrate high academic success. Schools must show how data are interpreted and used and how curriculum, instruction, professional development, and student support promote student success. In 2012, the program was renamed the National Blue Ribbon Schools program to distinguish it from a for-profit company which had appropriated the Blue Ribbon School name.

During its first 25 years of existence, the National Blue Ribbon Schools Award was granted approximately 5,600 times, recognizing 5,200 different schools. (Some schools have been selected two or more times.) More than 133,000 public, charter, private and parochial schools serving grades K–12 are eligible for the award. More than 9,000 schools have been honored as National Blue Ribbon Schools—with more than 10,000 awards given in total—since the program's inception.

States, territories, the Bureau of Indian Affairs, and the Department of Defense Education Activity schools have joined the competition over the years. Special emphasis has changed from year to year based on national priorities. Among National Blue Ribbon Schools there is much diversity: the award recognizes rural, urban, and suburban schools; large and small schools, and public and non-public schools.

== Criteria ==
The National Blue Ribbon Schools Program accepts nominations from both public and non-public schools that meet one of two criteria:

- Exemplary High Performing Schools are among their state's highest performing schools as measured by state assessments or nationally normed tests.
- Exemplary Achievement Gap-Closing Schools are among their state's highest-performing schools in closing achievement gaps between a school's subgroups and all students over the past 5 years.

Eligible schools must have been in existence for five years and cannot have received the award within the five prior years.

Must have excellence in the fields of academics, arts, and athletics.

== Application procedure ==
Although at one time schools self-nominated for the award, this is no longer the case. At the invitation of the U.S. Secretary of Education, Chief State School Officers, including Washington, D.C., the Department of Defense Education Activity, the Bureau of Indian Education, and the Council for American Private Education nominate eligible schools for the annual award. Eligible schools must demonstrate high or strongly improving student scores on state or nationally normed assessments in the last year tested; schools must also make Annual Yearly Progress in accordance with No Child Left Behind.

Nominated schools submit applications describing school operations such as the use of assessments and assessment data, instructional methods, curricula, professional development, leadership, and community and family involvement. A total of 420 schools may be nominated in any year; state quotas are determined by the number of students and schools.

The Blue Ribbon award is considered the highest honor an American school can achieve. A school's use of the National Blue Ribbon Schools logo is restricted.

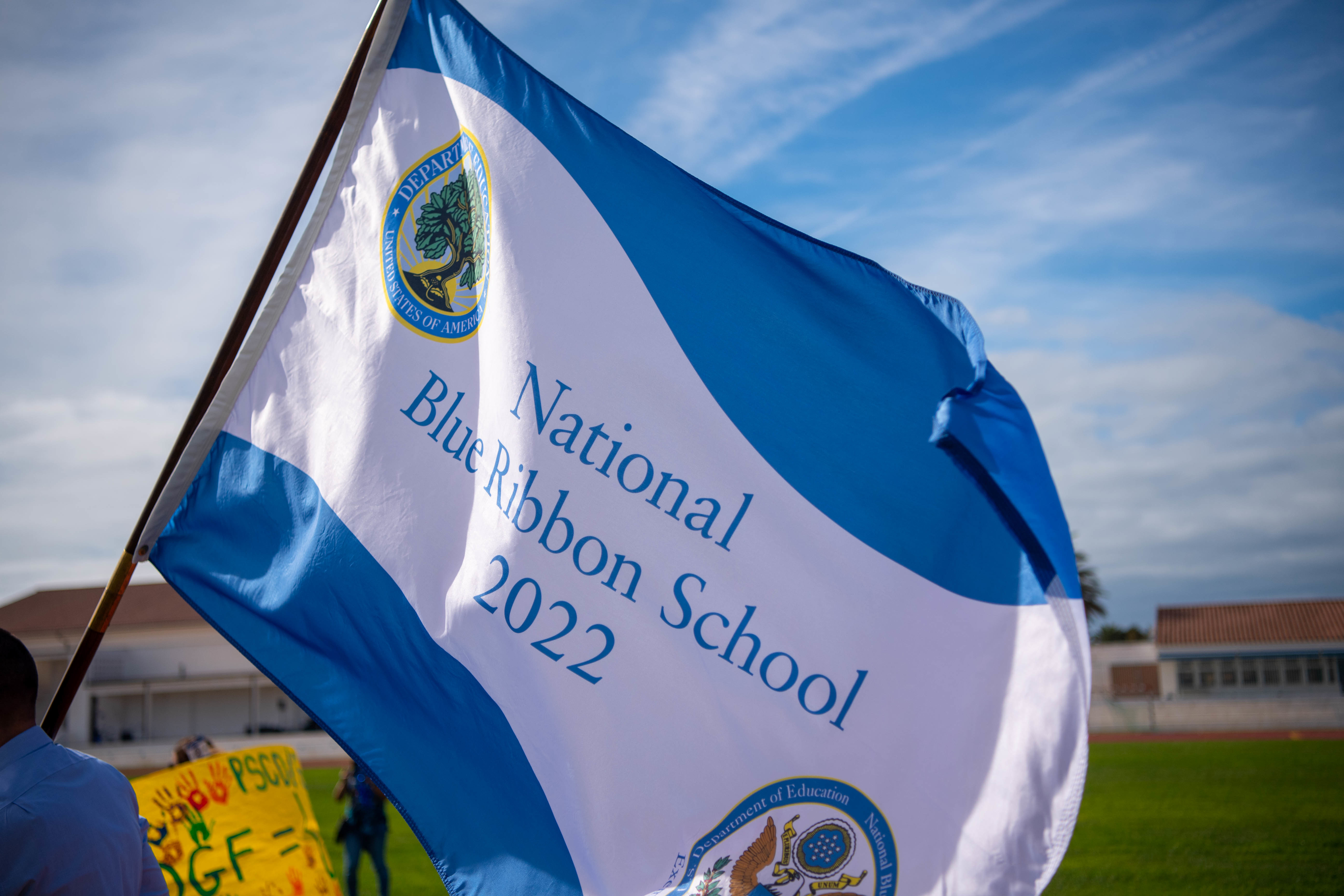
National Blue Ribbon School 2022 flag.

== Criticism ==
David W. Kirkpatrick, the Senior Education Fellow at the US Freedom Foundation, noted in an editorial titled, "Awarding Blue Ribbons: Recognizing Schools or Students?" that criteria for the awards do not take into account the socioeconomic status of the students and that studies show that students who come from homes with higher income and better educated parents do better than students without these advantages by virtue of their backgrounds. Thus, the award is usually given to schools with students from wealthy backgrounds. As evidence to support his case, he pointed to the distribution of awards given in Pennsylvania one year; of the eight schools receiving the award, only one was in a district whose income level was near the state average, and the rest went to districts with an above average income, including two in the wealthiest communities in the state. While Kirkpatrick proposed an alternative to recognizing "blue ribbon students", he wrote, "a more accurate indication of a good school would be one that adjusts for such socioeconomic factors and identifies those in which students do better than would normally be expected, based on their backgrounds."

From the program's inception through 2003, schools were permitted to nominate themselves. As of 2003, nominations are handled through a state liaison which schools must contact for nomination.

The program has also been criticized for assessment of schools coming from the school itself rather than an independent third party and a nomination and assessment process that favors schools with the know-how and resources to complete the review assessment.
