= Aiken Stand Complex =

Historic house in Vermont, United States

- U.S. National Register of Historic Places
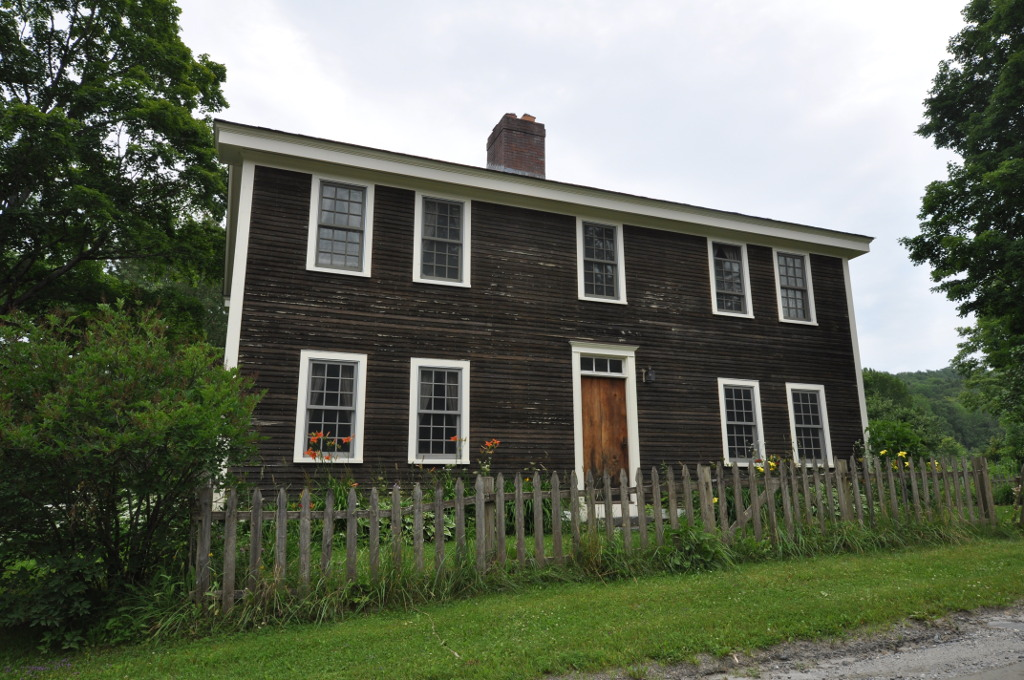
- Tavern House

- Location within Vermont Location within the United States
- Location: Royalton Tpk. at Sayer Rd., Barnard, Vermont
- Coordinates: 43°43′57″N 72°35′26″W
- Area: 3 acres (1.2 ha)
- Built: 1805
- Architectural style: Federal, Cape/Classic Cottage
- NRHP reference No.: 83003229
- Added to NRHP: January 27, 1983

The Aiken Stand Complex is a historic pair of buildings at the junction of Royalton Turnpike and Sayer Road in rural Barnard, Vermont. Built c. 1805 and 1835, they were the centerpiece of a small village that flourished in the first half of the 19th century, when the Turnpike was the principal north–south route through the region. The buildings were listed on the National Register of Historic Places in 1983.

== Description and history ==
The Aiken Stand Complex stands in what is now a comparatively remote and rural area of eastern Barnard. At the southeast corner of Royalton Turnpike and Sayer Road stands the main building, a 2 1/2-story wood-frame structure, with a side gable roof, large central chimney, clapboarded exterior, five-bay front facade, and rubblestone foundation. Its interior and exterior are predominantly Federal in their style. Across the turnpike to the west stands a 1 1/2-story Cape style structure, with a similar exterior, but with Greek Revival features, including sidelight windows flanking the entrance.

The location was the site of a tavern from at least 1781, when Solomon Aiken was documented to be operating one. His business benefited from the establishment of the Woodstock and Royalton Turnpike, a toll road, in 1800, and he built the main tavern building about 1805 to handle increased business. The Cape was added in 1835 to handle overflow traffic and provide more space for the Aiken family. Notable visitors to the tavern included President James Madison in 1817, and the Marquis de Lafayette in 1824. At its height, the tavern was the center of a small village, with a blacksmith's shop and school. The turnpike declined in importance after the construction of railroads in the state, and the tavern ended as a business in the 1870s. The buildings were used as private residences until the mid-20th century, and were then abandoned. They underwent restoration in the early 1980s.

== See also ==
- National Register of Historic Places listings in Windsor County, Vermont
