= Collegiate Middle Level Association =

The Collegiate Middle Level Association (CMLA) is a student association designed to promote and support the professional development of future middle level teachers, as well as the development and nurturing of middle level education programs. CMLA is an affiliate of National Middle School Association.

As of 2025, Dr. Sarah Pennington and Dr. Kristie Smith serve as the faculty advisors.

== History ==
The Collegiate Middle Level Association currently has 31 chapters. These 31 chapters represent a growing number of colleges and universities who are now preparing teachers to teach in American middle schools.

In 1988, a group of college students at the University of Northern Colorado tried to create a national organization for students preparing to become middle school teachers. At that time there were only 18 states that had middle school certification or endorsement as opposed to 46 states today and middle school teacher education programs were the exception rather than the rule. In the early 1990s, there were only four higher education institutions that had active middle school student groups, University of Northern Colorado, University of Northern Iowa, Illinois State University, and Appalachian State University.

In 1989, under the leadership of Ned Gilardino, a UNC student, a constitution was drafted and the Student Association for Middle Education (SAME) was born. Its name was later changed to Collegiate Middle Level Association (CMLA). That same year, CMLA made a presentation to the NMSA Board of Trustees. The Board recognized CLMA and agreed to help finance them by sharing a percentage of the membership fee of all college students who joined NMSA and had an interest in also becoming a member of CMLA.

Then, in 1995, the NMSA recognized CMLA as an official affiliate member, joining other state middle school associations. In the same year, CMLA moved from an individual membership to a chapter membership. An advisory board was established consisting of the chapter advisors of all the member chapters. The officers were now elected from one campus that applied and was approved by the advisory board to be the host site for a two-year term. Financing was more closely aligned with NMSA. The association was able to have two annual meetings rather than just meeting at the NMSA annual conference.

At first CMLA grew slowly under this newly revised structure. However, as more states legislated middle school teacher licensure and more colleges and universities began to develop middle school teacher education programs, CMLA provided an ever increasing number of prospective middle school teachers the opportunity to become professionally involved as middle level educators.

The following colleges and universities have been leadership host sites for CMLA since the new restructuring: Otterbein College (2009–Present); Georgia College & State University (2007-2009); University of Dayton (2005-2007); Ashland University (2003-2005); Appalachian State University (2001-2003); Central Michigan University (1999-2001); Missouri Southern State University (1997-1999); and Illinois State University (1995-1997).

== Current Chapters ==
- Appalachian State University
- Arkansas Tech University
- Armstrong Atlantic State University
- Ashland University
- Baylor University
- Bethany College
- Bowling Green State University
- Central Michigan University
- Clayton State University
- Cleveland State University
- College of Charleston
- Dillard University
- East Carolina University
- Eastern Kentucky University
- Georgia College & State University
- Georgia Regents University
- Heidelberg College
- Hiram College
- Humboldt State University
- Illinois State University
- Lee University
- Lewis University
- Missouri Southern State University
- Morehead State University
- Murray State University
- North Georgia College and State University
- Northern Kentucky University
- Otterbein College (National Host Site)
- Portland State University
- Rhode Island College
- Southern Illinois University
- Southwest Baptist University
- Southwest Missouri State University
- Texas A&M University
- University of Arkansas
- University of Central Arkansas
- University of North Carolina
- University of Rio Grande
- University of Texas
- University of Cincinnati
- University of Dayton
- University of Maine
- Youngstown State University
