= Preservation Trust of Vermont =

The Preservation Trust of Vermont, founded in 1980, is a nonprofit, charitable, organization designed to preserve and protect the architectural heritage of the U.S. state of Vermont. The Trust provides assistance to individuals, groups, and other organizations, involved in the historic preservation of Vermont's built environment. The Trust also provides educational programs, accepts gifts of property, and holds easements on properties.

The organization is funded by individual contributions, businesses, and foundations, enabling the trust to offer aid in the forms of grants, and professional support. The Trust partners with local communities, organizations, and individual Vermonters actively working to protect and restore historic properties, and promote the revitalization and responsible development of city, towns, and village centers. The Trust works cooperatively with the Vermont Division for Historic Preservation, a Vermont state agency, and the National Trust for Historic Preservation.
