= Silver Lake State Park (Vermont) =

State park in Windsor County, Vermont

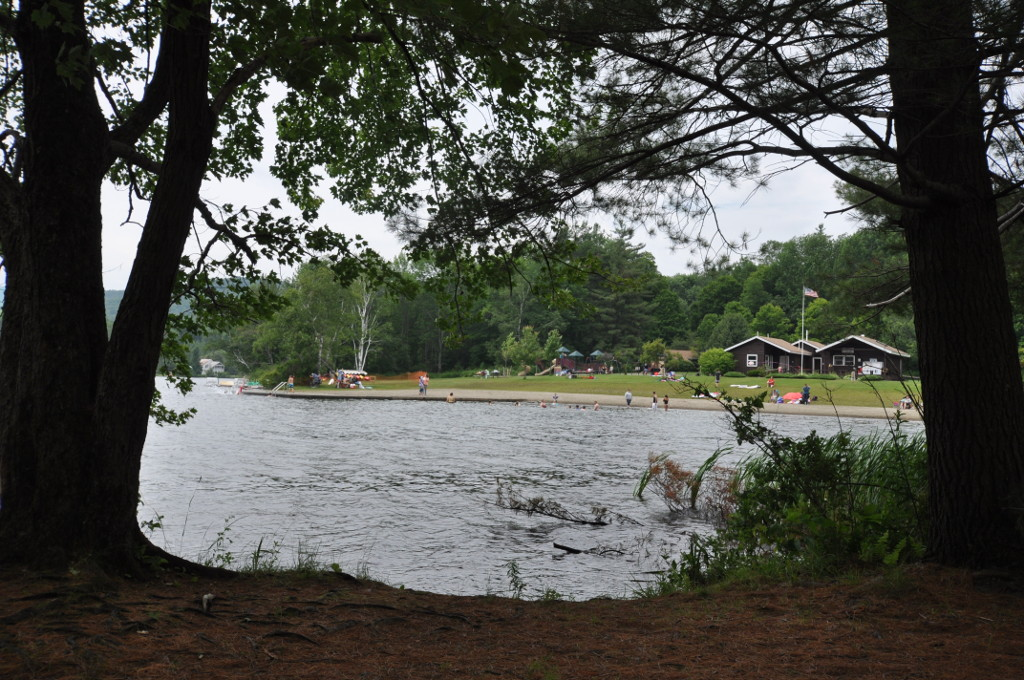
- View of swimming area
- Interactive map of Silver Lake State Park
- Type: State park
- Location: 20 State Park Beach Rd. Barnard, Vermont
- Coordinates: 43.73221°N 72.61671°W
- Area: 35 acres (14 ha)
- Created: 1955
- Operator: Vermont Department of Forests, Parks, and Recreation
- Status: Open May 25 to September 7
- Website: Official website

Silver Lake State Park is a 35-acre (14 ha) state park in Barnard, Vermont. It is located on the northern shore of the 84-acre Silver Lake and offers swimming, picnic areas, and camping. Other activities include fishing, paddling, and winter sports.

The park was managed in 1955 and is administered by the Vermont Department of Forests, Parks, and Recreation as part of the Vermont State Park system.
