= Barnard, Vermont =

- Town
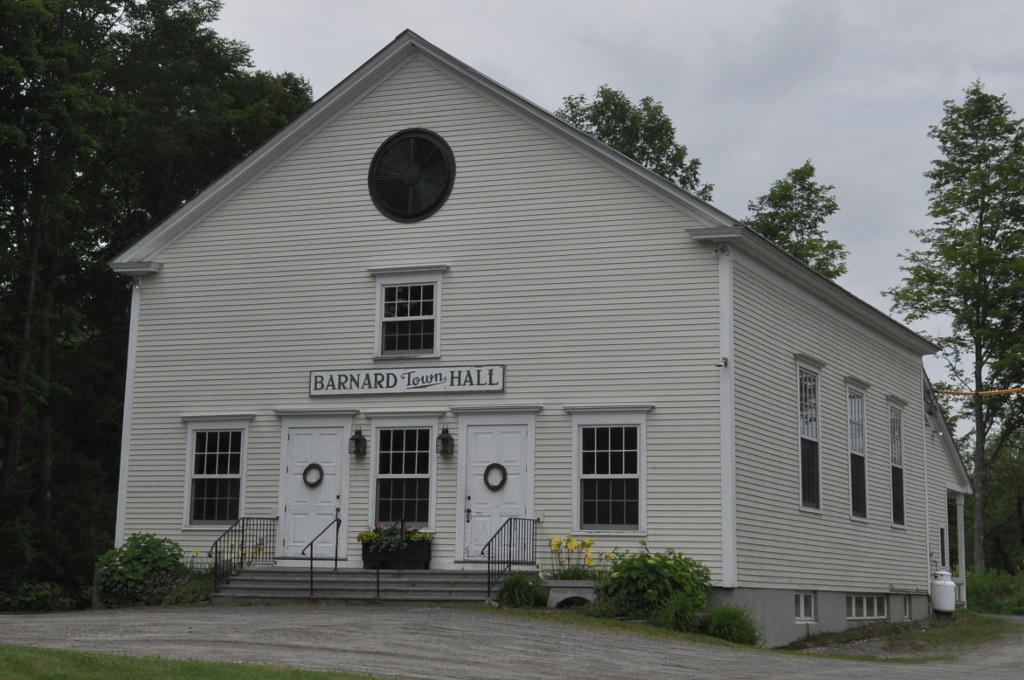
- Barnard Town Hall

- Seal

- Location in Windsor County and the state of Vermont
- Interactive map of Barnard, Vermont
- Coordinates: 43°45′15″N 72°37′30″W
- Country: United States
- State: Vermont
- County: Windsor
- Communities: Barnard; East Barnard

Area
  - Total: 48.9 sq mi (126.6 km^{2})
  - Land: 48.7 sq mi (126.1 km^{2})
  - Water: 0.19 sq mi (0.5 km^{2})
- Elevation: 1,348 ft (411 m)

Population (2020)
  - Total: 992
  - Density: 20.4/sq mi (7.87/km^{2})
- Time zone: UTC−5 (Eastern (EST))
  - Summer (DST): UTC−4 (EDT)
- ZIP Codes: 05031 (Barnard); 05032 (Bethel); 05067 (South Pomfret); 05068 (South Royalton); 05091 (Woodstock)
- Area code: 802
- FIPS code: 50-02725
- GNIS feature ID: 1462033
- Website: barnardvt.us

Barnard /ˈbɑːrnərd/ is a town in Windsor County, Vermont, United States. The population was 992 at the 2020 census.

The town has two unincorporated villages: Barnard and East Barnard, along with the hamlets of Newcombsville, Mountain Meadows, and Fort Defiance.

== History ==
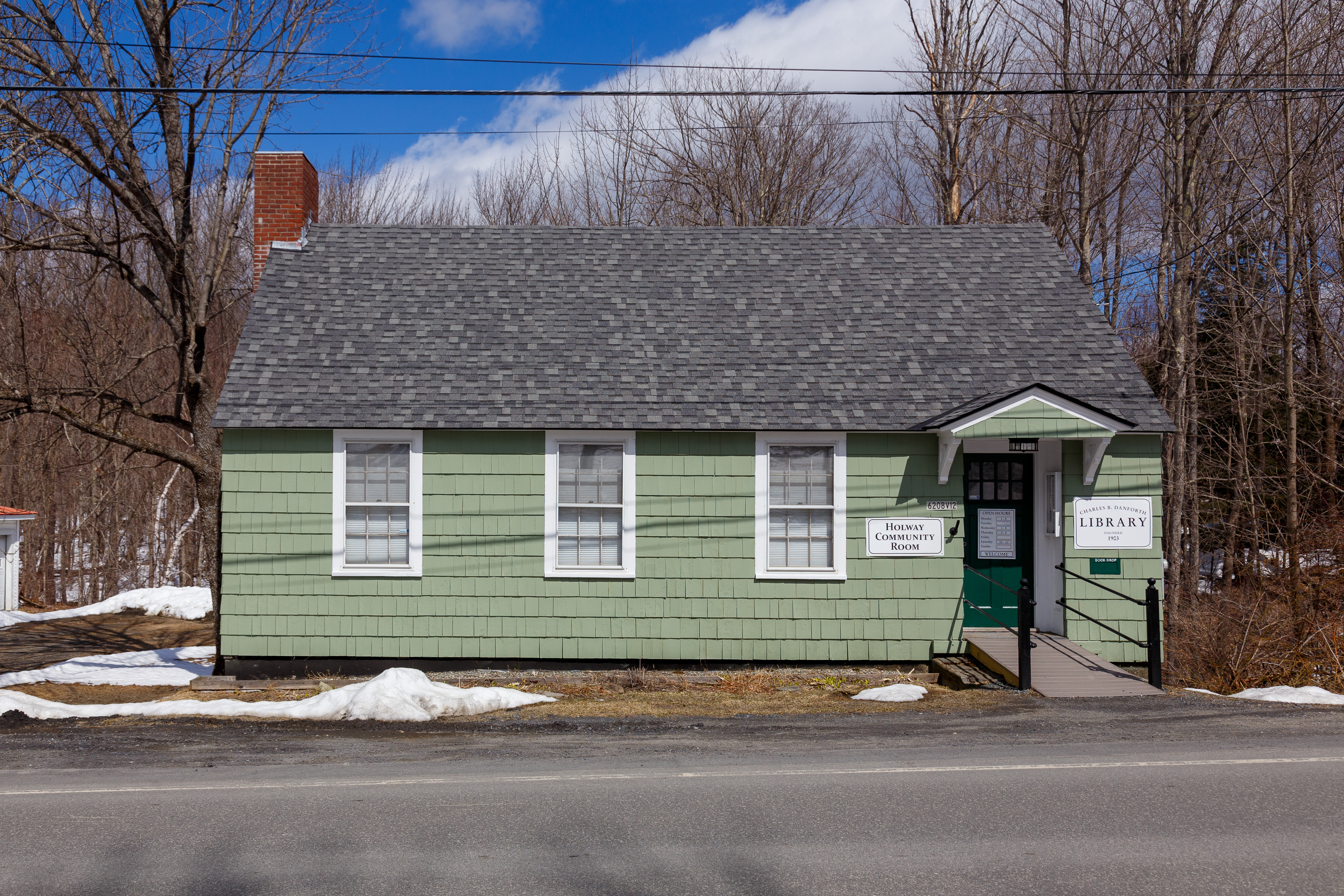
Charles Danforth Library and Holway Community Room

The town was chartered on July 17, 1761, by a New Hampshire Grant. It was named "Bernard" after one of the five grantees of the town, Sir Francis Bernard, 1st Baronet, who was governor of the Province of Massachusetts Bay from 1760 to 1769. The town's name was changed to Barnard some time before 1810.

Universalist minister Hosea Ballou was at the local church from 1801 to 1807.

In 1928, Nobel Prize–winning novelist Sinclair Lewis bought Connett Place with a total 300 acres (1.2 km^{2}) and adjacent Chase Farm. He named the property Twin Farms and used it as a vacation house during the 1930s and 1940s with his wife Dorothy Thompson.

In 1941, German playwright Carl Zuckmayer, a refugee from Nazi Germany whom Dorothy Thompson had helped to get into the US, rented Backwoods Farm, with its farmhouse from 1783 nowadays owned by Hannah Kahn and a total 180 acres (0.73 km^{2}), from Joseph Ward (of Maynes & Ward hardware store on Main Street in Woodstock, Vermont) for 50 dollars a month. Zuckmayer worked this property as a farmer until 1946 and wrote the play Des Teufels General (The Devil's General) there. His autobiography A Part of Myself (1966) deals extensively with these years. Zuckmayer's wife Alice Herdan-Zuckmayer also wrote a memoir of their time in Barnard: The Farm in the Green Mountains (Die Farm in den grünen Bergen).

== Geography ==
According to the United States Census Bureau, the town has a total area of 48.9 sq mi (127 km^{2}), of which 48.7 are land and 0.2 is water.

== Demographics ==
Historical population
Census	Pop.	Note	%±
1790	673		—
1800	1,236		83.7%
1810	1,648		33.3%
1820	1,691		2.6%
1830	1,881		11.2%
1840	1,774		−5.7%
1850	1,647		−7.2%
1860	1,487		−9.7%
1870	1,208		−18.8%
1880	1,191		−1.4%
1890	918		−22.9%
1900	840		−8.5%
1910	737		−12.3%
1920	653		−11.4%
1930	584		−10.6%
1940	486		−16.8%
1950	439		−9.7%
1960	435		−0.9%
1970	569		30.8%
1980	790		38.8%
1990	872		10.4%
2000	958		9.9%
2010	947		−1.1%
2020	992		4.8%
U.S. Decennial Census

As of the census of 2000, there were 958 people, 383 households, and 276 families residing in the town. The population density was 19.7 people per square mile (7.6/km^{2}). There were 629 housing units at an average density of 12.9 per square mile (5.0/km^{2}). The racial makeup of the town was 98.43% White, 0.42% Hispanic or Latino, 0.31% Asian and 1.04% from two or more races.

There were 383 households, out of which 29.2% had children under the age of 18 living with them, 61.4% were married couples living together, 6.8% had a female householder with no husband present, and 27.7% were non-families. 21.1% of all households were made up of individuals, and 5.7% had someone living alone who was 65 years of age or older. The average household size was 2.50 and the average family size was 2.84.

In the town, the population was spread out, with 23.4% under the age of 18, 5.1% from 18 to 24, 26.4% from 25 to 44, 32.0% from 45 to 64, and 13.0% who were 65 years of age or older. The median age was 42 years. For every 100 females, there were 93.9 males. For every 100 females age 18 and over, there were 97.8 males.

The median income for a household in the town was $45,787, and the median income for a family was $48,125. Males had a median income of $29,485 versus $25,385 for females. The per capita income for the town was $25,354. About 4.7% of families and 6.3% of the population were below the poverty line, including 10.0% of those under age 18 and 2.4% of those age 65 or over.

== Silver Lake State Park ==
Silver Lake State Park, encompassing the northern shoreline of Silver Lake, was established in 1955 when some land with shore frontage was donated to the state by John McDill of Woodstock, Margaret Crosby of Barnard, and Richard H. Field of Boston. Silver Lake had originally been called Stebbings' Pond after Benjamin Stebbings who owned land at the outlet where the village now stands. Later the lake became known as Barnard Pond. In 1869, it was renamed Silver Lake.

== Education ==
Barnard Academy is a public elementary school located on Route 12. It has educational programs from pre-kindergarten through sixth grade. Barnard Academy is part of the Windsor Central Supervisory Union.

== Notable people ==
- Andrew J. Aikens, newspaper editor
- Asa Aikens, Justice of the Vermont Supreme Court
- Hosea Ballou, Universalist minister and author
- Edward Morris Bowman, organist, conductor, composer, and music educator
- Sinclair Lewis, Nobel Prize-winning novelist, short story writer, and playwright
- Mark Mitchell, architect and politician
- Louis Nathaniel de Rothschild Austrian Baron
- Susanne Hoeber Rudolph, American author, political thinker and educationist
- Lloyd I. Rudolph, American author, political thinker and educationist
- Dorothy Thompson, journalist
- Tulius Cicero Tupper, Major General of the Mississippi State Troops in the American Civil War.
- Carl Zuckmayer, German writer and playwright

== See also ==
- Aiken Stand Complex
- Barnard General Store
