= National Middle School Association =

Association for Middle Level Education

The National Middle School Association (NMSA) is the former name of the Association for Middle Level Education (AMLE), an international education association dedicated exclusively to the middle level grades.

With more than 30,000 members in the United States, Canada, and 46 other countries, AMLE represents principals, teachers, central office personnel, professors, college students, parents, community leaders, and educational consultants. In addition, AMLE's network includes 58 affiliates in the United States, Canada, Europe, and Australia that serve regional, state, provincial, and local needs.

AMLE provides professional development, journals, books, research, and other information to assist educators.

== Publications ==
- Middle School Journal
- Middle Ground
- Research in Middle Level Education Online (RMLE Online)
- Today's Middle Level Educator
- The Family Connection
