= West Woodstock, Vermont =

Census-designated place in Vermont, United States

- Census-designated place
- Location within Vermont Location within the United States
- Coordinates: 43°36′41″N 72°33′05″W
- Country: United States
- State: Vermont
- County: Windsor
- Town: West Woodstock

Area
  - Total: 0.89 sq mi (2.31 km^{2})
  - Land: 0.84 sq mi (2.17 km^{2})
  - Water: 0.054 sq mi (0.14 km^{2})
- Elevation: 745 ft (227 m)

Population (2020)
  - Total: 401
- Time zone: UTC-5 (Eastern (EST))
  - Summer (DST): UTC-4 (EDT)
- ZIP Code: 05091 (Woodstock)
- Area code: 802
- FIPS code: 50-83125
- GNIS feature ID: 2807171

West Woodstock is an unincorporated village and census-designated place (CDP) in the town of Woodstock, Windsor County, Vermont, United States. As of the 2020 census, it had a population of 401.

The CDP is in central Windsor County, at the geographic center of the town of Woodstock, in the valley of the Ottauquechee River, an east-flowing tributary of the Connecticut River. U.S. Route 4 is the main street through the community, leading northeast 1.5 miles (2.4 km) to the village of Woodstock and west 5 miles (8 km) to Bridgewater. White River Junction is 15 miles (24 km) to the east and Rutland is 29 miles (47 km) to the west via Route 4.

The West Woodstock Bridge, a historic steel bridge, carries Mill Road across the Ottauquechee River from the center of the village. The Lincoln Covered Bridge crosses the Ottauquechee at the western end of the CDP, connecting Route 4 with Bridges Road and Fletcher Hill road.
