= Association for Middle Level Education =

National Middle School Association

- Formation: 1973
- Type: Nonprofit
- Tax ID no.: 31-0865702
- Headquarters: 2550 Corporate Exchange Dr. Suite 324; Columbus, OH, 43231
- Region served: International
- Board Chair: Lisa Harrison
- Vice Chair: Erin Scholes
- Website: Official website
- Formerly called: National Middle School Association (NMSA)

The Association for Middle Level Education (AMLE), formerly the National Middle School Association (NMSA), is an international education association dedicated exclusively to the middle level grades. With more than 30,000 members in the United States, Canada, and 46 other countries, AMLE represents principals, teachers, central office personnel, professors, college students, parents, community leaders, and educational consultants.

== History ==
In 1973, the Association for Middle Level Education was founded as National Middle School Association. AMLE is the only international education association dedicated exclusively to those in the middle grades.

As of 2023, AMLE has more than 30,000 members across the United States, Canada, and 46 other countries and a network of 58 affiliate organizations in the United States, Canada, Europe, and Australia that serve regional, state, provincial, and local needs.

== Program ==
AMLE’s Schools of Distinction program recognizes middle grade schools that exceed certain educational criteria. The organization also provides guidance through a "strategic vision setting to help foster ongoing growth and success."

As of 2023, the program’s evaluation criteria were based on AMLE’s landmark position paper, The Successful Middle School: This We Believe, which identifies research-based practices for the middle grades.

AMLE provides professional development, journals, books, research, and other information to assist educators helping them to reach every student, grow professionally, and create great schools. As of August 2022, the organization’s chief executive officer is Stephanie Simpson.

== Publications ==
- The Successful Middle School: This We Believe
- Middle School Journal
- AMLE Magazine
- Research in Middle Level Education Online (RMLE Online)
- Research Summaries
