= VHT =

VHT may refer to:

- VHT TrackBite, former name of the PJ1 TrackBite resin used in drag racing
- Very high throughput, in the wireless networking standard IEEE 802.11ac-2013
- Vijay Hazare Trophy, a domestic cricket tournament held in India

== See also ==
- HT (disambiguation)
- Extremely High Throughput, in IEEE 802.11be
