= HTS =

HTS may refer to:

== Military ==
- Hay'at Tahrir al-Sham, a militant group involved in the Syrian civil war
- Helicopter Training School, of the Indian Air Force
- Human Terrain System, a US military program

== Places ==
- Holy Trinity School (Richmond Hill), Ontario, Canada
- Haibat Shahid railway station (station code HTS), in Pakistan
- Tri-State Airport (IATA airport code HTS), West Virginia, US
- The Heights (disambiguation) (Hts.)

== Science and technology ==
- High-temperature superconductivity, in physics
- High-throughput satellite, a communications satellite
- High-throughput screening, a drug discovery method
- High-throughput sequencing, in DNA sequencing
- Horizontal tab set, in the C1 control code set

== Other uses ==
- Hadza language (ISO 639 code hts), spoken in Tanzania
- HackThisSite, a website
- HTS Teologiese Studies, formerly Hervormde Teologiese Studies, a South African theological journal
- Home Team Sports, a former American sports network

== See also ==
- Harmonized Tariff Schedule of the United States (HTSUS or HTSA)
- HT (disambiguation)
