= Clinton Smith (architect) =

American architect

Clinton Smith (May 6, 1846, Middlebury, Vermont - August 2, 1905) was an American architect. He designed many buildings in Middlebury and around Vermont.

== Early life ==
Clinton Smith was born on the homestead farm of his family in the east part of Middlebury, Vermont, on May 6, 1846. He was the oldest son of George Smith and Julia Willmarth. He was descended from those who have been identified with the history of Vermont from the earliest times. His maternal ancestors made a record in the war of the Revolution and the war of 1812. His paternal grandfather came to Middlebury before the true site of the town was determined. His father George Smith will be remembered in Addison County, Vermont, as an educator and contracting builder.

== Career ==
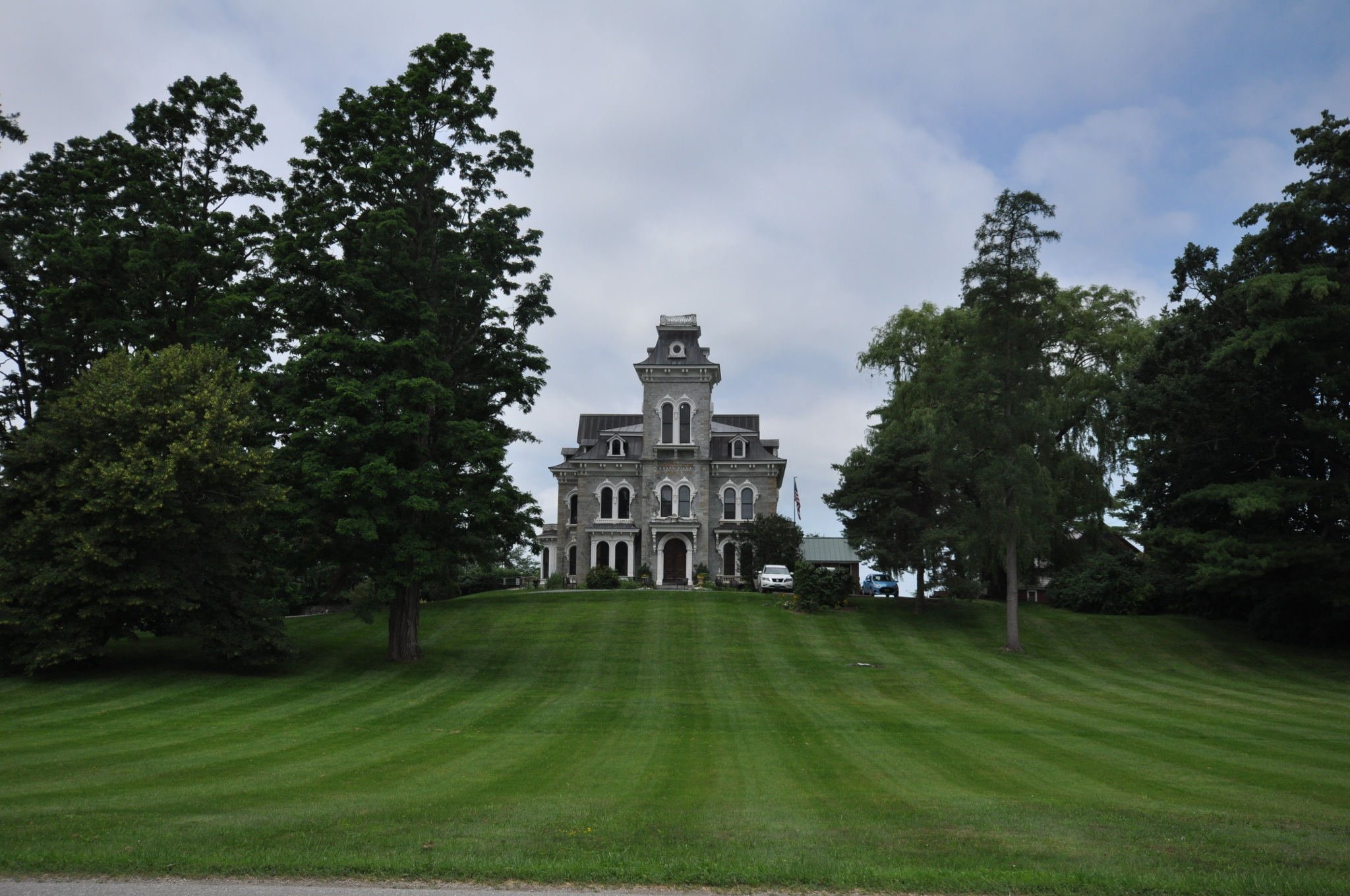
Shard Villa (1872-1874), 1177 Shard Villa Road, West Salisbury, VT

Clinton Smith was the architect and builder of many of the best buildings in Middlebury, Vermont, such as the court house, town hall, Methodist church, Baptist church, Beckwith block, Dyer block and many residences.

His first work of consequence was the erection of Shard Villa, the stone residence in Salisbury, Vermont, of Columbus Smith.

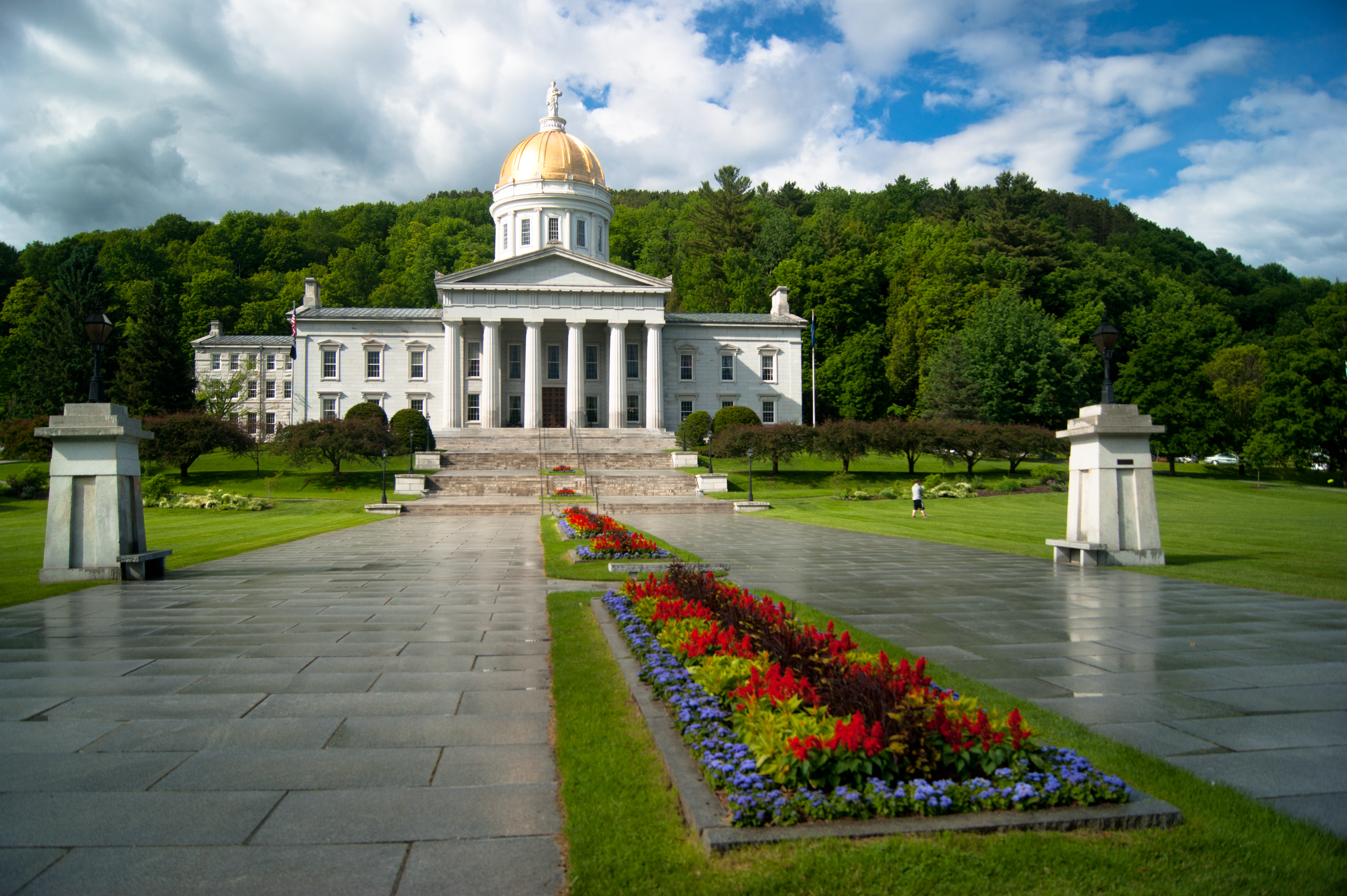
State Library & Supreme Court (1886), State Street, Montpelier, VT

He was widely known throughout the state also in adjacent parts of New Hampshire and New York, as a builder of churches and public buildings, among them the library annex to the Capitol building in Montpelier, Vermont, and the Asylum for the Insane at Waterbury, Vermont.

In 1891 he accepted a position in the War Department at Washington, D.C. as Chief of Construction and Repair under Hon. Redfield Proctor, then secretary of War in Harrison's administration, and with his family removed to the capital city. He served the government acceptably exactly fourteen years when he resigned his position partly on account of impaired health and partly from a wish to accept another position under Senator Redfield Proctor which offered him outside exercise and air of which so much desk work deprived him. His desk work, however, had been constantly alleviated by long trips to inspect buildings under construction at army posts and reservations in all parts of the United States, thus he became known to a wide circle of friends in every walk of life.

His resignation took effect June 1, 1905 and he became one of the incorporators of "The Talpin Construction Co.", in Washington and began the erection of its first building a large marble apartment house Champlain Apartment Building on K street in that city. This furnished him congenial and absorbing occupation until he was stricken by an alarming illness on July 28, 1905. Two trained nurses and his family attended his bedside. All that medical skill could accomplish was employed in vain. His disease was pronounced typhoid fever of a virulent type. He suffered hemorrhage after hemorrhage yet made a gallant fight for life till weakness prostrated every faculty and he died on the evening of August 2, 1905. This was his third attack of that dread disease. The first one was at the age of 14 years, the next 10 years later. Each attack was exceptionally severe and heightened by complications. His funeral was attended at his suburban residence "Smitholm" on August 4, 1905.

== Personal life ==
Clinton Smith married Alice Matilda "Olive" White. They had 6 children: Charles Lynn Smith (1869-1875), Clifton Roberts Smith (1878-1923), Delmar White Smith (1874-1949, contracting builder in Manila), Harold Smith (1882-1967), Leon Neil Smith (1889-1936), Helena Mercy Smith (b. 1872) (wife of Prof. Charles J. Bullock of Harvard).

He was buried at Foote Street Cemetery, Middlebury.

== Works ==
- Baptist Meeting House (1806 / 1862), Bingham St, West Cornwall, VT
- Winooski Commercial Block (1867), Winooski, VT
- Shard Villa (1872-1874), 1177 Shard Villa Road, West Salisbury, VT (NRHP: Shard Villa, October 30, 1989, #89001789)
- United Methodist Church (1874), 1 Franklin St., Brandon, VT
- Residence (1875 / demolished 1918), Seminary St., Middlebury, VT
- Residence (1803 / c. 1875), 71 S. Pleasant St, Middlebury, VT
- Carriage Barn (c. 1875 / demolished 1970s), behind 71 S. Pleasant St, Middlebury, VT
- The Four Sisters (1875–82), Seminary St, Middlebury, VT
- Foote Residence (1800 / 1877), Foote Rd, Middlebury, VT
- J. L. Barker Residence (1877), 8 Carver St, Brandon, VT
- Justin Batcheller Residence (1877), 55 N. Main St, Wallingford, VT
- Carriage Barn (1878), 55 N. Main St, Wallingford, VT
- School House (1878), 2320 Munger Street, Middlebury, VT
- Breeding Barn & Stable (1878), Weybridge, VT
- Eddy Residence (1810 / 1878), 73 Weybridge St, Middlebury, VT
- Clinton Smith Residence (1879), 45 Seminary St., Middlebury, VT
- Chandler Hotel (1879 / burned 1942), Silver Lake, Leicester, VT
- Bacheller Block (1879), 5 N. Main St, Wallingford, VT
- Deacon Crane Residence (1880), 13 Washington St., Middlebury, VT
- Quarry Hill School (c. 1880), Quarry Rd at Case St, Middlebury, VT
- Residence (1822 / c. 1880), 135 S. Pleasant St, Middlebury, VT
- Smith & Allen Mill (1881/1903), 1 Mill St, Middlebury, VT
- Methodist Church (1852 / 1881), West Addison, VT
- Forbes Residence (c. 1810 / 1881), 31 Court St. Middlebury, VT
- Wainwright House (1825 / 1881), N. Pleasant St, Middlebury, VT
- Farnsworth Residence (1882), 68 Washington St. Ext., Middlebury, VT
- Grace Baptist Church (1882), 52 Merchants Row, Middlebury, VT
- Bread Loaf Inn (1882), Ripton, VT
- Barn (1882) at the Bread Loaf Inn, Ripton, VT
- Henshaw Residence (1801 / 1882), 190 S. Pleasant St, Middlebury, VT
- Addison Co. Court House (1883), 5 Court St, Middlebury, VT
- Town Hall (1883), Middlebury, VT (NRHP: Middlebury Center Historic District, May 9, 1985, #85001019)
- Hooker Residence (1883), 20 Robbins Rd, Cornwall, VT
- James Residence (1810 / 1830s / 1883), 869 James Rd, Weybridge, VT
- Beckwith Commercial Block (1883), 30 Main St, Middlebury, VT
- Clinton Smith Residence (1884), 88 S. Pleasant St, Middlebury, VT
- Commercial Block (1884), 73 Main St, Middlebury, VT
- Holley Hall (1884), Bristol, VT (NRHP: Bristol Downtown Historic District, February 3, 1983, #83003203)
- Barn (1884) at Dean Stock Farm, 1287 N. Bingham St, Cornwall, VT
- Prentice Residence (1885), 999 Happy Valley Road, Middlebury, VT
- Otis Abbey Residence (1885), 19 South St, Middlebury, VT
- Smith Carriage Barn (1885), 88 S. Pleasant St, Middlebury, VT
- Stewart Carriage Barn (1885), 25 Stewart Ln, Middlebury, VT
- Universalist Church (1885), School St, Shoreham, VT
- Methodist Church (1885), West Rutland, VT
- Union Block (1885), Main St, Randolph, VT
- DuBois & Gay Block (1885 / demolished 1991), Main St, Randolph, VT
- Store for Charles Thurston (1885), West Randolph, VT
- Store for W. E. Lamson (1885), West Randolph, VT
- State Library & Supreme Court (1886), State Street, Montpelier, VT
- Town Hall (18xx / 1886), Westminster Rd. & River Rd, Walpole, NH
- Vermont Academy (1887), 20 Pleasant St, Saxtons River, VT (NRHP: Vermont Academy Campus Historic District, July 14, 2015, #15000423)
- Black River Academy (1887), 14 High St, Ludlow, VT (NRHP: Black River Academy, November 15, 1972, #72000108)
- Methodist Parsonage (1887), 22 Seminary St, Middlebury, VT
- Thad Chapman Estate (1870 / 1887), Route 30, Middlebury, VT (NRHP: The Heights (Middlebury, Vermont), December 29, 1988, #88003082)
- Trinity Parish House (1887), 227 Sherman St, Watertown, NY (NRHP: Trinity Episcopal Church and Parish House (Watertown, New York), June 30, 2000, #00000747)
- Post Office (1888 / demolished 1970s), State Street, Montpelier, VT
- Mt. Moriah Presbyterian Church (1888), 19 Church St, Port Henry, NY
- School (1888), 30 Pine St, Rutland, VT
- Congregational Church (1834 / 1888), 30 S Water St, Vergennes, VT
- Munson Barn (1888), 1774 US 7 South, Wallingford, VT
- Baxter Memorial Library (1889), 96 Grove St, Rutland, VT
- First Baptist Church (1870/1889), 190 Main St, Brattleboro, VT
- Asylum for Paupers & Insane (1890), 103 S Main St, Waterbury, VT
- Congregational Church (1890 / 1929), Town Hill Rd, New Haven, VT (NRHP: Plymouth Congregational Church (New Haven, Connecticut), July 28, 1983, #83001250)
- Methodist Church (1891), 40 Crown Point Rd, Bridport, VT
- Spaulding Graded School (1891), 60 Washington St, Barre, VT
- Methodist Church (1892–93), 47 N. Pleasant St, Middlebury, VT
- Congregational Church (1892), 48 Pleasant St, Ludlow, VT (NRHP: Congregational Church of Ludlow, January 28, 2004, #03001541)
- Commercial Block (1892), 201 North Main St, Barre, VT
- Battell Commercial Block (1892–98), Merchants Row & Main Street, Middlebury, VT
- Cobb Commercial Block (1892), 48-50 Main St, Middlebury, VT
- Brook Farm (1894), Twenty Mile Stream Rd. northwest of Cavendish, Cavendish, VT (NRHP: Brook Farm (Cavendish, Vermont), July 22, 1993, #93000676)
- Residence (c. 1896), 48 South Street, Middlebury, VT
- Champlain Apartment Building (1905), 1424 K Street NW, Washington, DC (NRHP: Champlain Apartment Building, September 7, 1994, #94001042)

== Gallery ==
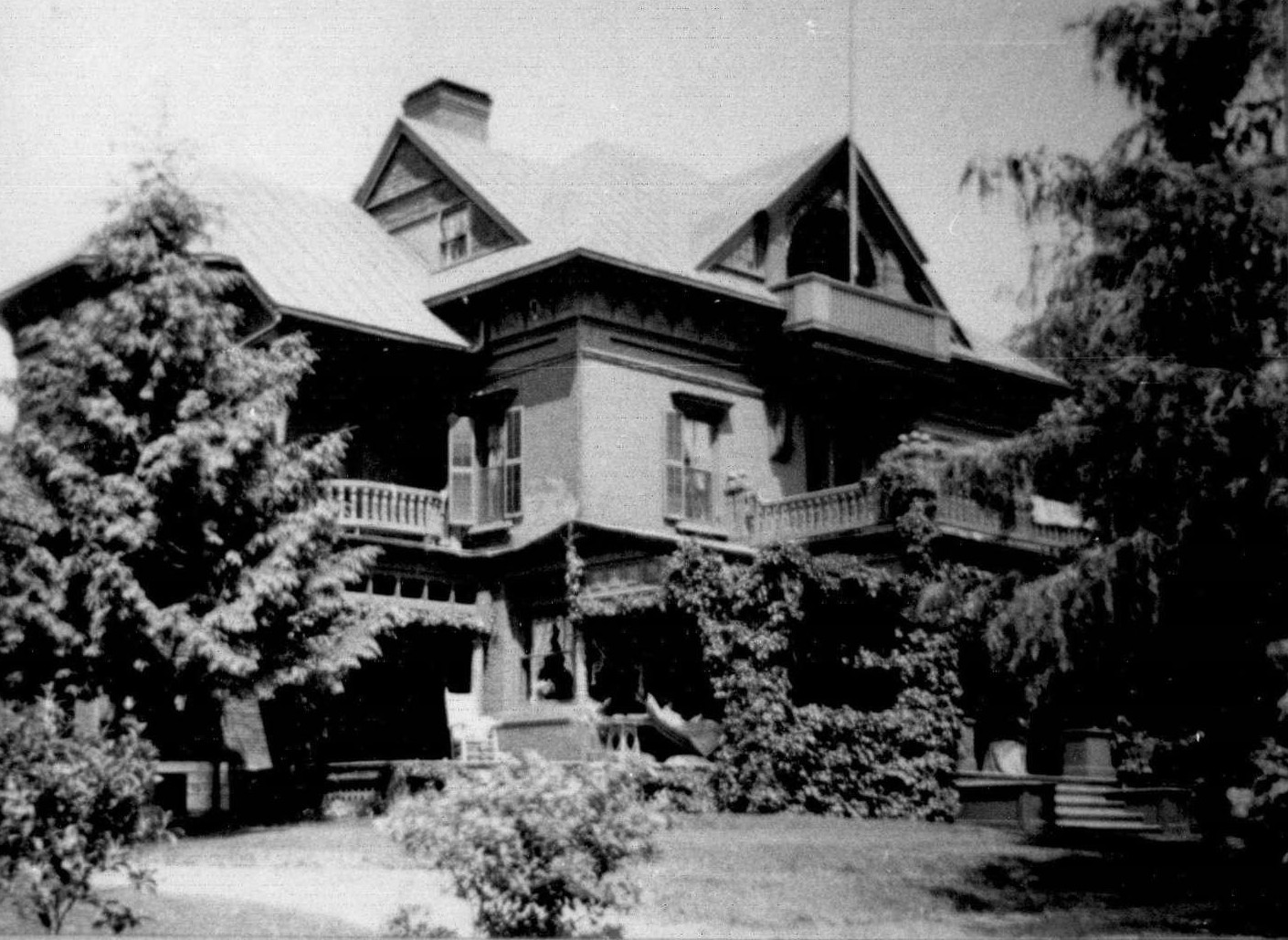
The Heights, Thad Chapman Estate (1870 / 1887), Route 30, Middlebury, VT

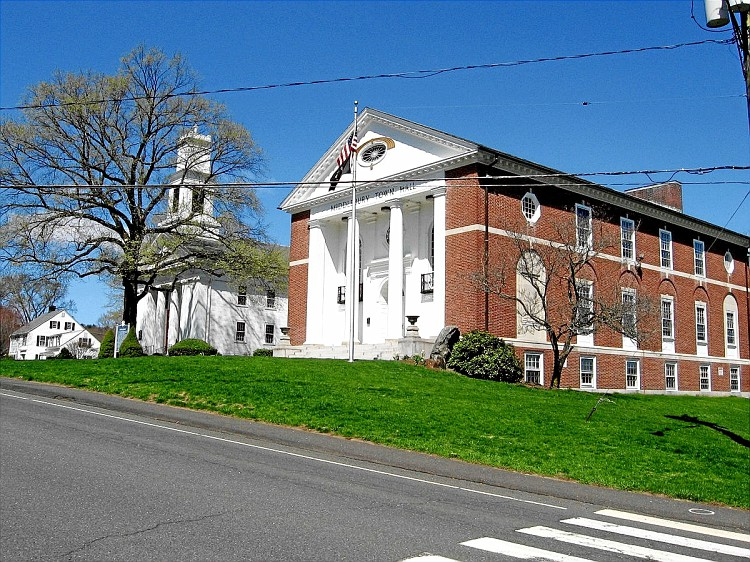
Town Hall (1883), Middlebury, VT

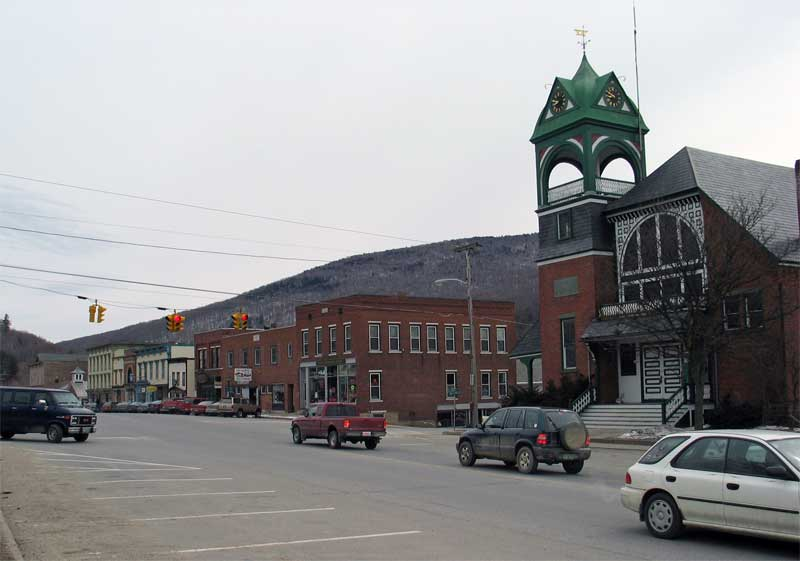
Holley Hall (1884), Bristol, VT

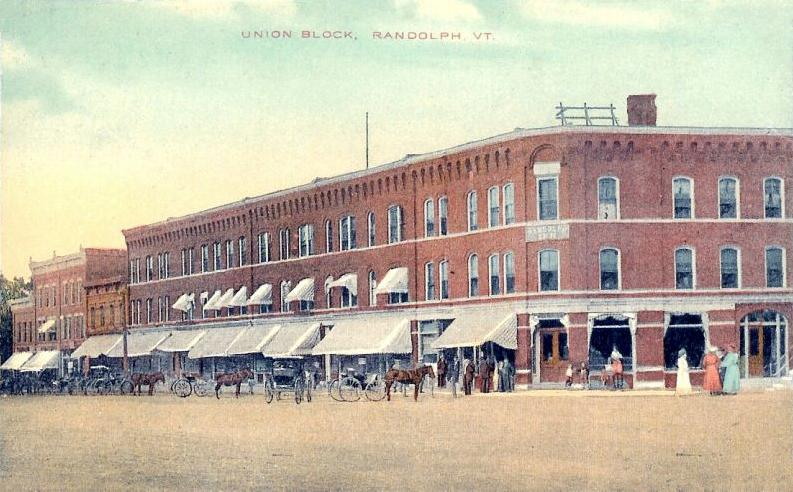
Union Block (1885), Main St, Randolph, VT

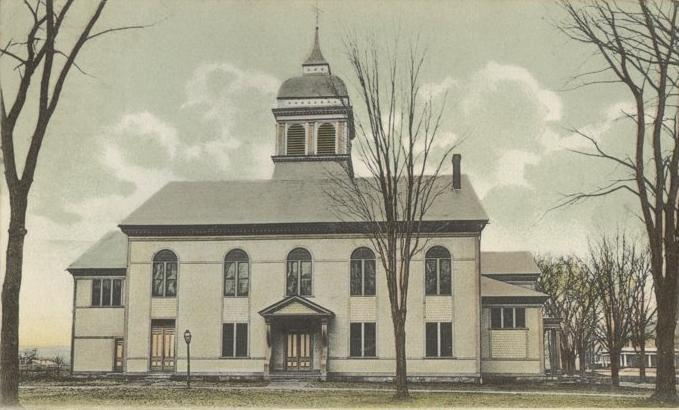
Town Hall (18xx / 1886), Westminster Rd. & River Rd, Walpole, NH

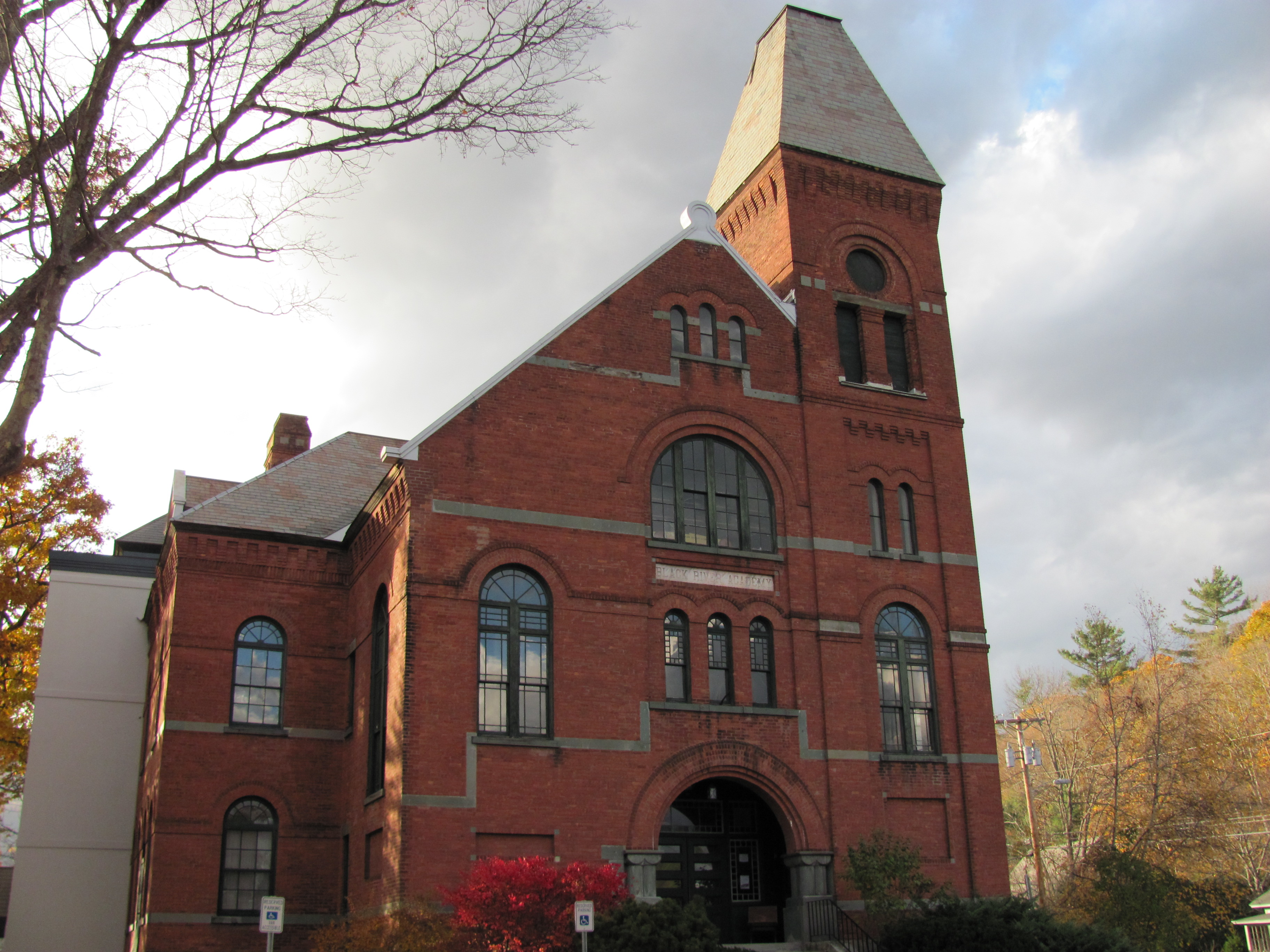
Black River Academy (1887), 14 High St, Ludlow, VT

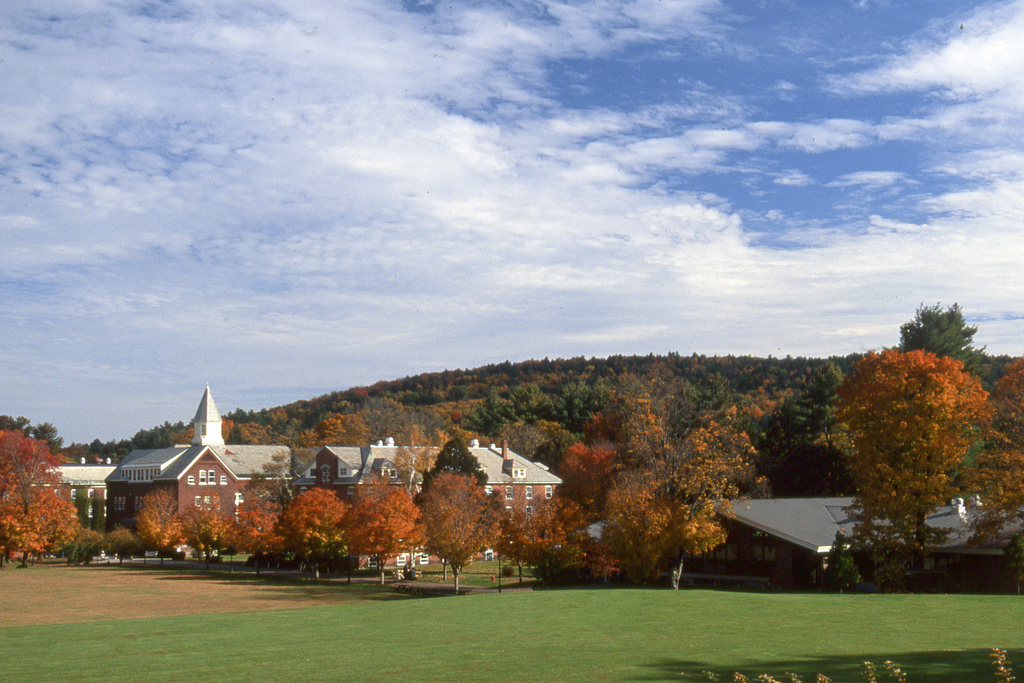
Vermont Academy (1887), 20 Pleasant St, Saxtons River, VT

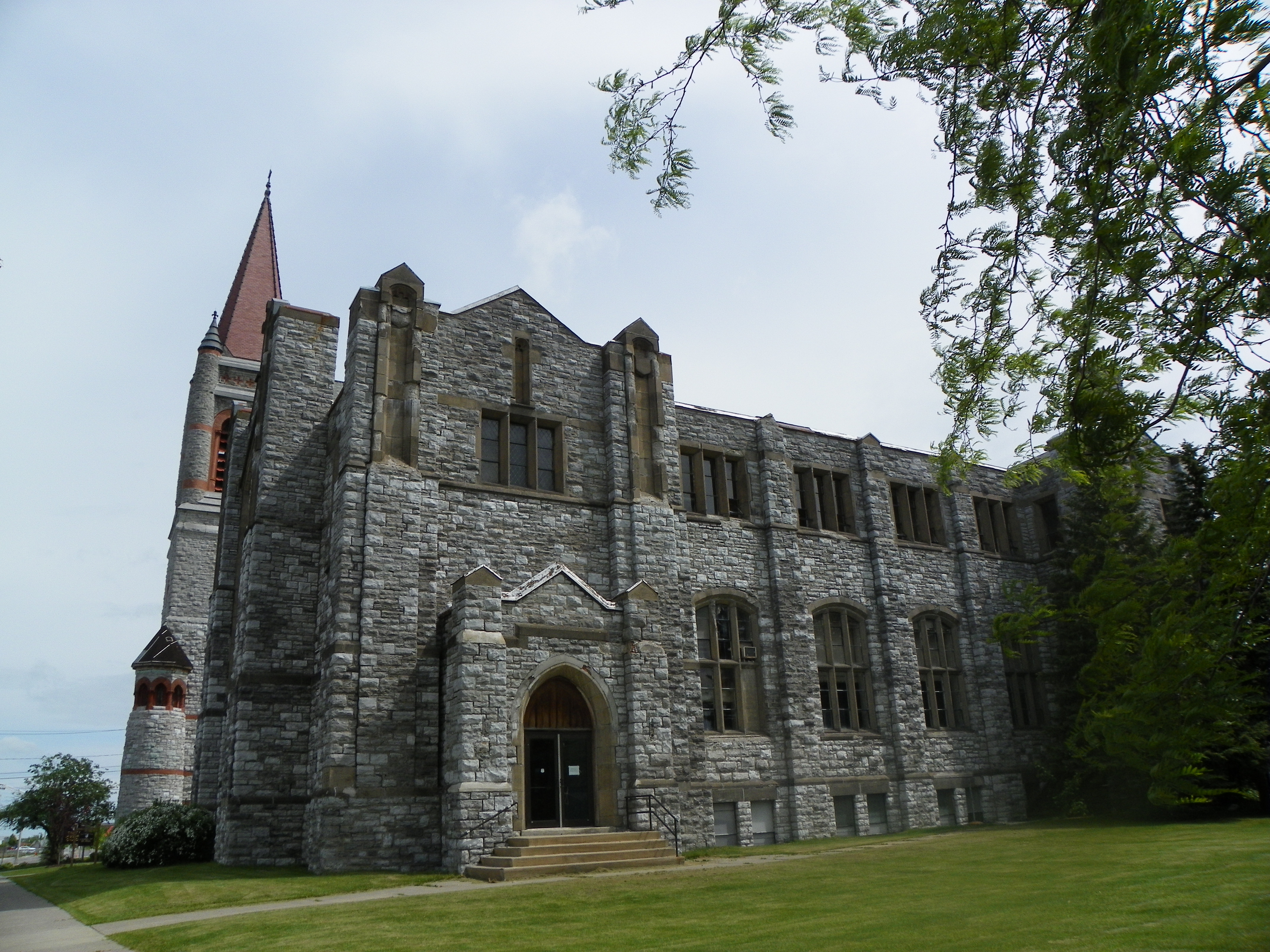
Trinity Parish House (1887), 227 Sherman St, Watertown, NY

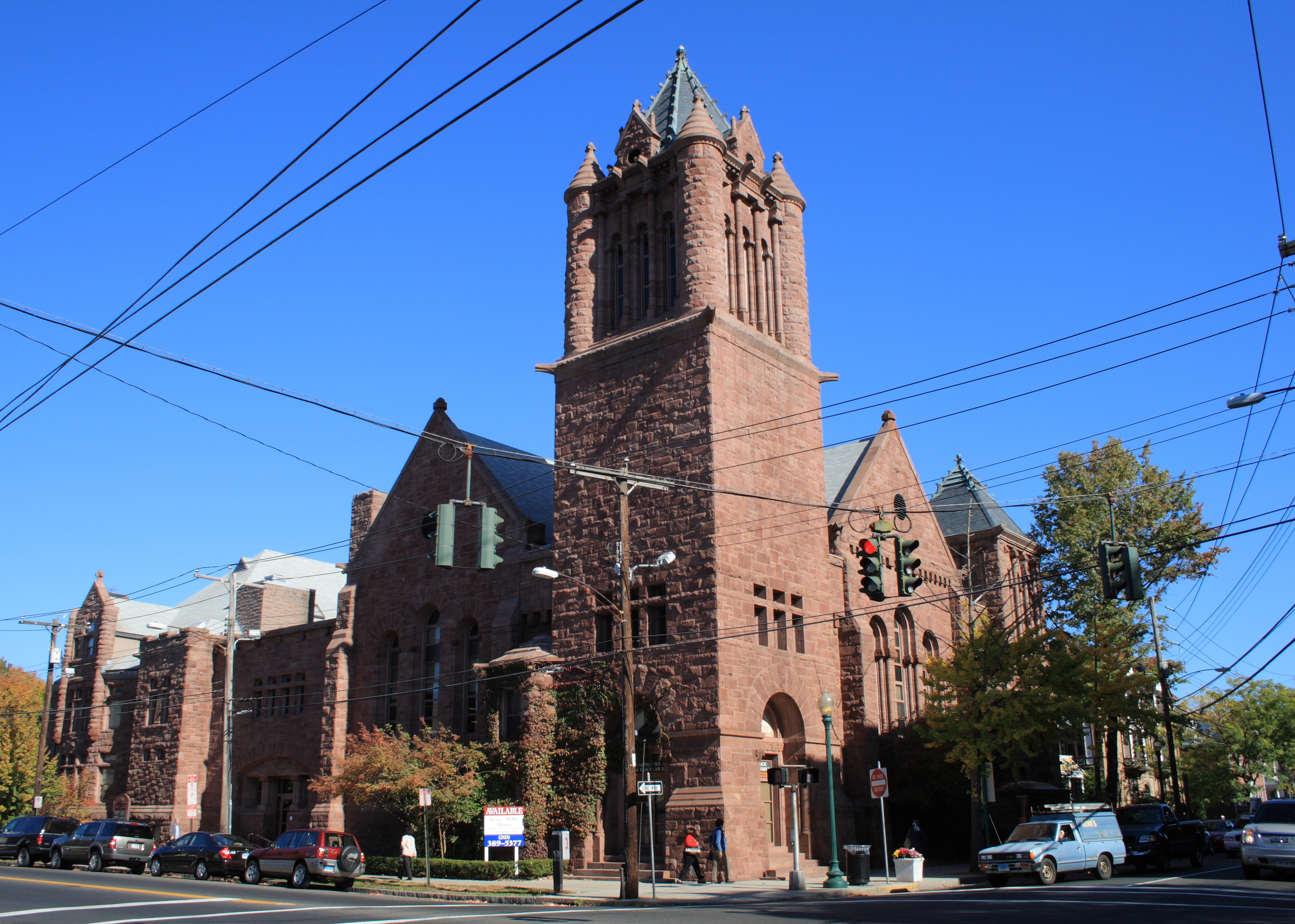
Congregational Church (1890 / 1929), Town Hill Rd, New Haven, VT

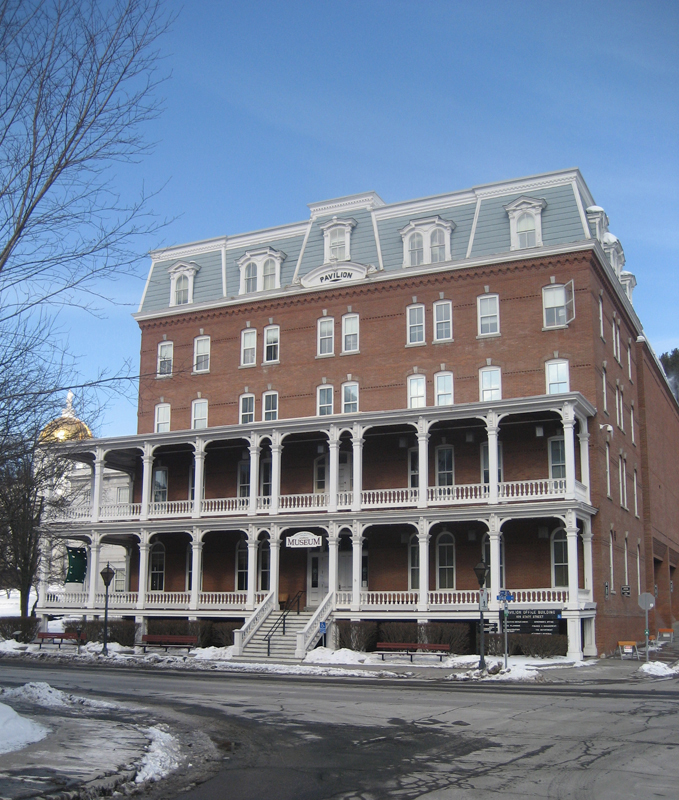
Spaulding Graded School (1891), 60 Washington St, Barre, VT

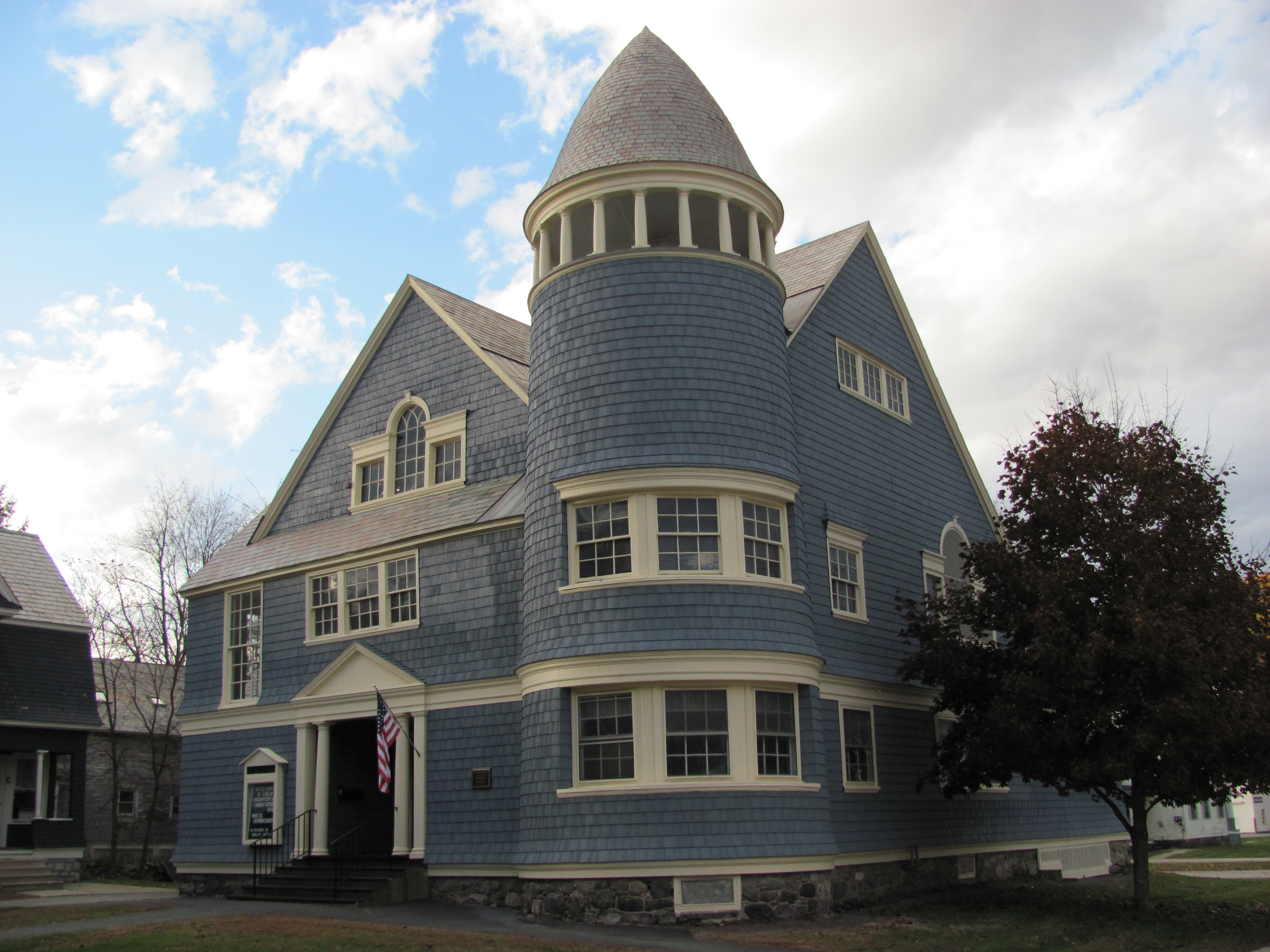
Congregational Church (1892), 48 Pleasant St, Ludlow, VT

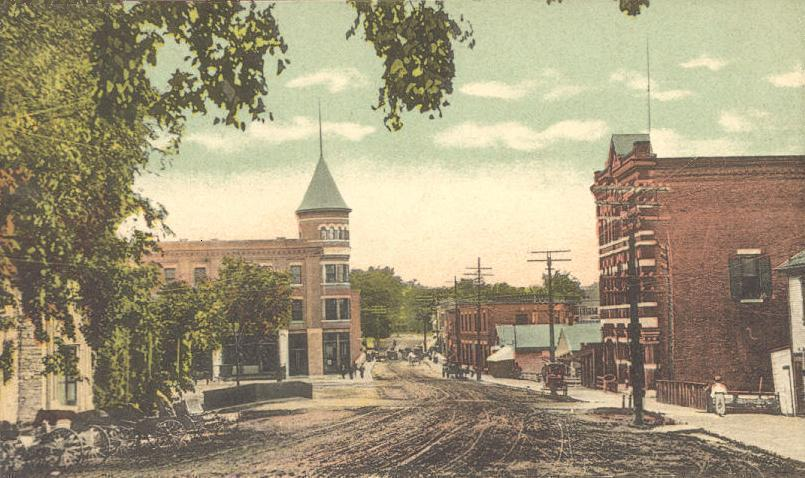
Battell Commercial Block (1892–98), Merchants Row & Main Street, Middlebury, VT

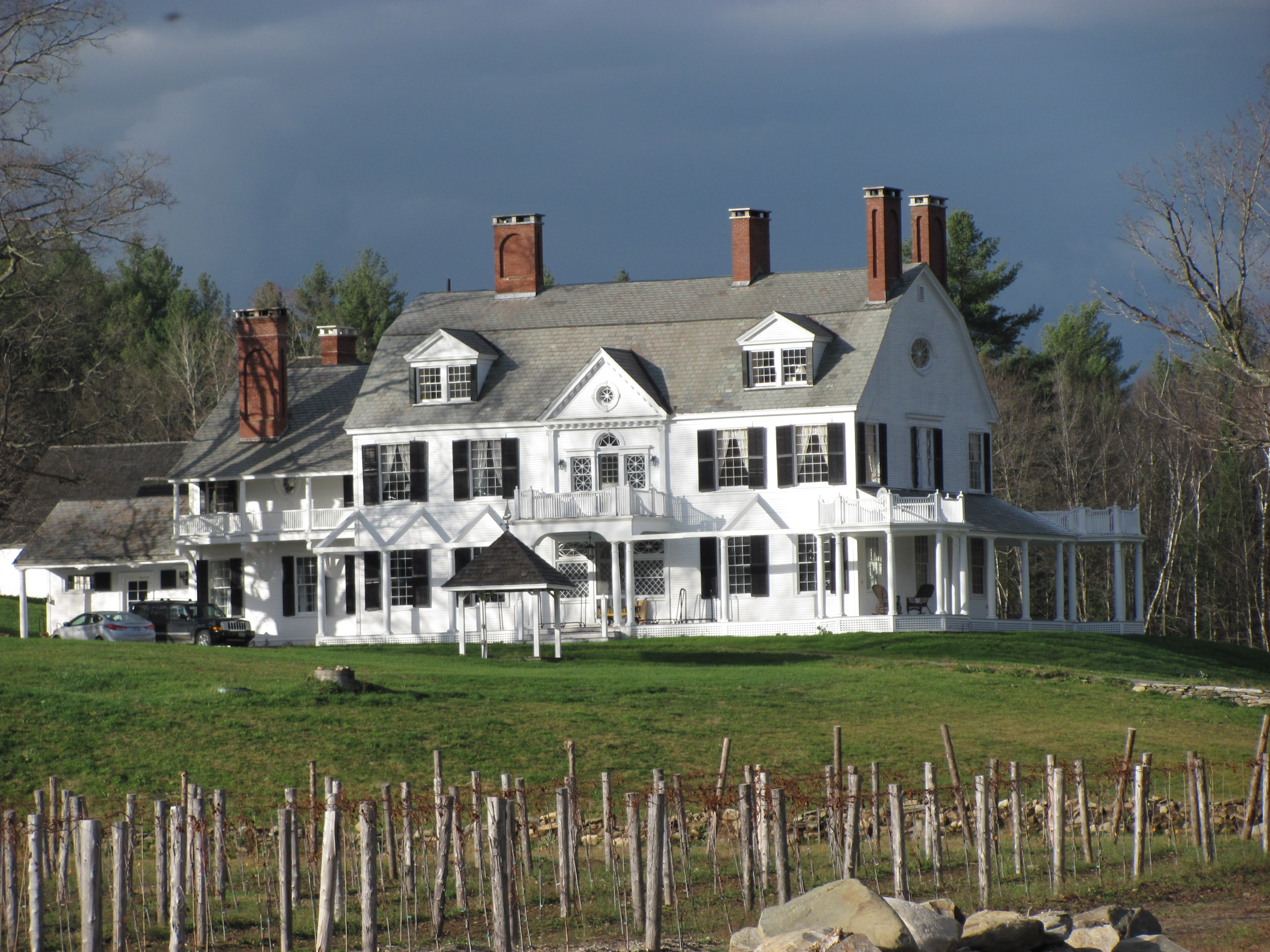
Brook Farm (1894), Twenty Mile Stream Rd. northwest of Cavendish, Cavendish, VT

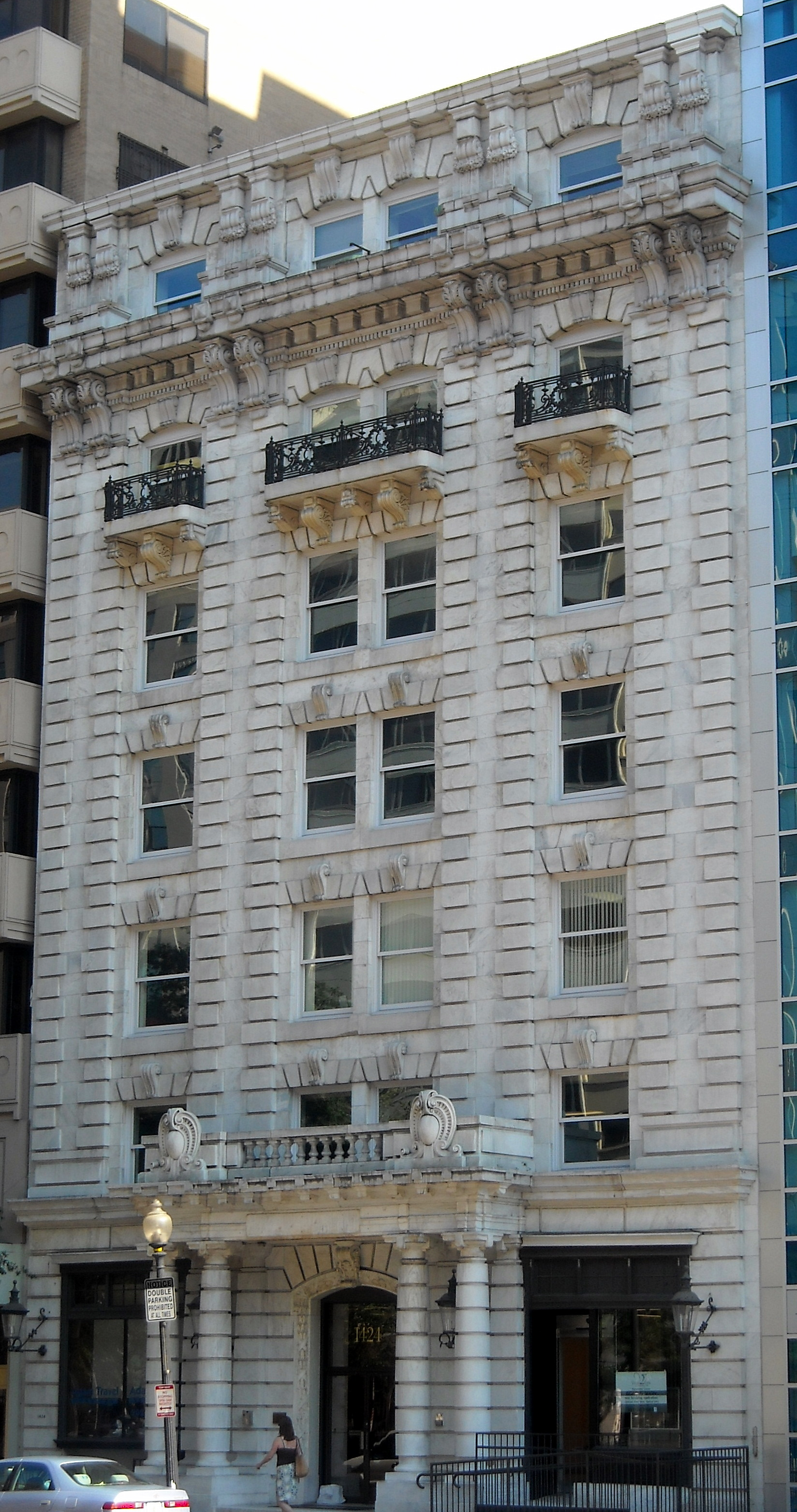
Champlain Apartment Building (1905), 1424 K Street NW, Washington, DC
