= Height (disambiguation) =

Height is the measurement of vertical distance.

Height may also refer to:

== Mathematics and computer science ==
- Height (abelian group), an invariant that captures the divisibility properties of an element
- Height (ring theory), a measurement in commutative algebra
- Height (triangle) or altitude
- Height function, a function that quantifies the complexity of mathematical objects
- Height of a field, exponent of torsion in the Witt group
- Height, the logarithm of the first nonzero term in the formal power series
- Tree height, length of the longest root-to-leaf path in a tree data structure

== Music ==
- Height (musician), Baltimore hip hop artist
- Height (album), an album by John Nolan

== People ==
- Amy Height (c. 1866–1913), African-American music hall entertainer in the UK
- Bob Height, 19th century African-American blackface minstrel performer
- Dorothy Height (1912–2010), civil rights activist
- Romello Height (born 2001), American football player

== See also ==
- The Heights (disambiguation), including "Heights"
- Human height
- Height discrimination
- Tree height measurement
- Reduced height of a field, the Pythagoras number
