= Theological studies =

Theological studies may refer to:

- Theology, the academic discipline
- Theological Studies (journal), an academic journal published in the United States
- Theological Studies/Teologiese Studies, an academic journal published in South Africa
