= Clinton Smith =

Clinton Smith may refer to:

- Clinton Smith (architect) (1846–1905), American architect
- Clinton Smith (basketball) (born 1964), basketball player

== See also ==
- Clint Smith (disambiguation)
