= The Heights =

The Heights or Heights may refer to:

== Places ==
=== United States ===
- Brooklyn Heights, a historic neighborhood of Brooklyn, New York
- Cleveland Heights, Ohio, an inner-ring suburb of Cleveland, Ohio
- Glendale Heights, Illinois, a suburb west of Chicago, Illinois
- Hacienda Heights, California, a suburban community of Los Angeles, California
- Houston Heights, a historic neighborhood of Houston, Texas
- Pulaski Heights, a section of Little Rock, Arkansas
- Sterling Heights, Michigan, a suburb of Detroit, Michigan
- The Heights, the neighborhood consisting primarily of the University of Cincinnati, Cincinnati, Ohio
- The Heights (Middlebury, Vermont) (also known as Thaddeus Chapman House), a historic country estate in Vermont
- The Heights, Jersey City, New Jersey
- Washington Heights, Manhattan, a neighborhood of Uptown Manhattan

=== Elsewhere ===
- El Alto, a city in Bolivia
- Cambrian Heights, Calgary, a neighbourhood in Calgary, Alberta
- Heights, Greater Manchester, a hamlet in the Metropolitan Borough of Oldham, UK

== Schools ==
- The Heights School (Australia)
- The Heights School (Maryland)

== Entertainment ==
=== Film and television ===
- Heights (film), a 2005 drama starring Glenn Close
- The Heights (American TV series), a 1992 American drama television series that aired on Fox
  - The Heights, also the name of the band in the series above
- The Heights (Australian TV series), a 2019 Australian drama television series starring Marcus Graham
- "The Heights" (The O.C.), a 2003 episode of the TV series The O.C.

=== Music ===
- Heights (band), a British rock band from Hertfordshire
- Heights (album), a 2021 album by Walk the Moon
- "The Heights", a 2023 song by Blur from The Ballad of Darren
- "Heights", a 2009 song by Eyes Set to Kill from The World Outside
- "Heights", a 2021 song by Nick Jonas from Spaceman

== Other ==
- Al-A'raf, Arabic for "The Heights", the seventh chapter of the Qur'an
- The Heights (newspaper), Boston College's independent student newspaper
- The Heights: Anatomy of a Skyscraper, non-fiction book
- Heights F.C., a football club in Northern Ireland
- The Heights, a historic house museum in the city of Geelong, Victoria, Australia.
- New York Heights, an upcoming Women's Pro Baseball League team in New York City

== See also ==
- Height (disambiguation)
