= Olive White Smith =

American religious writer (1846–1918)

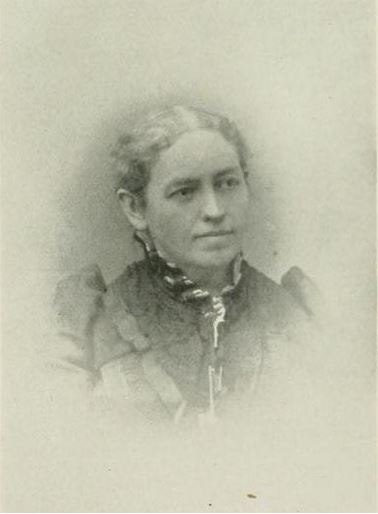
Olive White Smith

Alice Matilda "Olive" White Smith (December 25, 1846 - August 26, 1918) was an American writer and poet, best known in literature as Mrs. Clinton Smith.

== Early life ==
Alice Matilda "Olive" White was born in Clarendon, Vermont, on December 25, 1846. Her ancestors were among the early settlers of Vermont. Her father, Charles White, was a pioneer geologist and the discoverer of several of the Vermont marble quarries. Her childhood was passed among the Green Mountains. She grew up with a stern morality, tempered by a love of humanity, which led her in girlhood to be intelligently interested in the abolition of slavery.

She was educated under Mrs. H. F. Leavitt. in the female seminary established by Emma Willard, in Middlebury, Vermont.

== Career ==
Olive White Smith was generally known in literature as Mrs. Clinton Smith.

She was interested in home and foreign missions. She was an enthusiastic friend of the Woman's Christian Temperance Union. Although her home was far from the center of world events, she lived in the current of daily life.

Possessing a reverence for law, she marveled at the ease with which the prohibitory liquor law of her State was evaded. After spending much time and energy in interviewing judges, justices, sheriffs and States' attorneys, she came to the conclusion that those officers, holding their positions through the votes of a political party, would go no further in good works than that party demands. Her parlors was a gathering place for temperance people and prohibitionists. She wrote some temperance articles and addresses, as well as short poems and stories, for New York papers and magazines.

All of her life she was connected with Sunday school work in the Methodist Episcopal Church. She was a contributor to the Rural New Yorker, the New York Weekly Witness, the Demorest's Magazine and other periodicals.

She used the pen-names "Alicia" and "August Noon."

== Personal life ==
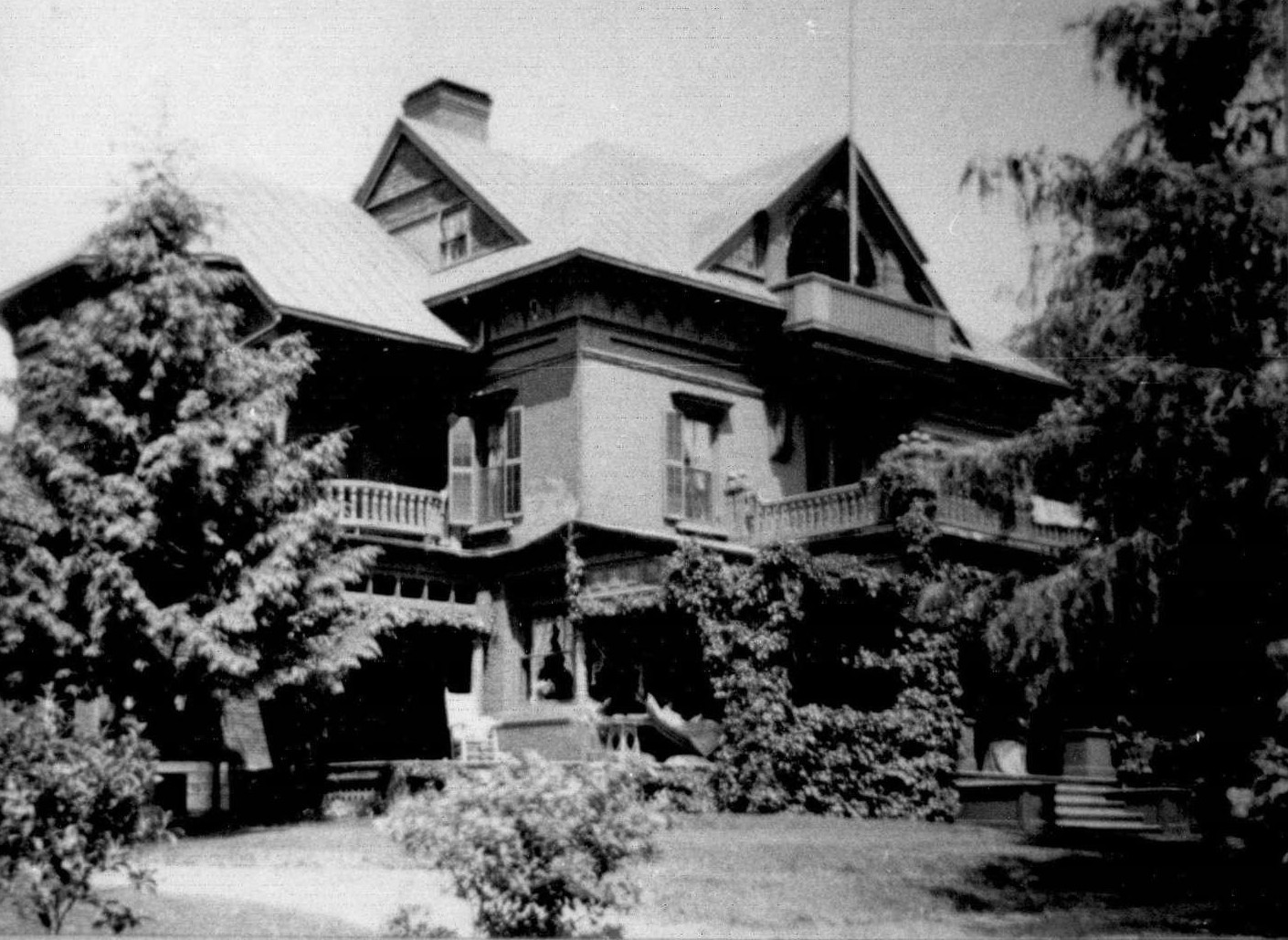
The Heights (Middlebury, Vermont), designed by Clinton Smith

Olive White married architect Clinton Smith (1846-1905) and their home was in Middlebury, Vermont, until 1891, when her husband accepted a position in the War Department in Washington, D.C., as Chief of Construction and Repair under Redfield Proctor, then Secretary of War in the Harrison administration, and moved his family to that city, where Smith was actively engaged in literary pursuits.

They had six children: Charles Lynn Smith (1869-1875), Clifton Roberts Smith (1878-1923), Delmar White Smith (1874-1949, contracting builder in Manila), Harold Smith (1882-1967), Leon Neil Smith (1889-1936), Helena Mercy Smith (b. 1872) (wife of Prof. Charles J. Bullock of Harvard).

Clinton Smith designed many buildings in Middlebury and around Vermont, such as the court house, town hall, Methodist church, Baptist church, Beckwith block, Dyer block and many residences, including the South Pleasant Street, Middlebury, residence where they lived. He designed the Shard Villa, the stone residence in Salisbury, Vermont, of Columbus Smith. He designed also the library annex to the Capitol building in Montpelier, Vermont, and the Vermont State Hospital at Waterbury.

She died on August 26, 1918, and is buried with her husband at Foote Street Cemetery, Middlebury, under a beautiful monument.
