= Clint Smith =

Clint Smith may refer to:

- Clint Smith (writer) (born 1988), American writer, poet, and scholar
- Clint Smith (ice hockey) (1913–2009), Canadian ice hockey centre

== See also ==
- Clinton Smith (disambiguation)
