= Brook Farm (Cavendish, Vermont) =

- U.S. National Register of Historic Places
- U.S. Historic district
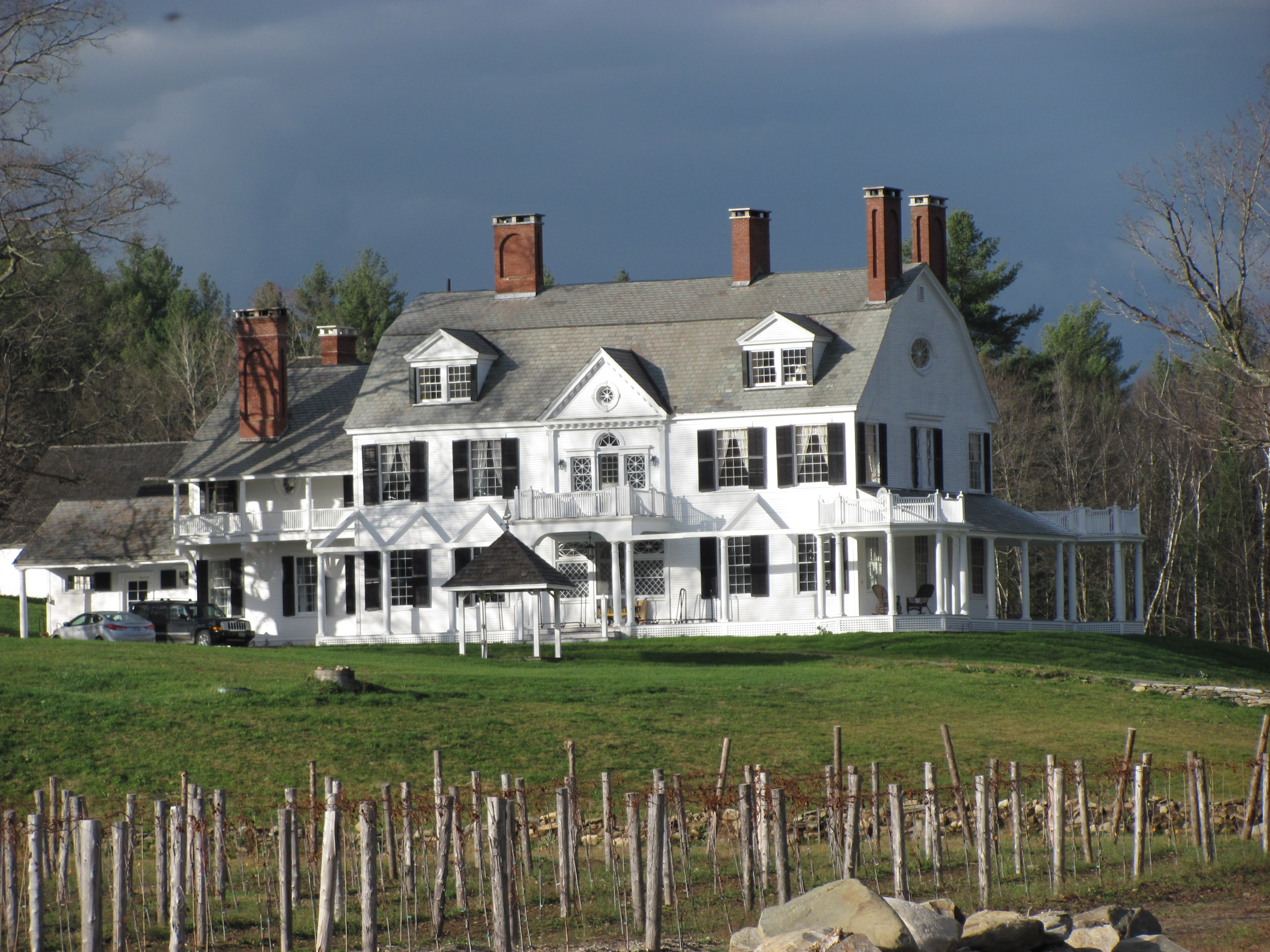

- Location within Vermont Location within the United States
- Location: 4203 Twenty Mile Stream Rd., Cavendish, Vermont
- Coordinates: 43°26′30″N 72°39′20″W
- Area: 23 acres (9.3 ha)
- Built: 1894
- Architectural style: Colonial Revival
- MPS: Agricultural Resources of Vermont MPS
- NRHP reference No.: 93000676
- Added to NRHP: July 22, 1993

Brook Farm is a historic country estate farm at 4203 Twenty Mile Stream Road in Cavendish, Vermont. It includes one of the state's grandest Colonial Revival mansion houses (built 1894), and surviving outbuildings of a model farm of the turn of the 20th century. It was listed on the National Register of Historic Places in 1993. The property is no longer home to the Brook farm vineyard.

== Description and history ==
Brook Farm is located on 45 acres (18 ha) in rural northwestern Cavendish, with its complex of buildings set on the west side of Twenty Mile Stream Road. The property includes rolling fields separated by rows of trees and stone walls, and overlooks Twenty Mile Stream to the east. Most of the farm buildings are arrayed along a basically semicircular drive, with the house, horse stable, and cow barn dominating the collection of about ten buildings. The main house is a rectangular 2 1/2-story wood-frame structure, set on a stone foundation, with extensions in the shape of a backwards L on the west side. The main block has a gambrel roof with dormers on both sides, and a small gable above the main entrance at the center of the south side. A single-story porch, in parts with an open roof, wraps around the south, east and north sides, with projecting pavilions at the two corners. The porch projects in front of the entrance, with an open balcony area above. Both the main entrance and the balcony entrance have a Palladian arrangement of sash windows on either side of the door. The interior of house is richly decorated with woodwork and vaulted plaster ceilings in the public rooms.

Farming began on this property in 1788, and it grew over the 19th century to become one of Cavendish's largest and most successful dairy farms. In 1881 it was purchased by James H. Bates, a cousin of the previous owner, who had found success as a businessman in Brooklyn, New York and Kalamazoo, Michigan. Bates transformed the property into a model farm, and moved the original farmstead to another location in order to build the mansion house that stands today. Documentation suggests that Middlebury architect Clinton Smith was involved in its design, on which construction was completed in 1894. Most of the remaining farm buildings date to the late 19th century, although the original 1790 barn was part of the Bates's original plan. That barn collapsed in 1988. The property is now a vineyard.

The historical importance of this property and others were evaluated in a study, "Agricultural Resources of Vermont MPS".

== See also ==
- National Register of Historic Places listings in Windsor County, Vermont
