= Andries van Aarde =

Andries Gideon van Aarde
- Born: Andries; 25 April 1951
- Died: 26 November 2024 (aged 73)
- Citizenship: South Africa
- Occupation: theologian
- Employer: University of Pretoria

Andries Gideon van Aarde (25 April 1951 – 25 November 2024) was a professor of theology and a research fellow at the University of Pretoria. He also worked as a researcher-in-residence at the Durban University of Technology. He was an ordained minister in the Netherdutch Reformed Church of Africa.

Van Aarde spent his life in academia and largely at the University of Pretoria. He earned a variety of accreditations: a Master's Degree in Semitic languages, a doctorate in theology, a doctorate in ancient cultural studies, and a doctorate in Hellenistic Greek. During his career, he wrote six monographs, more than 50 book chapters, and over 250 scholarly articles. He served as editor-in-chief of the journal HTS Teologiese Studies (HTS Theological Studies) in 1985–2023, where among his editing work, he saw the publication transformed into an open-access journal. His works earned him the Andrew Murray-Desmond Tutu Prize for religious and theological books in 2022.

A topic of interest for van Aarde was the "Historical Jesus", scholarly attempts to distinguish which stories of Jesus "really happened", which were exaggerated, and which were later creations and legends. He was a founding member of the Jesus Seminar, a group organized in 1985 to investigate the topic.

Van Aarde was also active in attempting to heal the wounds of post-apartheid South Africa, and championed work to aid communities still marginalized and impoverished from the remnants of the apartheid era.

Van Aarde died on 25 November 2024.
