= Champlain Apartment Building =

Historic building in Washington, D.C., U.S.

- U.S. National Register of Historic Places
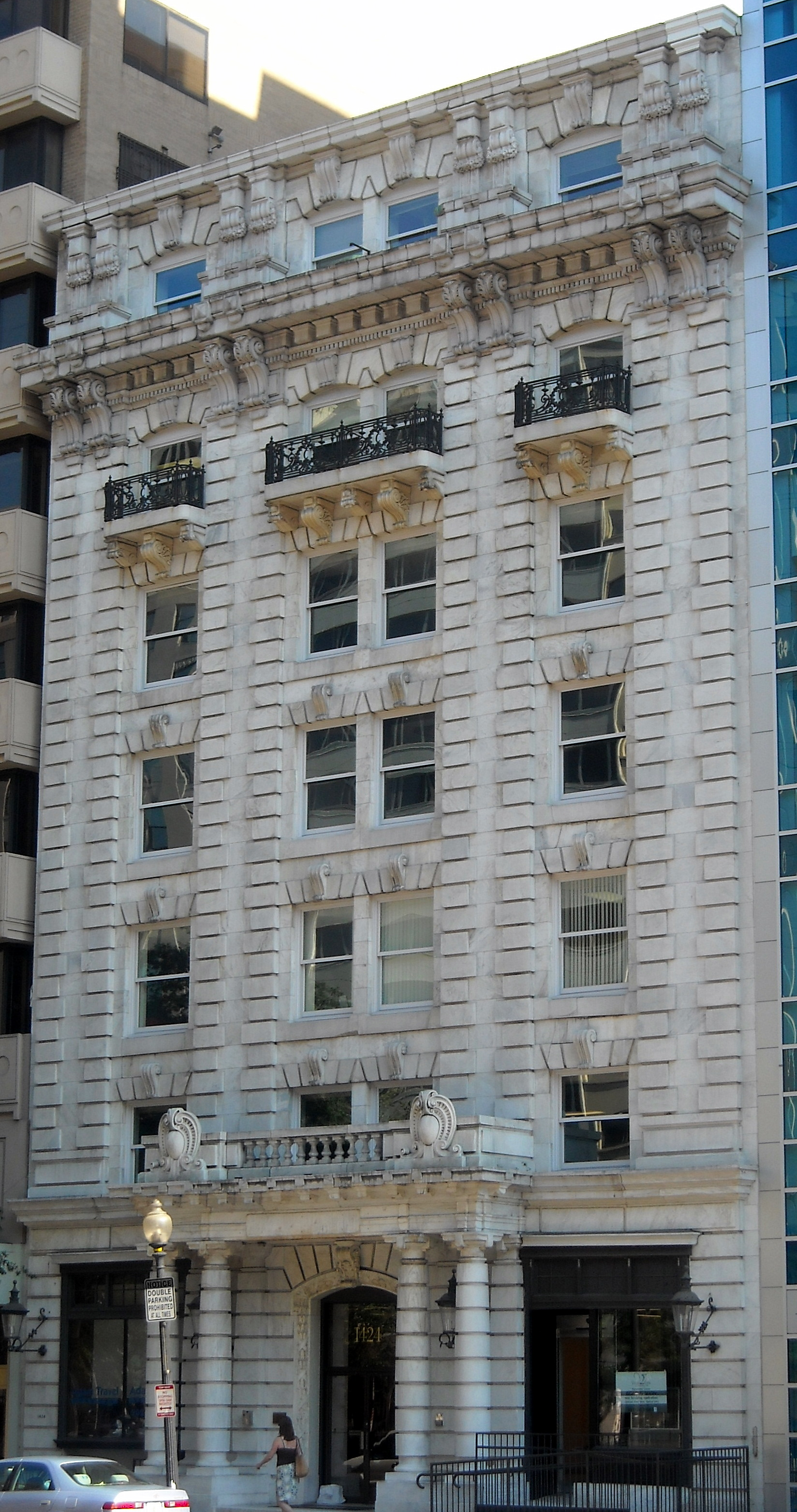

- Location within Washington, D.C.
- Location: 1424 K St., NW; Washington, D.C.
- Coordinates: 38°54′9″N 77°1′58″W
- Built: 1905
- Architect: Clinton Smith
- Architectural style: Beaux-Arts
- MPS: Apartment Buildings in Washington, DC, MPS
- NRHP reference No.: 94001042
- Added to NRHP: September 7, 1994

The Champlain Apartment Building, also known as the Orme Building, is an historic structure located at 1424 K St., Northwest, Washington, D.C., in the Downtown neighborhood.

== History ==
The building was designed by architect Clinton Smith and constructed in 1905. A real estate venture of Senator Redfield Proctor of Vermont (who was also the president of the Vermont Marble Company), it features a white marble Beaux-Arts Classical façade. The building exemplifies the importance of elected officials on Washington's design and the significance of private construction in implementing the City Beautiful movement in Washington. Converted into an office building, it was listed on the National Register of Historic Places in 1994.
