= Kate Ascher =

American executive

- Born: United States
- Occupations: Executive, writer, author, associate professor
- Notable work: The Heights: Anatomy of a Skyscraper

Kate Ascher is an author and was executive vice president of the New York City Economic Development Corporation. Her 2005 book, The Works: Anatomy of a City, a textual and graphic exploration of how the complicated and often overlapping infrastructure of a modern city works, garnered wide discussion and praise when it was published. She left the NYCEDC in 2007 for Vornado Realty Trust. She formerly held positions with the Port Authority of New York and New Jersey and in corporate finance.

In the wake of the 2007 New York City steam explosion Ascher was quoted by several media outlets on the history and nature of utility steam use. "We are an older city with infrastructure that was sophisticated in its time," she told the New York Sun. "In any one of those systems, there is older pipe and newer pipe."

Asher is an Associate Professor of Professional Practice at Columbia University's Graduate School of Architecture, Planning, and Preservation.

In 2011, Ascher's book The Heights: Anatomy of a Skyscraper was published.

== Education ==
Ascher received her M.Sc. and Ph.D. in government from the London School of Economics and her B.A. in political science from Brown University.
