= Bristol Motor Speedway =

Motorsport track in the United States

The Last Great Colosseum

- Oval (1961–present)
- Location: 151 Speedway Boulevard, Bristol, Tennessee
- Coordinates: 36°30′56″N 82°15′25″W
- Capacity: 146,000
- Owner: Speedway Motorsports (January 1996–present); Larry Carrier (July 1961–October 1977, January 1986–December 1995)
- Operator: Speedway Motorsports (January 1996–present)
- Broke ground: January 25, 1961; 65 years ago
- Opened: July 23, 1961; 65 years ago
- Construction cost: US$600,000
- Former names: Bristol International Raceway (1978–1996); Bristol International Speedway (1961–1978)
- Major events: Current: NASCAR Cup Series; Food City 500 (1961–present); Bass Pro Shops Night Race (1961–present); NASCAR All-Star Race (2020); NASCAR O'Reilly Auto Parts Series; Suburban Propane 300 (1982–2020, 2025–present); Food City 300 (1982–present); NASCAR Truck Series; Tennessee Army National Guard 250 (2021–present); UNOH 200 (1995–present); ARCA Menards Series; Bush's Beans 200 (2020–present)
- Website: bristolmotorspeedway.com

Oval (1961–present)
- Surface: Concrete
- Length: 0.533 mi (0.858 km)
- Turns: 4
- Banking: Turns: 24–28° Straights: 4–8°
- Race lap record: 0:14.945 ( (United States) Kyle Larson, Chevrolet SS, 2018, NASCAR Cup)

Temporary Dirt Oval (2020–2023)
- Surface: Clay
- Length: 0.533 mi (0.858 km)
- Turns: 4
- Banking: Turns: 16–19° Straights: 9°
- Race lap record: 0:19.003 ( (Canada) Stewart Friesen, Toyota Tundra NASCAR, 2021, NASCAR Truck)

Bristol Motor Speedway (formerly known as the Bristol International Raceway from 1978 to 1996 and as the Bristol International Speedway from 1961 to 1978) is a 0.533 mi (0.858 km) oval short track in Bristol, Tennessee. The track has held a variety of events since its opening in 1961, including NASCAR races, NCAA FBS college football games, and sprint car races. The speedway has a capacity of 146,000 as of 2021. In addition to the main oval, the facility's complex also features a two-lane, 0.250 mi (0.402 km) long drag strip. Bristol Motor Speedway is currently owned by Speedway Motorsports, LLC (SMI) with Jerry Caldwell serving as the track's general manager.

On January 17, 1961, local Tennessean recreational conglomerate businessman Larry Carrier announced his intentions of building a racetrack in Bristol, expanding his recreational conglomerate within the Tri-Cities, Tennessee, area. The track was constructed with no major issues, and opened in July of that same year for a speed record run. Carrier ran the track until 1977, when it was sold to businessmen Gary Baker and Lanny Hester. The duo's ownership was quickly bought out by Warner W. Hodgdon, who ran the facility until 1986 when Hodgdon suffered financial troubles. Carrier later regained control of the facility, owning it until 1996 when Bruton Smith bought control of it. Since Smith's purchase, BMS underwent major expansion, becoming one of the largest sporting facilities in the United States.

== Description ==
=== Configuration ===
Bristol Motor Speedway (BMS) in its current form is measured at 0.533 miles (0.858 km), with the track's turns ranging from 24 degrees to 28 degrees in banking. The straightaways are banked at four degrees at the bottom and progresses up to 8 degrees at the top. When the track was initially constructed, the track had 27 degrees of banking. Before 2007, the track marketed that the track's banking was 36 degrees; this was eventually later found to be incorrect, with the true banking being 30 degrees. When the track is temporarily covered with dirt, the track uses a progressing banking system from 16 to 19 degrees. The track is also the only track left on the NASCAR schedule that utilizes two pit road lanes instead of one, combined pit road lane.

=== Amenities ===
At the time of the track's initial construction, the Knoxville News Sentinel reported the track had a capacity of 21,000, a press box, around 10,000 parking spaces, and shower rooms upon a 120-acre facility. The track has since seen mass expansion during the ownerships of Larry Carrier and Speedway Motorsports, LLC (SMI). As of 2024, the facility features a capacity of 146,000, down from its peak of 162,000. The facility also features a 30-by-63 foot television screen that hangs over the middle of the track that is named Colossus TV.

==== Adjacent drag strip ====
In 1964, plans for a drag strip were announced by then-track owner Larry Carrier and National Hot Rod Association (NHRA) officials. After a hasty construction process, the 1/4 mile (0.40 km) dragstrip was completed by May 1965. The dragstrip has gone under renovations since the 1990s, including an $18 million renovation in 1997.

== Track history ==
=== Planning and construction ===
In 1960, businessman Larry Carrier, continuing plans to expand a local recreation conglomerate within the Tri-Cities, Tennessee, area, wanted to build a race track. He drew up initial plans to build a track in Piney Flats, Tennessee, using land his real-estate agent father had bought. However, the plan was rejected by local ministers in the area. Carrier instead opted to build the track five miles south on land formerly used as a dairy farm. Carrier, with later assistance from R. G. Pope and Carl R. Moore, drew up ideas for the track on paper bags. On January 17, 1961, the three announced plans to build a 20,000-seat, 100-acre, 0.500 mi (0.805 km) track adjacent to U.S. Route 11E at a budget from $750,000 to $1,000,000. Along with the announcement, two annual NASCAR-sanctioned races were announced, with further intentions to use the track for other entertainment purposes.

Although groundbreaking on the facility was scheduled on January 23, it was delayed by poor weather for two days to the 25th. The next month, new local modified races were announced at the track. By March, the track was selling tickets, with Tennessee Ernie Ford buying the first ticket. Within same month, Carrier was able to negotiate with Washington Redskins owner George Preston Marshall to hold a National Football League (NFL) exhibition game between the Redskins and the Philadelphia Eagles after a failed attempt by Marshall to hold the game at the Charlotte Motor Speedway.

The track was met with optimism throughout Tennessee and with sports personalities. The track was praised for its layout and amenities by team owner Bud Moore, driver Cotton Owens, and Redskins public relations director Dave Slattery. The Governor of Tennessee at the time, Buford Ellington, declared a "Volunteer 500" week in the state of Tennessee. Jimmy Smyth, a writer for the Johnson City Press, praised that local residents in the Tri-Cities area now had a track nearby instead of driving hundreds of miles to another track.

=== Early years ===
The track officially opened to the public on July 23, 1961, for a paved half-mile speed record attempt by driver Tommy Morgan. Two days later, the track opened for NASCAR-sanctioned activities, with a practice session for the 1961 Volunteer 500. The next year, Carrier announced in the Bristol Virginia–Tennessean of a new recreational building near the track along with highway renovations. The track was favored in the local media by this point; the Virginia–Tennessean declared the track to be the "best" and "fastest" half-mile track in the world. The track did face difficulties; according to Carrier, the 1961 NFL game lost them $36,000. As a result of the loss, Pope left the track soon after, leaving the track to be run by Carrier and Moore.

In October 1964, the Bristol Herald Courier reported that the track was negotiating with National Hot Rod Association (NHRA) officials on building a proposed dragstrip. Two months later, the dragstrip project was officially announced by Carrier, with the facility announced to be a 27,000-seat, 1/4 mile (0.40 km) long facility built on a 500-acre plot of land at a budget of $700,000. A month after the announcement, Russ DeVault, writer for the Herald Courier, predicted that Carrier was planning to build a bigger facility that was at least 1 mile (1.6 km) long; Carrier neither denied or admitted the predicted project. In March 1965, the track announced plans to build a 2.25 miles (3.62 km) long road course that would utilize parts of the dragstrip. By May, the dragstrip was finished in time for its opening in early June. By the beginning of 1966, the track was beginning to construct the road course.

In 1969, Carrier announced a repave and reconfiguration of the track. The banking in the turns was changed to a progressive banking system from 31 to 35 degrees and the straightaways would be changed to 20 degrees, which Carrier promised would produce speeds nearing 100 miles per hour (160 km/h). The repave was completed by July of that year, and in the next major race, drivers saw average lap speeds of over 100 mph. The next year, when Carrier created the International Hot Rod Association (IHRA), he set up the association's headquarters at the track.

=== Lanny Hester and Gary Baker era ===
By the mid-1970s, Carrier wanted to focus more on his drag racing endeavors with the IHRA. On November 2, 1977, Carrier announced the sale of the track to Nashville businessmen Lanny Hester and Gary Baker for $1 million. At the time of the duo's purchase, the track had seen stagnating attendance, which the duo attributed to shortening its NASCAR races to 400 laps. Upon the track's purchase, the duo announced $200,000 worth of renovations, a rebranding to "Bristol International Raceway", an increase of purse money, and a revert to the traditional 500 lap distance for its NASCAR races. In addition, the track planned to run its first ever night race at the 1978 Volunteer 500, with temporary lights being installed for the night race. The renovations did see success, with increased attendance according to Kingsport Times writer Denny Darnell.

=== Short-lived Warner W. Hodgdon era ===
In January 1981, Baker bought out Hester's share of the track. However, just 10 months later, then-public relations manager of the track, Eddie Gossage announced that California businessman Warner W. Hodgdon bought out half of Baker's share of the track's ownership. According to Baker, while he did not initially intend on selling some of his interest, his opinion changed when Hodgdon displayed interest of buying out some of Baker's interest. With Hodgdon's investment, Hodgdon stated plans to increase the capacity of the track to 50,000. In May 1982, Baker and Hodgdon also purchased the dragstrip from Carrier. By October, according to Gossage in a letter to the editor of the Herald Courier, he claimed that Hodgdon increased capacity by 3,000, added new sewer and water lines, and expanded parking.

In July 1983, Hodgdon purchased the rest of Baker's interest in the track for $2 million, completely buying out the track. As a result of Hodgdon's purchase, Carrier was appointed to become the general manager. The next month, Carrier announced a new renovation plan over several years. However, by the late fall, staff were disgruntled; according to staff who worked with Hodgdon, he was heavily disliked. Then-public relations manager of the Hodgdon-owned Nashville Fairgrounds Speedway, Tom Roberts, had a grudge with Hodgdon, and immediately realized "I needed to be looking for another job... I looked at him as one of the biggest charlatans I had ever encountered", sharing sentiments with Gossage, who both left soon after Hodgdon bought the track.

By the end of 1984, Hodgdon faced a litany of legal issues. In November, The Tennessean's Larry Woody reported that Hodgdon was facing accusations of bid rigging in his home state of California along with his company, the National Engineering Company, facing bankruptcy. By the end of December, he was facing additional lawsuits from the North Carolina Motor Speedway and overdue payments to the Tennessee State Fair and Exposition Commission. He later failed to meet deadlines for a $102,000 payment for the Bristol track. By January 1985, the Bank of Virginia planned to put the track and the dragstrip up for auction on February 8. However, the auction was eventually scrapped when Hodgdon filed for Chapter 11 bankruptcy, requesting for protection and reorganization. Despite this, Carrier declared that the track's events for the year would still occur. NASCAR eventually confirmed Carrier's declaration in February, with Carrier being proclaimed by the Johnson City Press as the one who was able to maintain events at the track. The track also struck a five-year deal to broadcast its NASCAR races nationally on ESPN.

=== Larry Carrier's return ===
In November 1985, rumors of Kentucky businessman and drag racer Jim Ruth buying out a portion of the complex were denied by Carrier, with Carrier claiming that he was planning to buy out National Raceways, Hodgdon's company that owned the Bristol track. At the end of January 1986, Carrier's purchase was officially confirmed, paying $4.5–5 million for the company. Carrier also announced the sale of the dragstrip to Ruth to finance Carrier's purchase. With his purchase, Carrier announced further renovations, including a new 5,000-seat grandstand and new concrete walls.

The track throughout the 1980s saw increases in popularity and continued sellouts for the track, with the success of the track being remarked as "unprecedented in NASCAR racing" by The Charlotte Observer writer Tom Higgins. By the end of the decade, sellouts were guaranteed for the track months before the track's races occurred, along with the striking of a five-year renewal with ESPN. The track by this point had expanded to 50,000 seats and generated more than $138 million annually in economic revenue, with stated future intentions to build $400,000 worth of improvements. In 1989, the track also sought to expand to hold major concerts according to then-general manager Ron Scalf.

During the late 1980s and the early 1990s, the track oversaw numerous repaves. In September 1988, a $500,000 repave of the track was announced that was completed the next month. To Carrier's ire, the new surface saw increased tire wear, which Carrier blamed on how the track was resurfaced. In lieu of Carrier's anger of the new surface, he announced another repave in May 1989. The surface received complaints by drivers for the surface being too rough and bumpy. By the fall of 1991, Carrier announced a third repave. The surface still oversaw more complaints for being too bumpy, and after the 1992 Food City 500, Carrier announced another complete repave of the track. This time, Carrier opted to pave the surface in concrete instead of asphalt, which was what the track had been using since its inception. The repave was completed in July of that year.

=== Bruton Smith's purchase, expansion ===
Despite Carrier stating at the start of the 1990s that he had no intention of selling the track, sometime in the early 1990s, motorsports mogul Bruton Smith displayed interest of buying Bristol International Raceway. According to Scalf, although Carrier refused, Smith insisted on purchasing the track, stating, "everything is for sale". Within the next three weeks, Carrier, Scalf, and Smith negotiated the potential sale of the track, with the situation being described by Scalf as "where one family-owned track was basically competing with corporate America". Although Carrier stated fears to Scalf about losing NASCAR race weekends, he eventually agreed to sell off the complex with the exception of a 78-acre campground. On January 23, 1996, the sale of the track was confirmed at the cost of $26 million, with an executive for the sports marketing division of the R. J. Reynolds Tobacco Company, Jeff Byrd, replacing Scalf as general manager.

Upon the track's purchase, Smith's ownership was met with suspicion. Many local businesses and fans feared that the track could lose a NASCAR race weekend as a result of NASCAR experiencing a surge in popularity in the 1990s, with Smith having a previous record of buying or building bigger tracks and taking away race weekends from smaller tracks. The loss of a race weekend spurred fears of crippling the local Tri-Cities economy. In February 1996, Smith denied rumors of moving the track's spring race weekend to the new Texas Motor Speedway, along with announcing intentions of increasing capacity to 120,000, an increase from 81,000 from when Smith bought it. Initial renovations started in March, with further plans for expansion and events being announced by Byrd. The track was also renamed "Bristol Motor Speedway" within the month. By the end of the year, Byrd estimated the track had spent $20 million in renovations, with more renovations being announced in November. By April 1997, the track surpassed Neyland Stadium as the largest sports arena in Tennessee by capacity. The track continued to oversee further expansion in the late 1990s and early 2000s. In 1999, the track constructed the Kulwicki Tower, which was completed by 2000 and increased capacity by 12,000 seats to 147,000. In 2000 and 2001, the track held its first dirt races on a temporary dirt surface; however, the races were scrapped after 2001 due to issues with lengthy cleanups.

==== Track changes, short-lived dirt racing ====
In 2002, the track expanded further; the track built a new pedestrian tunnel that connected the grandstands to the infield, along with stated plans to expand seating. In August, the seating expansion was officially confirmed, with an intent to expand to 160,000. In 2006, the track officially announced a repave of its track surface; however, the repave was later rescheduled to occur in 2007. By the time the new variable-banking system was complete in August, the turns varied from 24 to 30 degrees, with the racing surface being widened from 40 to 43 feet.

The track repave saw criticism for removing the one-lane and rough style racing Bristol became reputable for; criticism became so prevalent that an ashamed Byrd was stated to have repeated "y'all, we're sorry" to fans leaving the track after the 2008 Sharpie 500. In 2010, the track saw its streak of 55 consecutive sellouts for its NASCAR races end. In October of that year, after Byrd died in October, the track promoted its vice president of corporate sales, Jerry Caldwell, to become the track's general manager. Two years later, in response to both fan criticism along with Smith's stated displeasure with the progressive banking system, the track announced the elimination of the progressive banking system. In October 2015, the track announced the construction of Colossus TV, a 30-by-63 foot television screen that was touted as the world's largest "outdoor, permanent, center-hung digital display". Construction on the screen started in November and was completed in April 2016. In that same year, the track began applying PJ1 TrackBite, a traction compound, on the track's lower groove in an attempt to artificially create multi-groove racing.

== Events ==
=== Racing ===
==== NASCAR ====
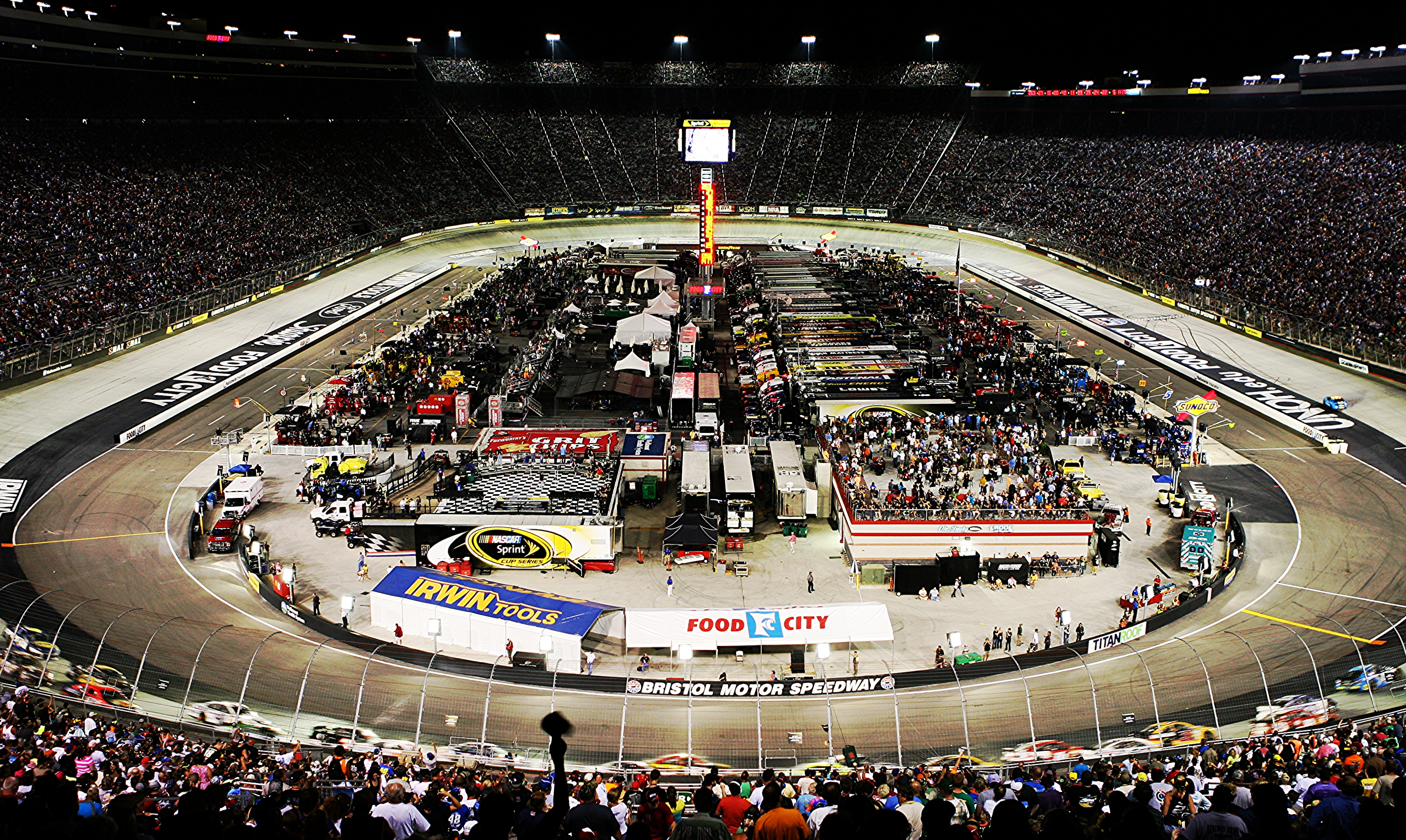
The Bristol night race in 2013. The track's fall NASCAR race was first run at night in 1978, and has since become an annual tradition.

Bristol Motor Speedway hosts two annual NASCAR weekends: The NASCAR Cup Series with the Food City 500 and the Bass Pro Shops Night Race. The Food City 500 was first held on October 22, 1961. In 2020, to address declining attendance, track officials announced the race would be run on a temporary dirt surface, with the truck Series also competing on dirt. After three years, the event returned to its original concrete surface. The Bass Pro Shops Night Race, first held on July 30, 1961, was the track's first major event. In 1978, the race transitioned to a nighttime format.

In addition to its Cup Series events, the track also hosts lower national divisions NASCAR O'Reilly Auto Parts Series and NASCAR Truck Series races as support races for the Cup Series. In 2020, BMS held a one-off edition of the NASCAR All-Star Race, which moved to Texas Motor Speedway the following season.

==== Other racing events ====
- BMS hosted the fifth round of the 2013 Global Rallycross Championship, with Toomas Heikkinen winning the event.
- From 2022 to 2023, YouTuber Lawrence Garrett Mitchell, known by his alias Cleetus McFarland, held Cleetus and Cars, an annual car festival that also holds races.

=== Other sporting events ===
==== American football games ====
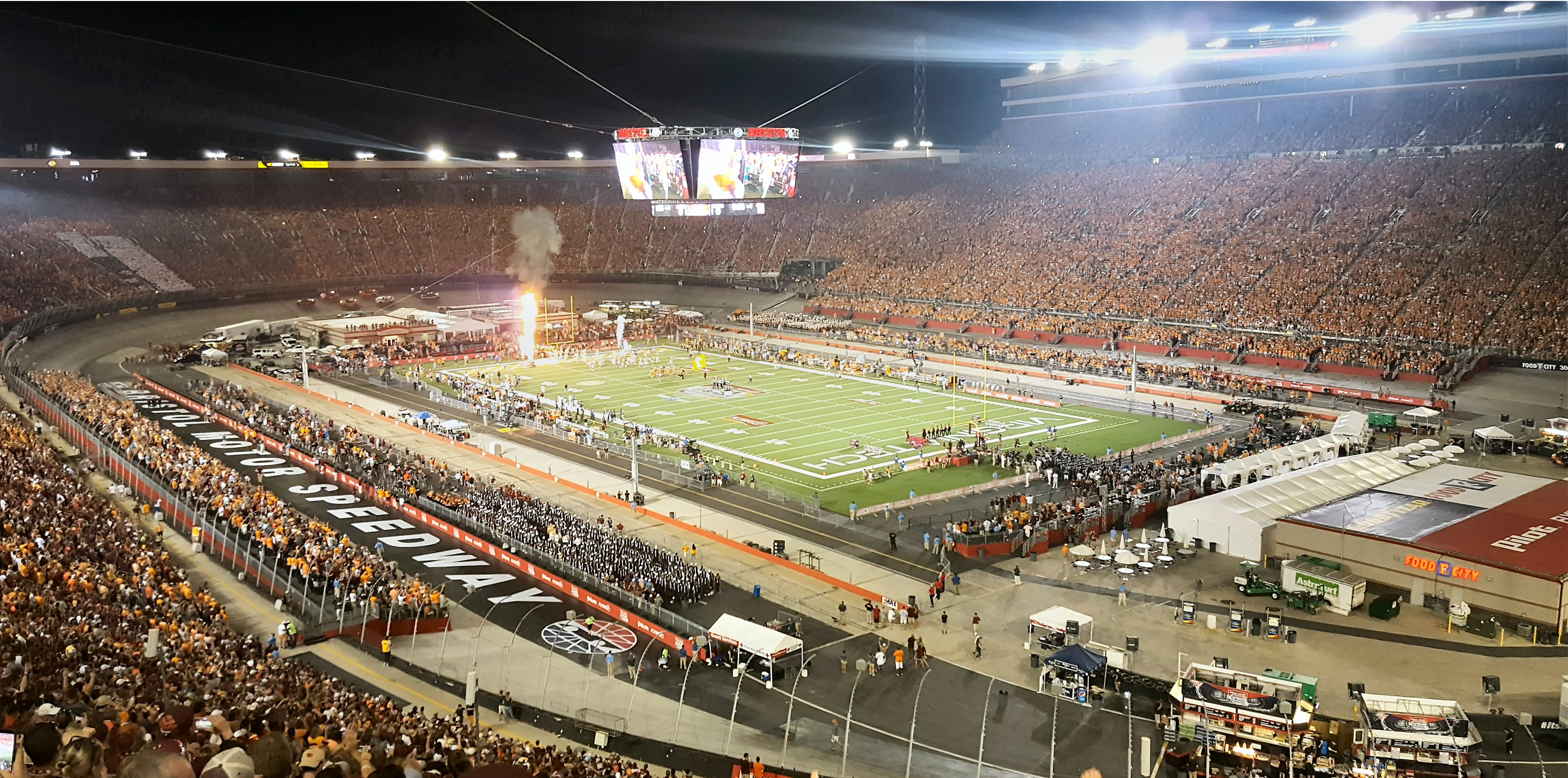
The Battle at Bristol between the Tennessee Volunteers and Virginia Tech Hokies on September 10, 2016.

On various occasions, the track has held American gridiron football games at varying levels. In 1961, the track hosted an exhibition National Football League (NFL) game between the Washington Redskins and the Philadelphia Eagles after an initial failed attempt to host an event at Charlotte Motor Speedway. The Redskins won by a score of 17-10.

In 2013, an NCAA Division I FBS game called the Battle at Bristol was officially announced for the track between the Tennessee Volunteers and the Virginia Tech Hokies, to take place in 2016. The game took place on September 10, with the Volunteers winning by a score of 45-24.

A week after the Battle at Bristol, the track played host to another football game, this time for an NCAA Division I FCS game between the East Tennessee State Buccaneers and the Western Carolina Catamounts. East Tennessee State won by a score of 34-31.

==== Baseball games ====
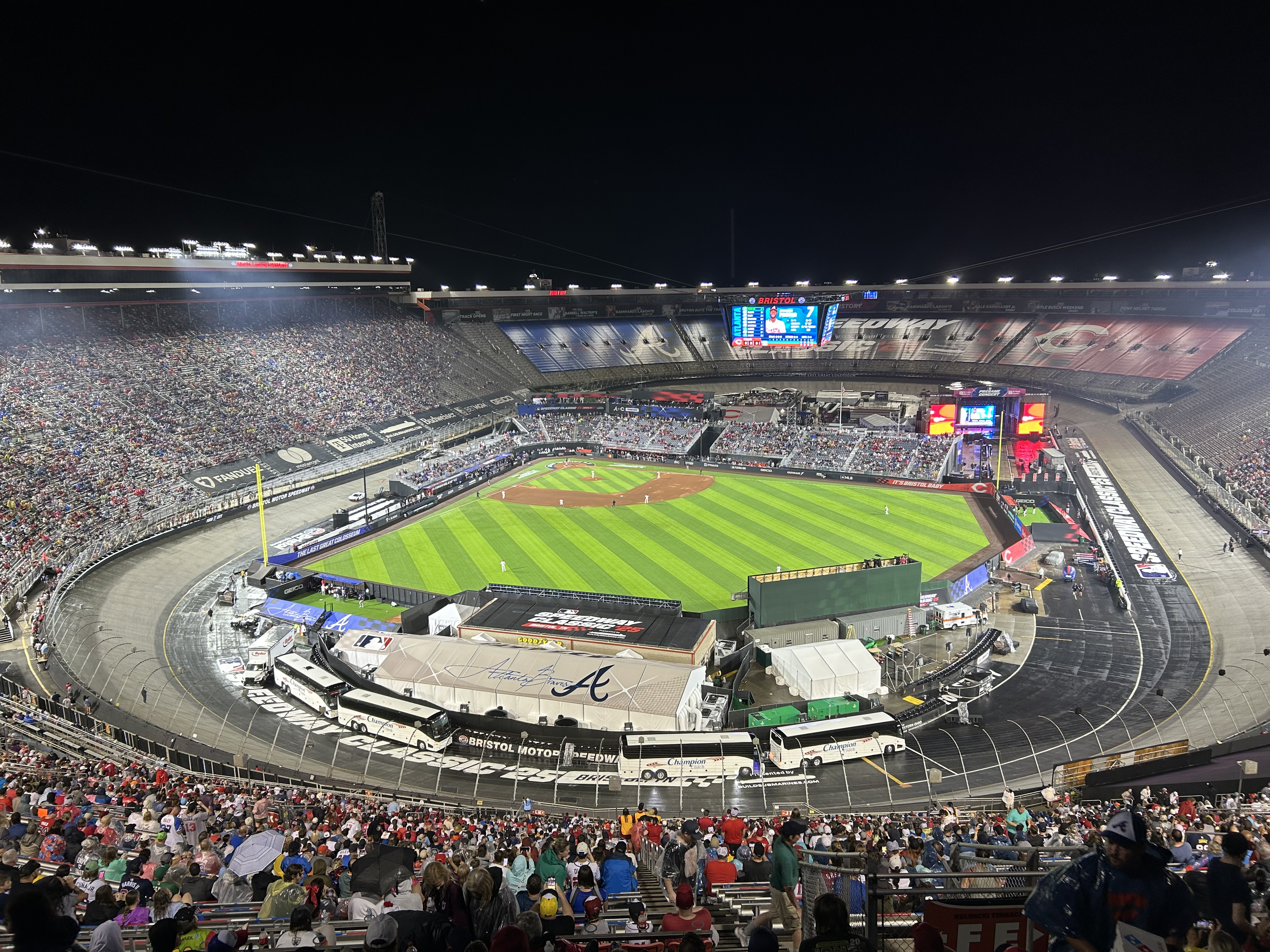
The first pitch of the MLB Speedway Classic '25

Bristol Motor Speedway held a Major League Baseball game between the Atlanta Braves and Cincinnati Reds from August 2-3, 2025, which was the first regular-season MLB game played in the state of Tennessee. The Braves won the game, 4–2.

=== Other events and uses ===
The track on numerous occasions has served as a facility to assist the general public in a variety of situations. In 2002, the track acted as a temporary high school for students at Sullivan East High School when their school was closed due to a black mold infestation. In the early 2010s, Remote Area Medical held a medical clinic at the track. The track has been used as an evacuee center for several hurricanes, including Hurricane Irma in 2017, Hurricane Florence in 2018, and Hurricane Dorian in 2019. The track has also been used as a COVID-19 vaccine distribution center.

In 1968, the track served as a campaign rally for longtime Alabama Governor George Wallace for his campaign in the 1968 United States presidential election. In 2021, YouTuber Jimmy Donaldson, known by his alias MrBeast, held a game of tag between 10 people at the track with a purse of $500,000 given to the winner.

== Lap records ==
As of September 2025, the fastest official race lap records at Bristol Motor Speedway are listed as:

Category	Time	Driver	Vehicle	Event
Oval (1961–present): 0.533 mi (0.858 km)
NASCAR Cup	0:14.945	Kyle Larson	Chevrolet Camaro ZL1	2018 Food City 500
NASCAR Truck	0:15.350	Christian Eckes	Chevrolet Silverado	2023 UNOH 200
ARCA Menards	0:15.478	Brent Crews	Toyota Camry	2025 Bush's Beans 200
NASCAR Xfinity	0:15.650	Cole Custer	Ford Mustang	2019 Alsco 300
Late model	0:16.574	Stewart Friesen	Late model	2021 Bristol Throwdown
Temporary Dirt Oval (2020–2023): 0.533 mi (0.858 km)
NASCAR Truck	0:19.003	Stewart Friesen	Toyota Tundra NASCAR	2021 Pinty's Truck Race on Dirt
NASCAR Cup	0:19.261	Kyle Larson	Chevrolet Camaro ZL1	2022 Food City Dirt Race
