= Shard Villa =

Historic house in Vermont, United States

- U.S. National Register of Historic Places
- U.S. Historic district
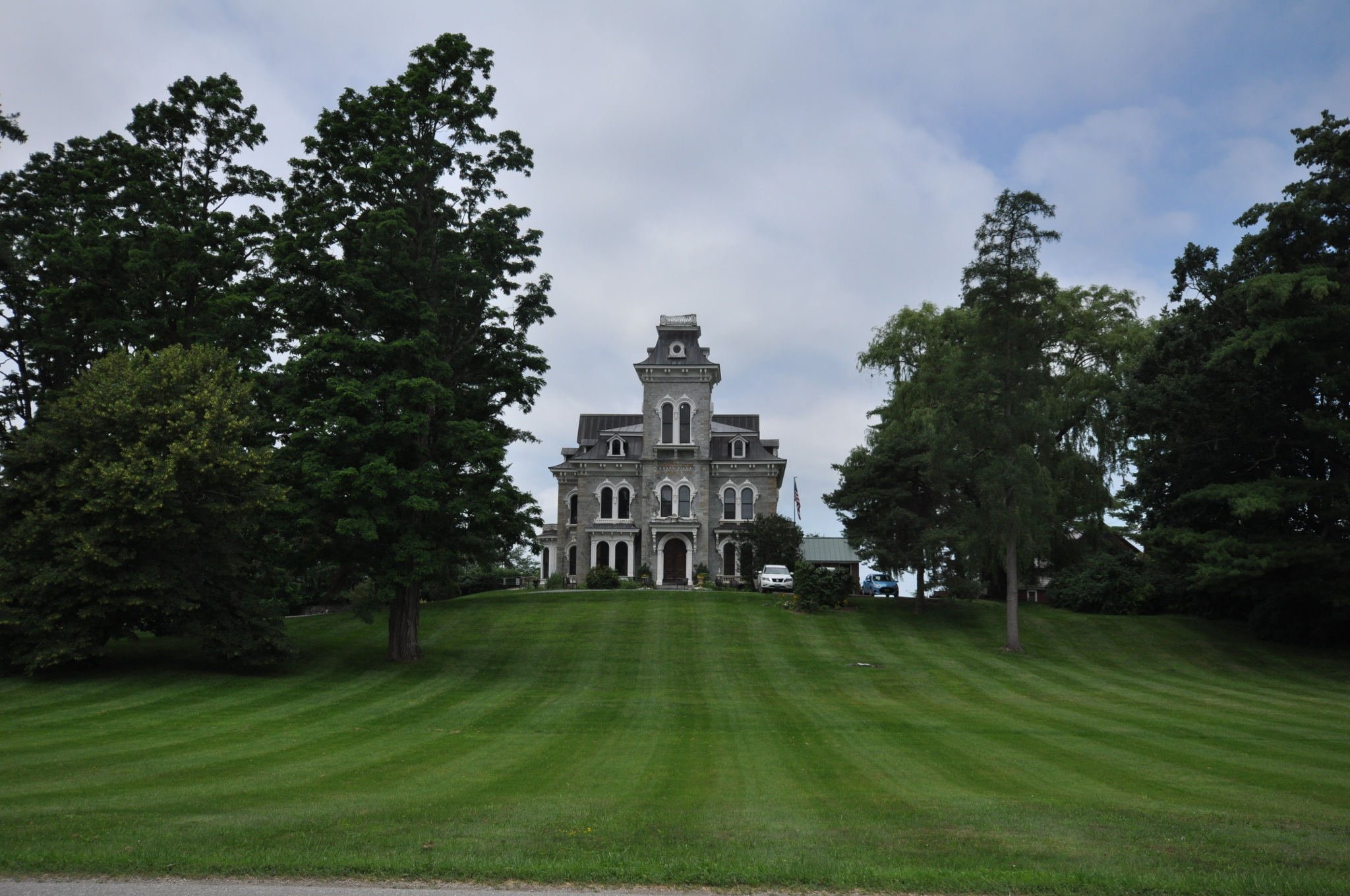

- Location within Vermont Location within the United States
- Location: Jct. Shard Villa and Columbus Smith Rds., Salisbury, Vermont
- Coordinates: 43°56′22″N 73°9′13″W
- Area: 4.3 acres (1.7 ha)
- Built: 1872
- Architect: Thayer, Warren; Et al.
- Architectural style: Second Empire
- NRHP reference No.: 89001789
- Added to NRHP: October 30, 1989

Shard Villa is a historic house at Shard Villa and Columbus Smith Roads in Salisbury, Vermont, USA. Built in 1872, it is an elaborate and sophisticated example of Second Empire architecture, built by Columbus Smith, a prominent international lawyer. It was listed on the National Register of Historic Places in 1989. The property has been used for many years as an elderly care facility and is one of the oldest such facilities in continuous operation in the state.

== Description and history ==
Shard Villa stands in a rural area of northwestern Salisbury, just west of the junction of Shard Villa and Columbus Smith Roads. Standing on over 4 acres (1.6 ha), a portion of a once larger country estate, are a cluster of buildings, including the main house, carriage barn, dairy barn, horse barn and smokehouse. On a height of land north of the house stands a mausoleum, the family burial site of Columbus Smith and members of his family. The house is a 2 1/2-story limestone structure, with a full third floor under its mansard roof. Its most prominent feature is the three-story mansarded tower at the center of the east-facing front facade, topped by a low balustrade and featuring projecting small round windows in the flared mansard roof. Windows are paired round-arch one-over-one sash, with elaborate moulded surrounds that only slightly break the facade's symmetry The interior has elaborate woodwork and fixtures and is decorated with murals painted by the Italian artist Silvio Pezzoli. A 20th-century brick ell extends behind the original main block.

The property was developed as a country estate beginning in 1872 by Columbus Smith, a lawyer renowned at the time for his experience in international inheritance law. It was the first major commission of the Burlington architect Warren Thayer, with exterior detailing by Clinton G. Smith, another prominent regional builder-architect. The estate was landscaped by Robert Morris Copeland, an early landscape architect, although only some elements of his original design now survive. The house design is similar to Plate 19 of Woodward and Thompson's Woodward's National Architect, published in 1869. The interior murals were commissioned by Smith in 1886, with the artist, Silvio Pezzoli, brought over from Italy to live in the villa while creating them.

The name of the villa derives from Columbus Smith's first major international client, the family of Frances Mary Shard, a Vermont native who married a wealthy Englishman, and whose only surviving heirs were a family from nearby Ripton. In 1922, the property was adapted for use as an elderly care facility, at which time the brick addition was made to the rear of the main house.

== See also ==
- National Register of Historic Places listings in Addison County, Vermont
