= True Value 500 =

There have been two different races in racing history called the True Value 500:

- One held at Pocono Raceway for USAC Champ Cars in 1980, for which see Pocono 500 (Indycar)
- Two held at Texas Motor Speedway for Indy Racing League cars in 1997 and 1998, for which see Firestone 550
