= Congregational Church of Ludlow =

Historic church in Vermont, United States

- U.S. National Register of Historic Places
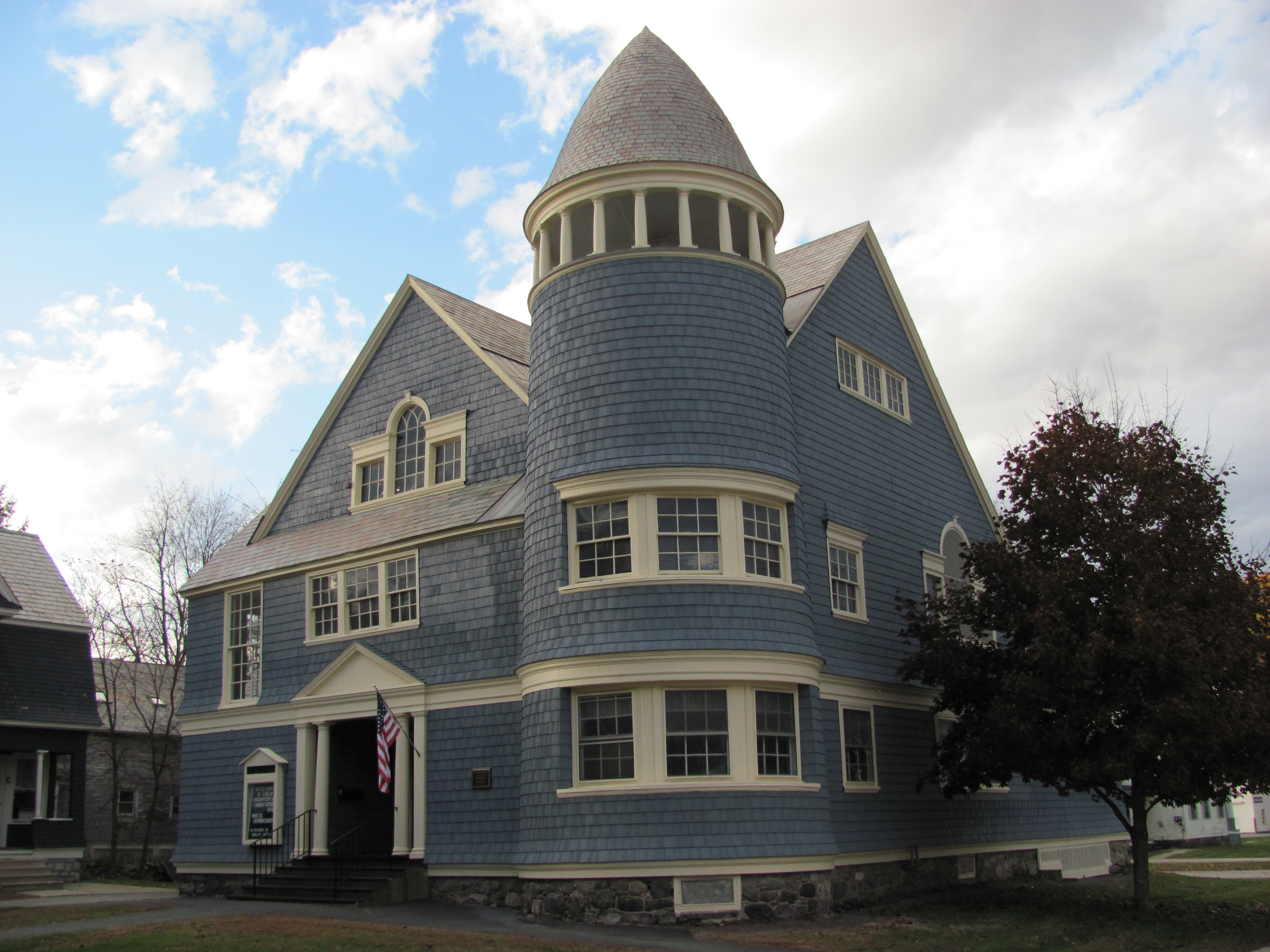

- Location within Vermont Location within the United States
- Location: 48 Pleasant St., Ludlow Village, Vermont
- Coordinates: 43°23′49″N 72°41′50″W
- Area: less than one acre
- Built: 1891
- Built by: Smith, Clinton F.
- Architect: Hapgood, Edward T.
- Architectural style: Shingle Style
- MPS: Religious Buildings, Sites and Structures in Vermont MPS
- NRHP reference No.: 03001541
- Added to NRHP: January 28, 2004

The United Church of Ludlow, formerly the Congregational Church of Ludlow, is a historic church at 48 Pleasant Street in the village of Ludlow in Vermont. Built in 1891, it is one of the only churches in the state built in a fully mature expression of Shingle Style architecture. Its Congregationalist congregation was organized in 1806, and in 1930 it merged with a Methodist congregation to form a union congregation. The church was listed on the National Register of Historic Places in 2004.

== Description and history ==
The United Church of Ludlow is located on the south side of Ludlow village, in a densely built residential area, at the northwest corner of Pleasant and Elm Streets. It is a 2 1/2-story wood-frame structure, with a slate roof, shingled exterior, and mortared fieldstone foundation. It is basically rectangular, with a slightly projecting cross gable on the long sides giving it a cross shape. A circular tower at the southeast corner of the cross rises to a colonnaded open belfry, topped by a bellcast shingled roof. The main entrance faces Pleasant Street, recessed in an opening flanked in antis by Tuscan columns. The interior of the church retains many original features.

The First Congregational Church of Ludlow was organized in 1806, and first met in private homes. Its first meeting house was built the following year, and was replaced by a second in 1839. This church, its third sanctuary, was built in 1891–92 to a design by New York City architect Edward T. Hapgood. It is believed to be the only full expression of the Shingle style in religious architecture in the state, other examples either including features from earlier styles (the Queen Anne and Stick styles) or later periods (the Colonial Revival). The cost of the design work was donated by Donald Heald, a noted advocate of fire-resistant construction; it is thus unusual that a wood-frame building (originally with a roof of wooden shingles) was proposed. The congregation merged in 1930 with the local Methodist congregation to form the United Church of Ludlow, which now owns and maintains the property.

== See also ==
- National Register of Historic Places listings in Windsor County, Vermont
