= PJ1 TrackBite =

Traction compound

PJ1 TrackBite (formerly known as VHT TrackBite or simply VHT) is a custom formulated synthetic resin, typically black in color, used in drag racing to either increase the traction of a car's tires or as a sealer for newly ground and/or resurfaced race tracks. It stays sticky for weeks, has fire-retardant properties, and is hydrophobic. It has been used in professional racing since 1972.

The TrackBite that the National Hot Rod Association uses is yellowish in color and is diluted with methanol for optimal effect.

The compound originated as a high temperature coating made for NASA by the Sperex Corporation. VHT, a brand owned by Sperex, began offering it for sale commercially. It was taken up by drag racers, and Sperex soon began producing formulations specially made for the sport. Sperex was purchased in 1989 by businessman P. J. Harvey and is now part of PJH Brands.

== PJ1 in non-drag racing applications ==
Oval tracks also use TrackBite to provide extra traction in the corners of what would otherwise be a "one groove racetrack".

Its use was prohibited by NASCAR in 2010 to reduce the amount of chemicals used at its events. However, it was used at Bristol Motor Speedway in 2016, 2017, and 2018. Due to its frequent use in recent years at Bristol, TrackBite is often called "Bristol Bite." At Bristol it is used on the bottom of the track in an attempt to restore racing in the bottom groove that has been lost with changes to the banking in 2007 and 2012. Bristol and Charlotte both have regular TrackBite treatment trucks for their drag strips to prepare their tracks for their regular NHRA regional events along with their national events. Bristol's concrete surface uses the treatment similarly to the launch pad for the drag strip, which is concrete.

For IndyCar, PJ1 causes various problems on the racetrack. The combination of lighter vehicles, harder tire compounds, and PJ1 results in less grip. Since the racing drivers avoid surfaces with PJ1 during the race, marbles from tire wear collect there. This leads to a slippery lane. In the IndyCar races of 2019, 2020, and 2021 at Texas Motor Speedway, this resulted in incidents attributable to PJ1.

Formula One had an issue at the 2012 German Grand Prix with PJ1. Drivers were consistently using the treated sections of the Sudkurve, which doubles as the launch pad for the drag strip at Hockenheimring, to gain traction. That led to sandblasting of the circuit to remove the PJ1. The Fédération Internationale de l'Automobile was forced to cancel championship status of the European Drag Racing Championship round at Hockenheimring as professional categories were having issues with the cleaned circuit, even after it was reprepped. At the 2019 German Grand Prix, rain during the race led to numerous incidents when drivers slipped and crashed after running into the slick, PJ1-treated part of Hockenheim, including Lewis Hamilton, Nico Hülkenberg, Charles Leclerc and Carlos Sainz.

The following tracks used or are still using PJ1:

- Bristol Motor Speedway (2016)
- Charlotte Motor Speedway (2017)
- New Hampshire Motor Speedway (2017)
- Michigan International Speedway (2019)
- Texas Motor Speedway (2019)
- Pocono Raceway (2019)
- Phoenix Raceway (2021)
