= The Heights: Anatomy of a Skyscraper =

2011 non-fiction book by Kate Ascher

- Author: Kate Ascher
- Language: English
- Subject: Architecture, skyscrapers
- Genre: Non-fiction
- Published: 2011
- Publisher: Penguin Books
- Publication place: United States

The Heights: Anatomy of a Skyscraper is a 2011 non-fiction book written by Kate Ascher.

== Overview ==
A guide into the ways skyscrapers are made and work.

== Critical reception ==
The New York Times," In this lushly illustrated book, Ms. Ascher meticulously and lucidly deconstructs the design of manmade towers from the foundation on up to the imperatives of physical and psychological security in a terror-conscious society."

The National, "The Heights is a fascinating tome, as comfortable telling us how tall buildings withstand wind as it is detailing the intricate history of tall buildings and their social impact."
