= The Heights (Middlebury, Vermont) =

Historic house in Vermont, United States

- U.S. National Register of Historic Places
- U.S. Historic district
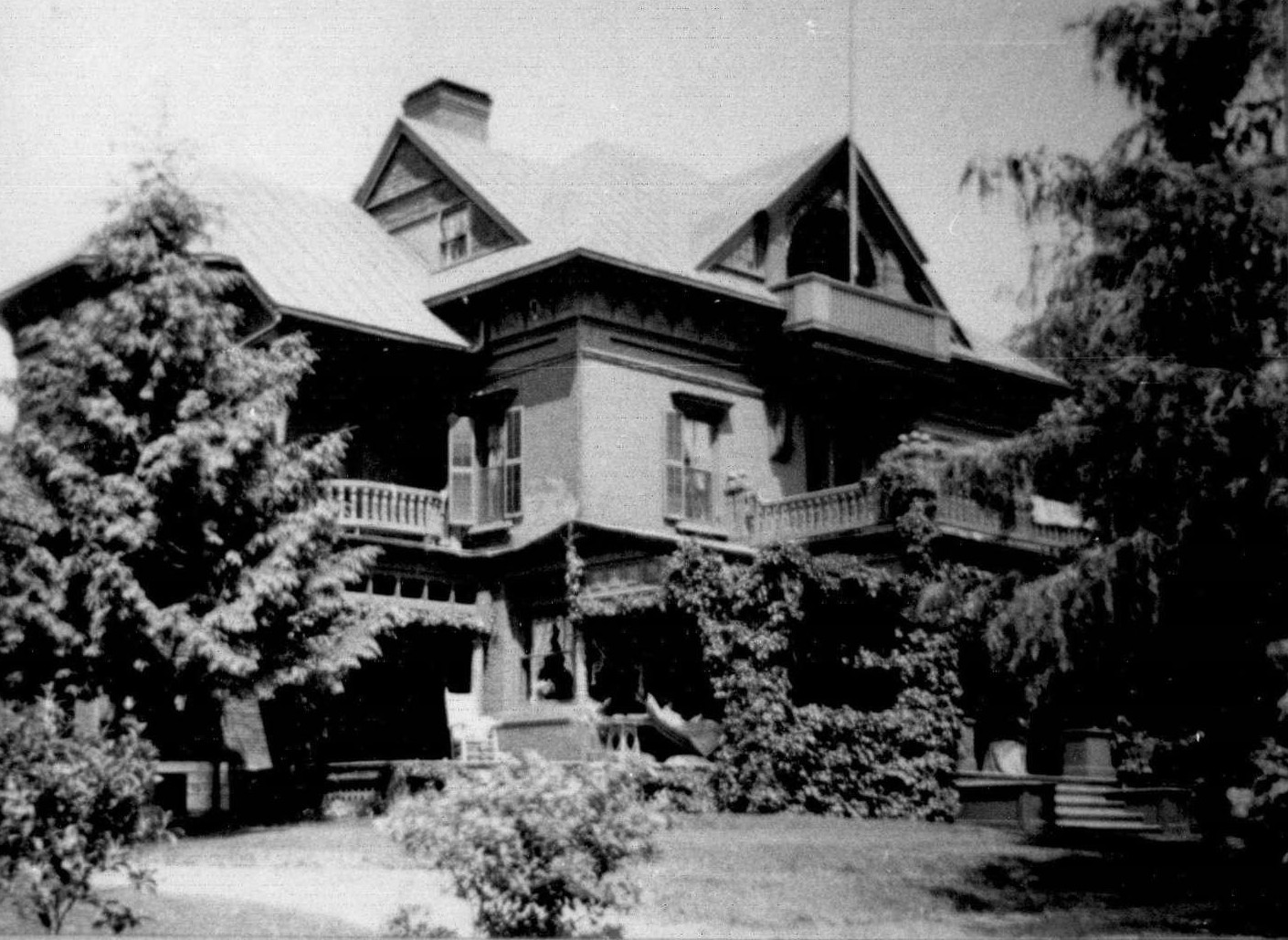
- c. 1900 photograph

- Location within Vermont Location within the United States
- Location: South St./VT 30, Middlebury, Vermont
- Coordinates: 44°0′18″N 73°10′54″W
- Area: 40 acres (16 ha)
- Built: 1870
- Architect: Clinton Smith
- Architectural style: Italianate, Queen Anne
- NRHP reference No.: 88003082
- Added to NRHP: December 29, 1988

The Heights, also known as the Thaddeus Chapman House, is a historic country estate on Vermont Route 30 (South Street) in Middlebury, Vermont. Developed in the 1870s and 1880s, the property is one of the finest estates of the period in the state. It was listed on the National Register of Historic Places in 1988.

== Description and history ==
The Heights is located on the southwestern outskirts of the village of Middlebury, beyond the main campus of Middlebury College and West Cemetery, on the west side of Vermont Route 30 opposite the college's athletic complex. It was developed beginning in 1870 by Thaddeus Chapman, a prominent local businessman in the lumber industry. The 40-acre (16 ha) estate is lined at the road with trees and a hedgerow, with a long tree-lined drive angling westward toward the main house. Meadows extend on either side of the drive, and the rear portion of the estate is wooded, with the central area near the house more formally designed. In addition to the main house, there are a number of period outbuildings, including a carriage barn, children's playhouse, springhouse, and gas house. Northwest of the house is a terraced sunken garden.

The main house is a large 2 1/2-story brick building, built in 1870 and significantly restyled in 1887 to designs by the noted local architect Clinton Smith. Its exterior and interior are both richly decorated in the then-fashionable Queen Anne style. The playhouse, about 100 feet (30 m) north of the house, is a modest single-story wood-frame structure, built by Thaddeus Chapman for his daughters about 1887. The carriage barn is a multisection structure, its oldest portion dating to 1870, that originally held spaces for horses and carriages, and was later expanded to include a garage and shed.

== See also ==
- National Register of Historic Places listings in Addison County, Vermont
