= Middlebury Center Historic District =

Historic district in Connecticut, United States

- U.S. National Register of Historic Places
- U.S. Historic district
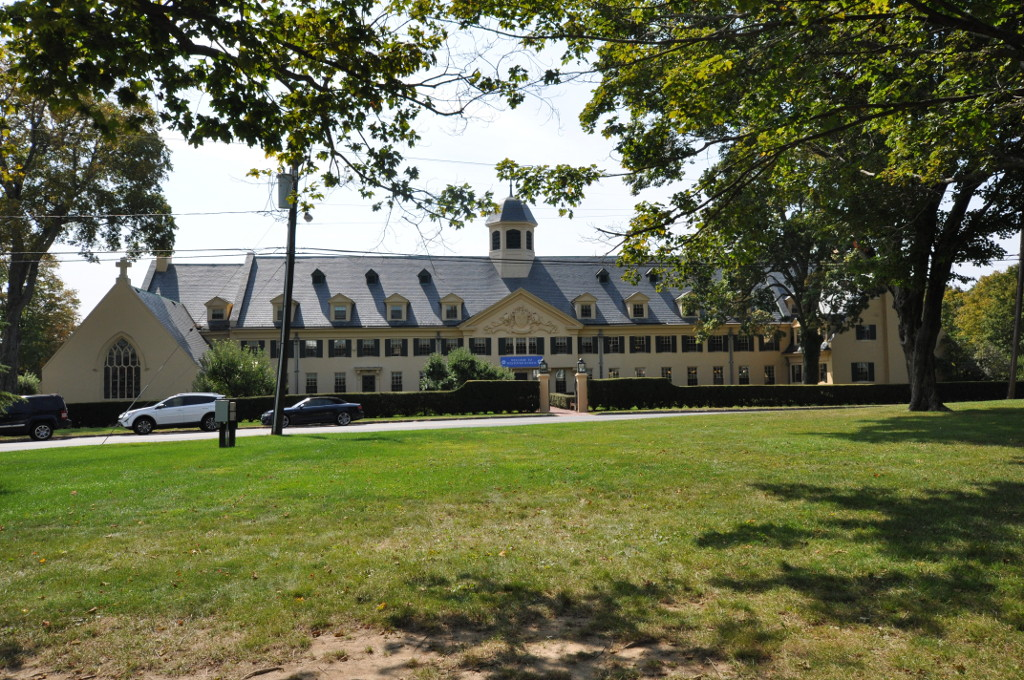
- The Westover School

- Location within Connecticut Location within the United States
- Location: Roughly bounded by Library Road, North and South Streets, and Whittemore Road CT 188 Middlebury, Connecticut
- Coordinates: 41°31′35″N 73°7′33″W
- Area: 103 acres (42 ha)
- NRHP reference No.: 85001019
- Added to NRHP: May 9, 1985

The Middlebury Center Historic District encompasses the historic civic and religious center of Middlebury, Connecticut. Centered at the Junction of North and South Streets with Whittemore Road CT 188, the District includes churches, schools and municipal buildings, many from the late 19th or early 20th centuries, as well as a diversity of residential architecture. The district includes all the residences along the entire length of North Street, which leads up to the town green. The district was listed on the National Register of Historic Places in 1985.

== Description and history ==
Middlebury was settled in the early 18th century, but did not begin achieving an independent identity until 1790, when a congregational parish was authorized. It was incorporated in 1807, its land taken from surrounding towns. The town remained an agricultural area, lacking waterpower for industrial development and transport, and bypassed by the railroads. The town center arose at a junction of multiple roadways, where the first Congregational church was built, and in its early years included services such as a blacksmith and tavern. Due to its quiet rural nature, there has been little residential development in the center since 1840, with many of its civic and religious buildings added later, some as replacements for earlier structures.

The oldest surviving building in the district is an 18th-century house, now on the grounds of the Westover School, whose campus is a major feature of the center. The oldest church in the district is the Greek Revival Methodist Church, built in 1832, although the 1935 Congregational Church is a reproduction of an 1845 Greek Revival building lost to fire. The adjacent town hall, a brick neo-Federalist brick building, was also built in 1935, the previous one having succumbed in the same fire. The Catholic St. John of the Cross Church, designed by architect John J. Dwyer of Hartford and dedicated in 1908, is a fine example of Colonial Revival architecture.

== See also ==
- National Register of Historic Places listings in New Haven County, Connecticut
