= HT =

HT, Ht, hT, or ht may refer to:

== Businesses and organisations ==
- Hizb ut-Tahrir, an Islamic political organisation
- Hrvatski Telekom, a Croatian telecom company
- HaparandaTornio Bandy or HT Bandy, a Swedish-Finnish bandy club
- HT Media, Indian news media company
  - Hindustan Times, newspaper owned by HT Media
- The TA airline designator of several airlines
  - Aeromist-Kharkiv
  - Air Horizont
  - Tianjin Air Cargo
- HelloTalk, a language learning platform

== Science and technology ==
=== Medicine ===
- Hematocrit, Ht, a blood test that measures the volume percentage of red blood cells

=== Electronics and computing ===
- HT (vacuum tube), the high-tension power supply for vacuum tube circuits
- Handie-Talkie, a Motorola portable radio transceiver
- Handheld transceiver or walkie-talkie
- Horizontal tab, a control character in several character sets
- Hyper-threading (HT or HTT), Intel name for multithreading
- HyperTransport, computer processor interconnection technology

=== Other uses in science and technology ===
- Hectotesla (hT), an SI unit of magnetic flux density
- HT, a type of mustard gas

== Other uses ==
- Haiti (ISO 3166-1 alpha-2 country code)
  - .ht, Internet country code for Haiti
- Haitian Creole language (ISO 639 alpha-2 code)
- Hat tip, "HT", "H/T" or "h/t", one form of acknowledging online someone who brought something to the author's attention
- Hull Maintenance Technician, abbreviated HT, a US Navy occupational rating
- Hammer throw, in track and field

== See also ==
- HTS (disambiguation)
