= Amy Height =

American actress (1866 - 1913)

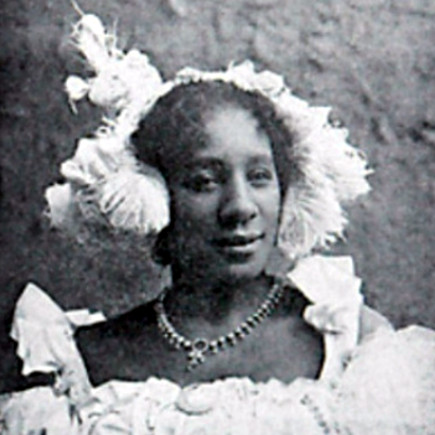
- Born: c. 1866; Boston, Massachusetts
- Died: 21 March 1913; Camberwell
- Occupation: entertainer

Amy Height (c. 1866 – 21 March 1913) was an American music hall entertainer in the UK. She was an unusual black actor and comedian who introduced herself to British audiences first in pantomime and also in straight theatre.

== Life ==
Height was born in Boston, Massachusetts, around 1866. In 1886, she was acting in Barnsley in northern England. In 1883 she was in the pantomime Robinson Crusoe as his "squaw", Topsy. The critics favourably described her powerful singing voice and her comic delivery.

She became a music-hall entertainer in the UK. She appeared with banjoists James and George Bohee who were African Americans on their British tour in 1888 and she was still singing soprano semi-comic songs for them in 1889. She was an unusual black actor who introduced herself to British audiences first in pantomime and also in straight theatre. She was described a "beautiful octaroon" when in Cardiff who was "the only" black female music hall actor. This is not likely. Roles were created for black actors by the popularity of Uncle Tom's Cabin. In 1894 she appeared as the slave, Aunt Chloe, in a dramatic version of Uncle Tom's Cabin. She shared top billing with George Robey in one pantomime and her fame was such that impersonators targeted her along with other leading actors. She took a leading role in The Gay Grisette that went on a British tour and the New York Times wrote about her success as a "Negro Mammy".

Height appeared in several British censuses with inconclusive and fictional entries. In 1891 she was in Lambeth when she was allegedly a thirty year old theatrical singer who had been born in New York. Ten years later she was in Swansea on census night and she was still thirty years old and born "in America". By 1911 her age had been reduced to 29 and she was now recorded as born in Boston.

She died of pneumonia in 1913 after appearing in Pantomime earlier that year. Height died in hospital in Camberwell - when her age was now given as 46.
