= HTS Teologiese Studies =

- Discipline: Theology
- Language: Afrikaans; English
- Edited by: Andries van Aarde

Publication details
- History: 1942–present
- Publisher: AOSIS (South Africa)
- Frequency: Triannually
- Open access: Yes

Standard abbreviations
- ISO 4: HTS Teol. Stud.

Indexing
- ISSN: 0259-9422 (print); 2072-8050 (web)
- LCCN: 87649086

Links
- Journal homepage; Online access; Online archive

HTS Teologiese Studies/Theological Studies in Afrikaans; previously also known as Hervormde Teologiese Studies) is a peer-reviewed academic journal covering interfaith theological research. It has a broad scope, publishing on aspects of religious studies, philosophy, ancient languages, practical theology, sociology, and ethics. In 2009, the journal Practical Theology in South Africa was merged into Theological Studies, which became an official journal of the Society for Practical Theology in South Africa.

The journal is abstracted and indexed in the Arts and Humanities Citation Index, Scopus, and SciELO.

== See also ==
- Open access in South Africa
