= List of nature centers in Vermont =

Vermont Nature Centers (Hover mouse over pog to popup clickable link)

This is a list of nature centers and environmental education centers in the state of Vermont.

To use the sortable tables: click on the icons at the top of each column to sort that column in alphabetical order; click again for reverse alphabetical order.

Name	Location	County	Region	Summary
Birds of Vermont Museum	Huntington	Chittenden	Burlington Metro	100-acre bird sanctuary, displays almost 500 bird woodcarvings created by Bob Spear, a Vermont naturalist and master woodcarver
Bonnyvale Environmental Education Center	West Brattleboro	Windham	Southern	website, 100 acres with 2 miles of trails
Branbury State Park	Salisbury	Addison	West Central	69 acres, center open seasonally
Brighton State Park	Island Pond	Essex	Northeast Kingdom	Center open seasonally
Burton Island State Park	St. Albans Bay	Franklin	Burlington Metro	253 acres, accessible only by boat, park and center open seasonally
Button Bay State Park	Vergennes	Addison	West Central	253 acres, center open seasonally
Coolidge State Park	Plymouth	Windsor	Southern	Recreation centerpiece of the 21,500-acre Calvin Coolidge State Forest, park and center open seasonally
ECHO, Leahy Center for Lake Champlain	Burlington	Chittenden	Burlington Metro	Natural history, maritime history and ecology of Lake Champlain, features lake aquarium displays
Green Mountain Audubon Center	Huntington	Chittenden	Burlington Metro	website, 255 acres, operated by Audubon Vermont
Groton Nature Center	Groton	Caledonia	Northeast Kingdom	Located in Groton State Forest, over 26,000 acres, center open seasonally
Hazen's Notch Association	Montgomery	Franklin	Green Mountains	website, conservation, education and trails in the Hazen's Notch area
Keewaydin Environmental Education Center	Salisbury	Addison	West Central	website, residential environmental education programs
Jamaica State Park	Jamaica	Windham	Southern	772 acres, park and center open seasonally
Lake Carmi State Park	Enosburg Falls	Franklin	Burlington Metro	482 acres, park and center open seasonally
Lamoille County Nature Center	Morristown	Lamoille	North Central	website, 40 acres, operated by the Lamoille County Conservation District
Little River State Park	Waterbury	Washington	Central	Park and center open seasonally, located on the 850-acre Waterbury Reservoir
Mad River Glen	Fayston	Washington	Central	Features the Kent Thomas Nature Center with nature history exhibits and environmental education programs
Montshire Museum of Science	Norwich	Windsor	Southern	Natural history and science exhibits, outdoor and water exhibits, 100 acres
The Nature Museum at Grafton	Grafton	Windham	Southern	website, exhibits about area plants, animals, and geology, operates the Bellows Falls Fish Ladder Visitor Center in the summer
North Branch Nature Center	Montpelier	Washington	Central	website, 28 acres
NorthWoods Stewardship Center	East Charleston	Orleans	Northeast Kingdom	website, 1,500 acres, educational, research and conservation service organization
One World Conservation Center	Bennington	Bennington	Southern	website, 96 acres
Shelburne Farms	Shelburne	Chittenden	Burlington Metro	1,400-acre working farm, 10 miles of trails, children's farmyard, historic farm buildings, farm and environmental programs
Southern Vermont Natural History Museum	Marlboro	Windham	Southern	600 acres, natural history exhibits on minerals and geology, native animals, live birds of prey, amphibians, reptiles and native fish species
Vermont Institute of Natural Science	Quechee	Windsor	Southern	Features live raptor enclosures, bird programs, songbird aviary, interactive, natural science exhibits, wildlife rehabilitation facility

== Resources ==
- Vermont Education and Environment Network
