= Burton Island State Park =

Island in the United States of America

- Location within Vermont
- Interactive map of Burton Island State Park
- Location: St. Albans, Vermont, United States
- Coordinates: 44°46′24″N 73°12′18″W
- Area: 253 acres (102 ha)
- Established: 1964
- Administrator: Vermont Department of Forests, Parks, and Recreation
- Open: Friday of Memorial Day weekend through Labor Day weekend
- Website: Official website
- Vermont State Parks

Burton Island State Park is a state park in northwest Vermont, United States. The park comprises Burton Island, an island of 253 acres (102 ha) and located off St. Albans Point in Lake Champlain, close to the International Boundary with Canada. The park is administered by the Vermont Department of Forests, Parks, and Recreation, as part of the Vermont State Park system.

There are 18 tent sites and 26 lean-to sites plus 15 boat moorings and a 100-slip marina and marine holding-tank pumpout facility. Restrooms have running water and hot showers. There are 3 miles of shoreline, hiking trails, a nature center/museum, park store and food service, rowboat and canoe rentals, and places to swim and picnic.

The park is only accessible by boat. The Island Runner ferry departs from the dock in nearby Kamp Kill Kare State Park.

Burton Island State Park is near other islands of Lake Champlain that are state parks, including Woods Island State Park, and Knight Island State Park. Knight Point State Park is on the nearby coast. Ball Island, a smaller island in the area, is privately owned.
