= Kamp Kill Kare State Park =

State park in Franklin County, Vermont

Kill Kare State Park
- Interactive map of Kill Kare State Park
- Type: State park
- Location: 2714 Hathaway Point Road; St. Albans, Vermont, USA
- Coordinates: 44.7791°N 73.183°W
- Area: 17 acres (6.9 ha)
- Created: 1967
- Operator: Vermont Department of Forests, Parks, and Recreation
- Open: Summer season
- Website: https://vtstateparks.com/killkare.html

Kill Kare State Park, is a state park in northwest Vermont on St. Albans Point on Lake Champlain. The day-use park is administered by the Vermont Department of Forests, Parks, and Recreation, as part of the Vermont State Park system.

Facilities include a swimming area, boat launch, kayak & canoe rentals, picnic tables and grills. The Rocky Point House Museum, dedicated in August 2012, features displays about the site's history from its days as a summer resort hotel to its use as a boys summer camp from 1906 to 1966. There is a 26’ x 40’ open-air shelter with a group-sized cooking grill and electricity, which can be reserved for group functions.

The Island Runner ferry departs from the dock to nearby Burton Island State Park seven times daily.

The State of Vermont bought the property in 1967 as a base to service Burton Island State Park.
