= Knight Island =

Knight Island may refer to:

- Knight Island (Alaska)
- Knight Island (Antarctica)
- Knight Island (California)
- Knight Island State Park, an island and state park in Vermont

== See also ==
- Knight Islands
