= Lake Saint Catherine =

Lake Saint Catherine or Lake St. Catherine may refer to:

- Lake St. Catherine (Louisiana)
- Lake Saint Catherine (Vermont)
