= North Hero State Park =

State park in Vermont, US

- Interactive map of North Hero State Park
- Type: State park
- Location: 3803 Lakeview Drive; North Hero, Vermont
- Coordinates: 44.909°N 73.237°W
- Area: 399 acres (161 ha)
- Created: 1963
- Operator: Vermont Department of Forests, Parks, and Recreation
- Open: Memorial Day weekend - Labor Day weekend
- Website: https://vtstateparks.com/northhero.html

North Hero State Park is a 399-acre day use state park on Lake Champlain in North Hero, Vermont. It is a stop on the Lake Champlain Paddlers' Trail.

Activities includes swimming, boating, fishing, hiking, picnicking, bicycling, wildlife watching, and winter sports.

There is a portable toilet at the beach area during the summer season, a concrete boat ramp, and picnic area.

The park used to host camping, but that has been discontinued.
