= Niquette Bay State Park =

State park in Colchester, Vermont

- Interactive map of Niquette Bay State Park
- Type: State park
- Location: 274 Raymond Road; Colchester, Vermont
- Coordinates: 44.5919°N 73.1900°W
- Area: 584 acres (2.36 km^{2})
- Operator: Vermont Department of Forests, Parks, and Recreation
- Open: Mid May - Early October
- Website: https://vtstateparks.com/niquette.html

Niquette Bay State Park is a 584 acres (2.36 km^{2}) state park in Colchester, Vermont, on the shore of Lake Champlain. The day-use park is located just off Route 2, about 4 miles (6.4 km) from Sand Bar State Park in Milton, Vermont.

The park offers activities such as swimming, fishing, hiking, wildlife watching, and winter sports.

It features a swimming beach and hiking trails through the forested area leading down to the beach.
