= Knight Point State Park =

State park in Grand Isle County, Vermont

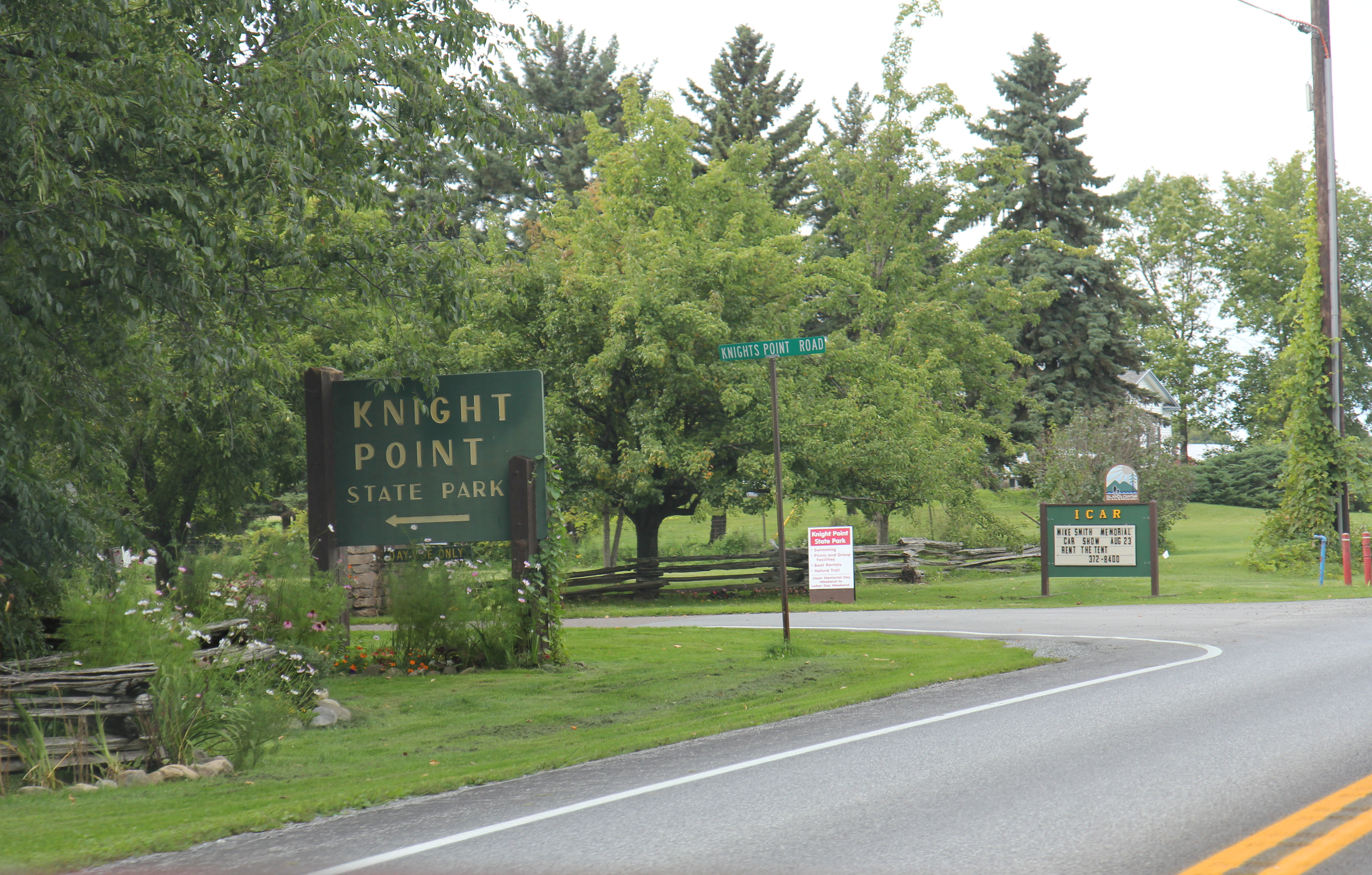

- Location within Vermont
- Interactive map of Knight Point State Park
- Location: North Hero, Vermont, United States
- Coordinates: 44°46′17″N 73°17′39″W
- Area: 54 acres (22 ha)
- Established: 1978
- Administrator: Vermont Department of Forests, Parks, and Recreation
- Website: Official website
- Vermont State Parks

Knight Point State Park is a day use state park off US Route 2 on North Hero Island in North Hero, Vermont, United States. Opened in 1978, the park is administered by the Vermont Department of Forests, Parks, and Recreation, as part of the Vermont State Park system. Features include a sandy swimming beach and boat rentals on Lake Champlain, and picnic areas with cooking grills.

The park houses the Island Center for Arts and Recreation, a community-based nonprofit that promotes area cultural events.

The Campmeeting Point Natural Area is a 3-acre section of the park. It includes 2,200 feet of Lake Champlain shoreline of least disturbed cobble beach that supports rare plant species, and the adjacent woodland with a grove of large oaks and hickory trees.
