= Sweet Pond State Park =

State park in Windham County, Vermont

- Interactive map of Sweet Pond State Park
- Type: State park
- Location: 2763 Sweet Pond Rd; Guilford, Vermont
- Coordinates: 44.0534°N 73.4123°W
- Area: 100 acres (40 ha)
- Operator: Vermont Department of Forests, Parks, and Recreation
- Open: Day use
- Website: https://vtstateparks.com/sweetpond.html

Sweet Pond State Park is a 100-acre state park in Guilford, Vermont, surrounding 18-acre Sweet Pond, an artificial impoundment on Keats Brook that is currently full as of 2019.

This is an undeveloped, day-use park. There is a public parking area and the 1.3 miles Sweet Pond Trail that circumnavigates the pond.
