= Crystal Lake State Park =

State park in Orleans County, Vermont

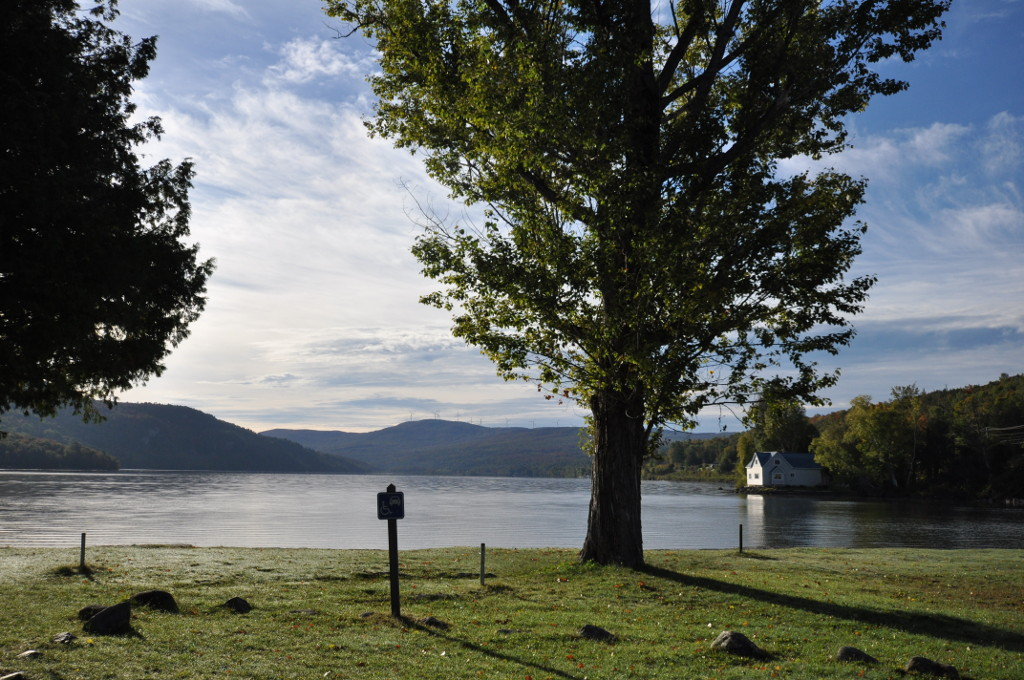
- View of Crystal Lake from the beach area

- Location within Vermont
- Interactive map of Crystal Lake State Park
- Location: Barton, Vermont, United States
- Coordinates: 44.7461°N 72.1712°W
- Area: 16.4 acres (6.6 ha)
- Established: 1942
- Administrator: Vermont Department of Forests, Parks, and Recreation
- Open: Memorial Day weekend - Labor Day weekend
- Website: Official website
- Vermont State Parks
- Crystal Lake State Park
- U.S. National Register of Historic Places
- MPS: Historic Park Landscapes in National and State Parks MPS
- NRHP reference No.: 05000949
- Added to NRHP: August 30, 2005

Crystal Lake State Park is a day-use state park and historic site in Barton, Vermont, United States. It is located at 96 Bellwater Avenue, off Willoughby Lake Road (Vermont Route 16) just east of the village, at the northwestern end of 763-acre (309 ha) Crystal Lake. It features a sandy beach with swimming area, and a bath house built by the Civilian Conservation Corps (CCC). A cottage is available for rental. The park was added to the U.S. National Register of Historic Places on August 30, 2005, for its association with the CCC.

== History ==
The park was developed in the 1930s, mainly through the efforts of crews of the Civilian Conservation Corps. They laid out the park, and built its parking lot, retaining wall, and most of the bathhouse. The bathhouse was designed in David Fried, an architect based in New Hampshire who also created designs for other CCC-built facilities in Vermont. It, like the retaining wall, was built out of locally quarried stone, and is unusual among the state's CCC-built facilities for its partly Modern design, which is tempered by the use of rusticated stone. The building was completed in 1942 with local workers, because the CCC crews had been disbanded for service related to World War II.

The ranger's house and rental cottage were both purchased as additions to the park in the 1990s, and the gate house was built in 2003.

== Features ==
Crystal Lake State Park is located at the northern end of Crystal Lake, a more than 750-acre (300 ha) body of water in southeastern Barton. The park is located just southeast of the village center, and is accessed via Bellwater Avenue off Vermont Route 16. The park has a wider area at its western end, where the entrance gate and parking area are located. Also in this area are a ranger's house and a small waterfront cottage, which is available for rental when the park is open. The parking lot is separated from the beach area to the south by a low stone wall built out of locally quarried granite. This wall gradually tapers off to the east. The eastern section of the park is narrow, with a strip of beach rising to a narrow grassy area. At the back of the grassy area near the parking lot is the bathhouse. The bathhouse has restrooms, changing areas, and a concession stand. Other features are about 40 grills, almost 80 picnic tables, play areas, and boat rentals. Activities include swimming, boating, fishing, wildlife watching and winter sports. There is hiking in nearby Willoughby State Forest. Crystal Lake Cottage accommodates up to 6 people.

== See also ==
- National Register of Historic Places listings in Orleans County, Vermont
