= List of Vermont state parks =

This is a list of state parks in the U.S. state of Vermont. Vermont state parks are managed by the Vermont Department of Forests, Parks and Recreation.

== List of state parks in Vermont ==
Name	Town	County	Approximate area		Year established
Name	Town	County	acres	ha	Year established
Alburgh Dunes State Park	Alburgh	Grand Isle	625	253	1996
Allis State Park	Brookfield	Orange	625	253	1928
Big Deer State Park	Groton	Caledonia			
Bomoseen State Park	Castleton	Rutland	3,526	1,427	1960
Boulder Beach State Park	Groton	Caledonia			
Branbury State Park	Salisbury & Leicester	Addison	64	26	1945
Brighton State Park	Brighton	Essex	152.4	61.7	
Burton Island State Park	St. Albans	Franklin	253	102	1964
Button Bay State Park	Ferrisburgh	Addison	236	96	1964
Camel's Hump State Park	Bolton, Duxbury, Huntington	Chittenden, Washington	21,258	8,603	1969
Camp Plymouth State Park	Ludlow	Windsor	295	119	1989
Coolidge State Park	Plymouth	Windsor	1,300	530	
Crystal Lake State Park	Barton	Orleans	16.41	6.64	1942
D.A.R. State Park	Addison	Addison	95	38	
D&H Rail Trail	Castleton, Pawlet, Poultney, Rupert	Bennington, Rutland			
Elmore State Park	Elmore	Lamoille	939.63	380.25	1934
Emerald Lake State Park	Dorset	Bennington	908	367	1960
Fort Dummer State Park	Brattleboro	Windham	260	110	
Gifford Woods State Park	Killington	Rutland	113	46	1931
Grand Isle State Park	Grand Isle	Grand Isle	226	91	1959
Green River Reservoir State Park	Hyde Park	Lamoille	5,174	2,094	
Half Moon Pond State Park	Hubbardton	Rutland			
Hazen's Notch State Park	Westfield	Orleans	307	124	
Jamaica State Park	Jamaica	Windham	772	312	1969
Kill Kare State Park	St. Albans	Franklin	17	6.9	1967
Kettle Pond State Park	Marshfield	Washington			
Kingsland Bay State Park	Ferrisburgh	Addison	264	107	
Knight Island State Park	North Hero	Grand Isle	115	47	1990
Knight Point State Park	North Hero	Grand Isle	54	22	1978
Lake Carmi State Park	Franklin	Franklin	482	195	1959
Lake St. Catherine State Park	Poultney	Rutland	117	47	1953
Lake Shaftsbury State Park	Shaftsbury	Bennington	84	34	1974
Little River State Park	Waterbury	Washington			
Lowell Lake State Park	Londonderry	Windham	356	144	1981
Maidstone State Park	Maidstone	Essex	475	192	1938
Molly Stark State Park	Wilmington	Bennington	168	68	1960
Molly's Falls Pond State Park	Cabot	Washington	1,029	416	2015
Mount Ascutney State Park	Windsor	Windsor	3,131	1,267	
Mount Philo State Park	Charlotte	Chittenden	232	94	1924
Muckross State Park	Springfield	Windsor	204	83	2016
New Discovery State Park	Marshfield	Washington	6,921	2,801	1933
Niquette Bay State Park	Colchester	Chittenden	553	224	
North Hero State Park	North Hero	Grand Isle	399	161	1963
Quechee State Park	Hartford	Windsor	688	278	1965
Ricker Pond State Park	Groton	Caledonia	50	20	1938
Sand Bar State Park	Milton	Chittenden	15	6.1	1933
Sentinel Rock State Park	Westmore	Orleans	356	144	2015
Seyon Lodge State Park	Groton	Caledonia			
Silver Lake State Park	Barnard	Windsor	34	14	1955
Smugglers' Notch State Park	Stowe	Lamoille			1936
Stillwater State Park	Groton	Caledonia	57	23	1938
Sweet Pond State Park	Guilford	Windham	100	40	
Taconic Mountains Ramble State Park	Hubbardton	Rutland	204	83	2016
Thetford Hill State Park	Thetford	Orange	362	146	
Townshend State Park	Townshend	Windham	41	17	
Underhill State Park	Underhill	Chittenden	250	100	
Waterbury Center State Park	Waterbury	Washington	90	36	
Wilgus State Park	Weathersfield	Windsor	89	36	
Woodford State Park	Woodford	Bennington	401	162	
Woods Island State Park	St. Albans	Franklin	125	51	1985

== Map of state parks in Vermont ==
Vermont State Parks

== See also ==
- List of Vermont state forests
- List of Vermont natural areas
