= Molly's Falls Pond State Park =

State park in Washington County, Vermont

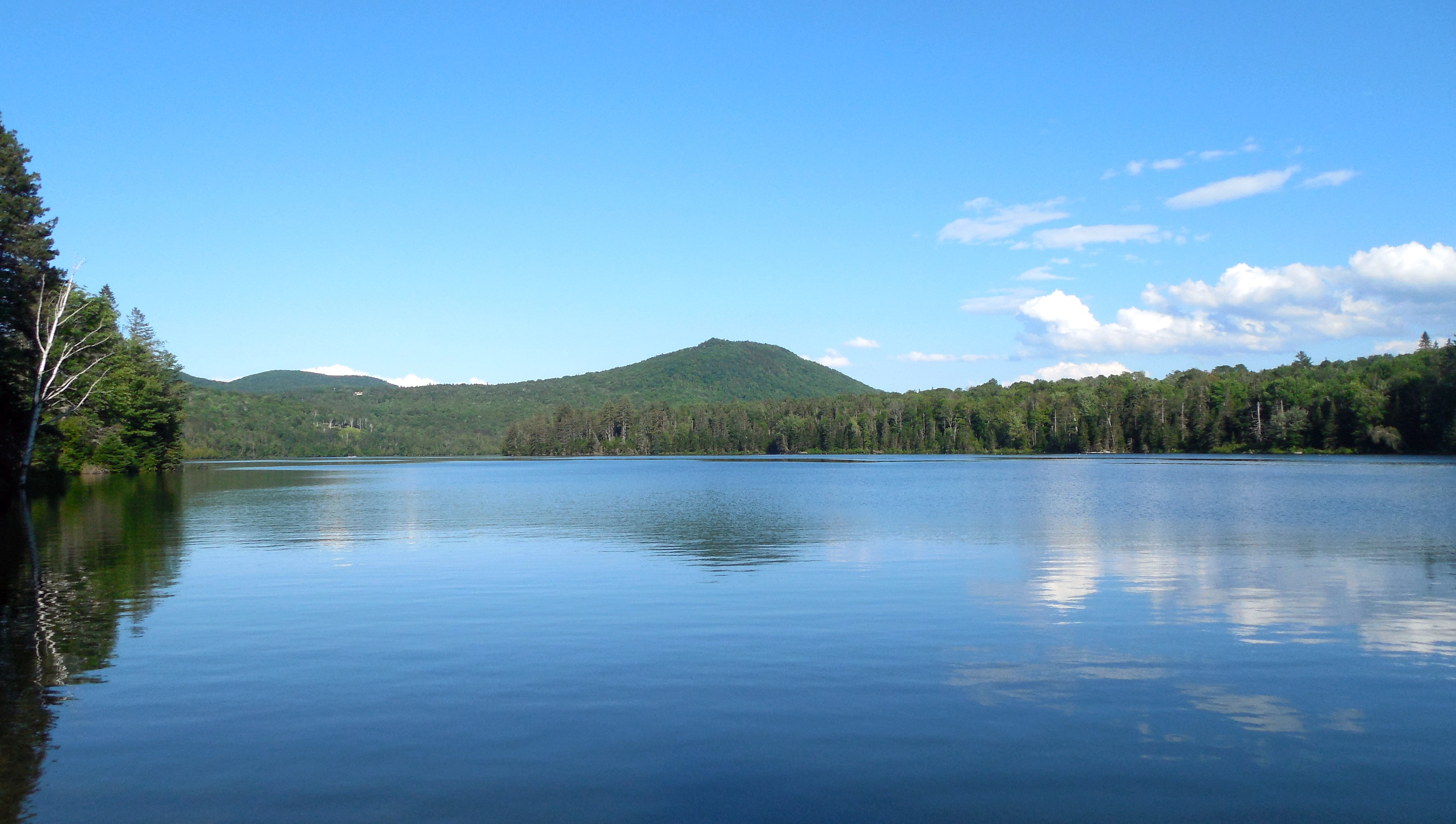
- Eastward view of Molly's Falls Pond
- Interactive map of Molly's Falls Pond State Park
- Type: State park
- Location: Cabot, Vermont
- Coordinates: 44°21′48″N 72°18′13″W
- Area: 1,064 acres (431 ha)
- Created: 2015
- Operator: Vermont Department of Forests, Parks, and Recreation
- Open: Day use
- Website: https://vtstateparks.com/mollysfalls.html

Molly's Falls Pond State Park is a 1,064 acres (431 ha) state park in Cabot and Marshfield, Vermont surrounding 411 acres (166 ha) Molly's Falls Pond, a reservoir that is also known as Marshfield Reservoir. This is an undeveloped, day-use park. There is a Vermont Fish and Wildlife access area at the northwest end of the park with a concrete boat ramp and two fishing platforms for shore fishing.

== History ==
The reservoir was created in the late 1920s by Molly's Falls Electric, Light and Power Company, with a hydropower dam and buildings to generate electricity for the Marshfield, Vermont area. Vermont Land Trust purchased 1,029 acres (416 ha) from Green Mountain Power in 2012 so that the State could eventually acquire the land. Green Mountain Power retained 23 acres (9.3 ha) that includes the dam and buildings on the reservoir's western end.

In 2015 the Vermont Department of Forests, Parks and Recreation bought the property from the Vermont Land Trust with funds from the federal Forest Legacy Program.
