= Alburgh Dunes State Park =

State park in Grand Isle County, Vermont

Alburg Dunes State Park
- Location within Vermont
- Interactive map of Alburg Dunes State Park
- Location: Alburgh, Vermont, United States
- Coordinates: 44°52′33″N 73°17′33″W
- Area: 625 acres (253 ha)
- Established: 1996
- Administrator: Vermont Department of Forests, Parks, and Recreation
- Open: Memorial Day weekend - Labor Day weekend
- Website: Official website
- Vermont State Parks

Alburg Dunes State Park is a state park in Alburgh, Vermont. The park lies on the shore of Lake Champlain and features one of the lake's largest beaches. It is named for the sand dunes near the center and western end of the south-facing natural sand beach.

This is a day use park with hours from 10 a.m. to sunset. There are sanitary facilities, a picnic area with grills, and parking. There is no public drinking water. A bicycle and pedestrian path goes between the dunes and wetlands.

The park includes the Charles E. Smith Natural Area, a sand dune community being managed by the State to protect and restore the rare plants that grow here.
