= Button Bay =

Inlet of Lake Champlain

Coordinates: 44°10′34″N 73°21′36″W

- Button Mould Bay; Buttonmold Bay
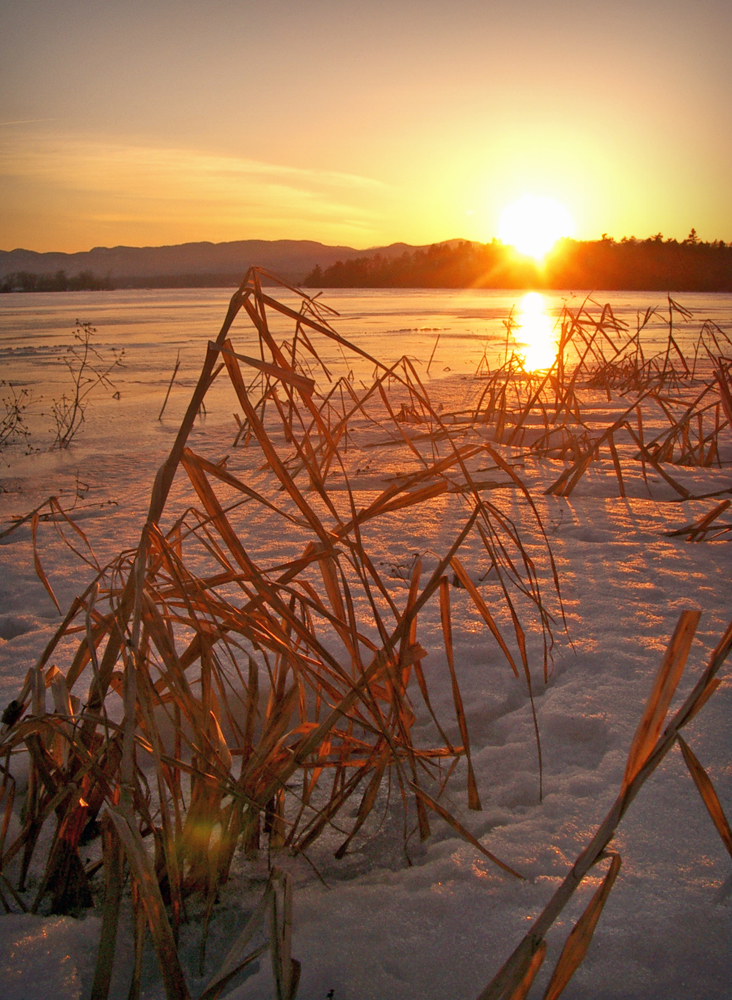

- Location within Vermont

Button Bay, previously known as Button Mould Bay or Buttonmold Bay, is an area of shallow water on the east shore of Lake Champlain. It is located in the town of Ferrisburgh (near Vergennes), in Addison County. It is situated between the Green Mountains of Vermont and the Adirondack Mountains in New York.

The Bay's name is from the clay concretions found on its shores which looked either like actual clay buttons or the moulds used in button making.

Button Bay State Park has been a state park since 1964.
