= Taconic Mountains Ramble State Park =

State park near Hubbardton, Vermont

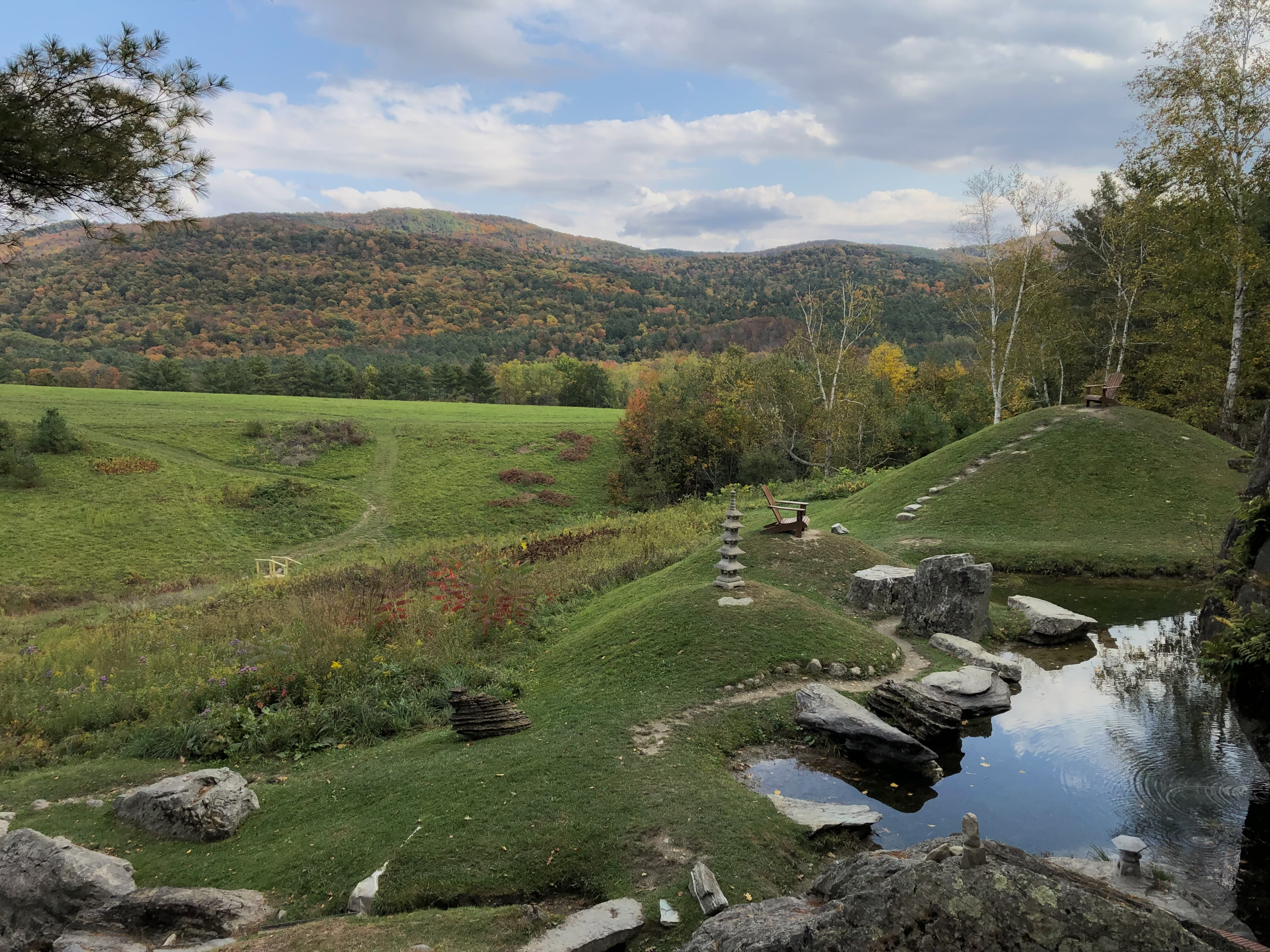
- Japanese Garden at Taconic Mountains Ramble State Park
- Interactive map of Taconic Mountains Ramble State Park
- Type: State park
- Location: Hubbardton, Vermont
- Coordinates: 43.6854766°N 73.142278°W
- Area: 204 acres (83 ha)
- Created: 2016
- Operator: Vermont Department of Forests, Parks, and Recreation
- Open: Day use
- Website: https://vtstateparks.com/taconic.html

Taconic Mountains Ramble State Park is a state park near Hubbardton, Vermont. It is a day-use park within the northern Taconic Mountains, near the Hubbardton Battlefield Historic Site.

The 204 acres (83 ha) holdings of the park were bequeathed in 2016 to the State of Vermont under a trust in the name of the late filmmaker Carson Davidson. The trust also funds continuing repairs and maintenance of the park.

== Facilities and setting ==
A one-story modular building near a small parking area has maps and park information posted. The park contains a Japanese garden left by Davidson, which is near the parking area. In 2017, it still had a hay field in operation. Taconic Ramble features trails through woods and waterfalls.
