= Molly Stark State Park =

State park in Bennington County, Vermont, United States

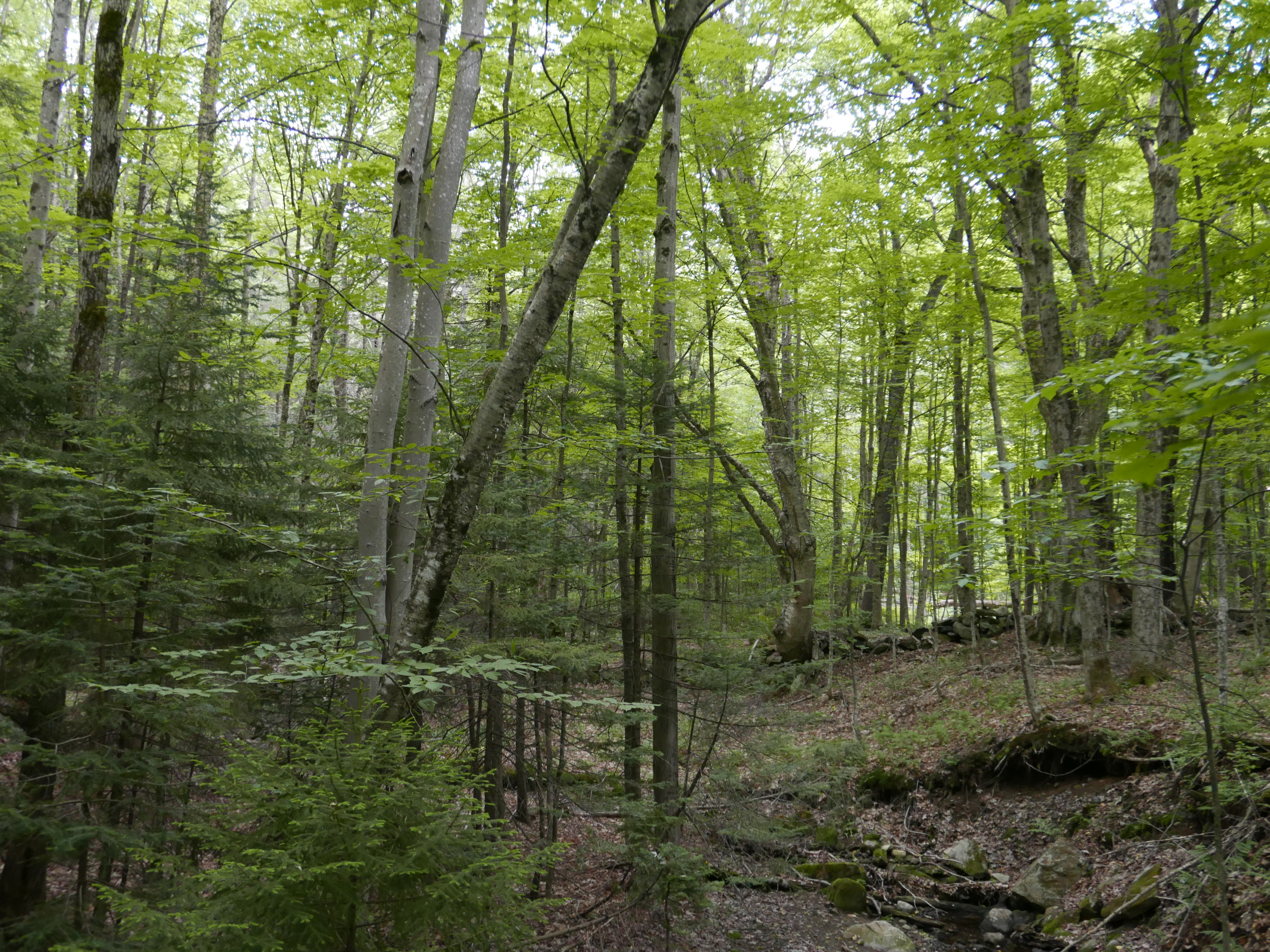
- Greenery

- Location within Vermont
- Interactive map of Molly Stark State Park
- Location: Wilmington, Vermont, United States
- Coordinates: 42°51′03″N 72°48′35″W
- Area: 168 acres (68 ha)
- Established: 1939 (opened 1960)
- Administrator: Vermont Department of Forests, Parks, and Recreation
- Website: Official website
- Vermont State Parks

Molly Stark State Park is a 168-acre state park in Wilmington, Vermont, United States. The park is named for Molly Stark, the famous wife of General John Stark of the American Revolutionary War, and is located along the Molly Stark Byway. Activities includes camping, hiking, picnicking, mountain biking, wildlife watching, and winter sports. There is a loop hiking trail up to the fire lookout tower on Mt. Olga. Facilities include a 23 tent/RV sites and 11 lean-to sites, flush toilets, hot showers, a play area and large pavilion with electricity, 3 charcoal grills, and 10 picnic tables.
