= Lake St. Catherine State Park =

State park in Rutland County, Vermont

- Location within Vermont
- Interactive map of Lake St. Catherine State Park
- Location: Poultney, Vermont, United States
- Coordinates: 43°28′49″N 73°12′17″W
- Area: 117 acres (47 ha)
- Established: 1953
- Administrator: Vermont Department of Forests, Parks, and Recreation
- Website: Official website
- Vermont State Parks

First opened as a picnic and swimming area in 1953, Lake St. Catherine State Park is a 117-acre (47 ha) state park located in Poultney, Vermont on the northern end of Lake Saint Catherine. Activities include camping, swimming, boating, fishing, hiking, picnicking, wildlife watching and winter sports. Facilities include 50 tent/RV sites and 11 lean-to sites, a snack bar and boat rentals. Park rangers offers interpretive programs including night hikes, nature crafts, campfire programs, amphibian explorations, and nature games. The park is administered by the Vermont Department of Forests, Parks, and Recreation as part of the Vermont state park system.
