= Camp Plymouth State Park =

State park in Windsor County, Vermont

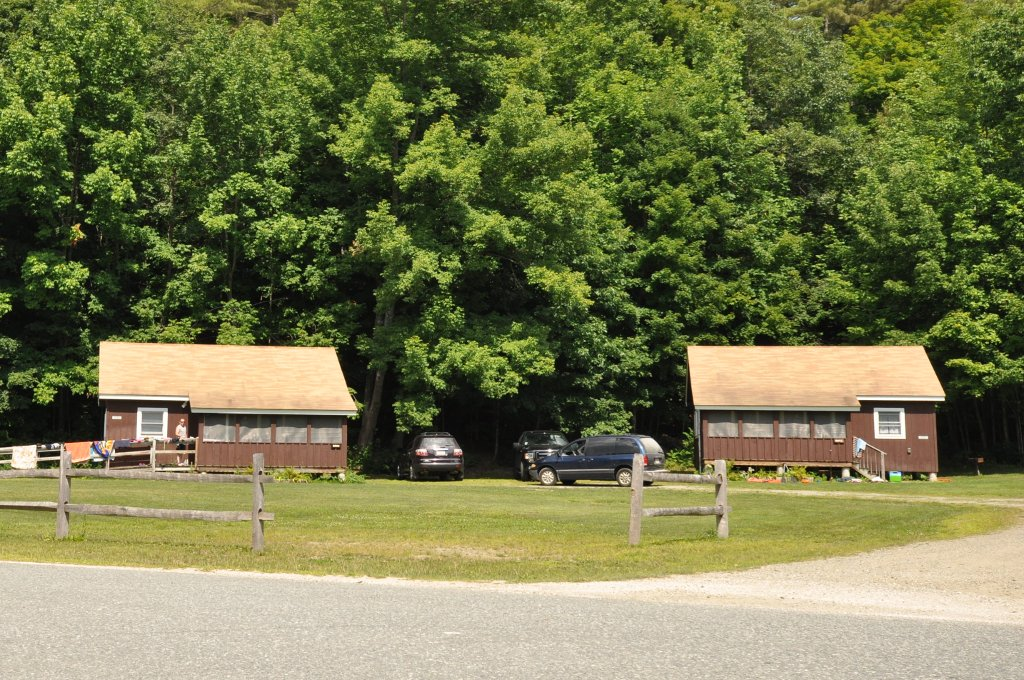
- Cabins at Camp Plymouth State Park

- Location within Vermont
- Interactive map of Camp Plymouth State Park
- Location: Ludlow, Vermont, United States
- Coordinates: 43°28′34″N 72°41′43″W
- Area: 295 acres (119 ha)
- Opened: 1989
- Administrator: Vermont Department of Forests, Parks, and Recreation
- Website: Official website
- Vermont State Parks

Camp Plymouth State Park is a 295-acre state park on 104-acre Echo Lake in Ludlow, Vermont. Activities includes swimming, hiking, picnicking, fishing, boating, horseback riding, wildlife watching, winter sports and group camping. Facilities include a swimming beach, group and horse camping facilities, playground, picnic area with grills, cabin rentals, boat rentals and a car-top boat launch. There are three group picnic pavilions that are available for rent.

== History ==
The park is named for its last use as Camp Plymouth, operated by the Boy Scouts of America from 1927 through the 1980s. The property was conserved in 1984 with the help of the Ottauquechee Land Trust and conveyed to the State of Vermont, which opened the park to the public in 1989. The property was also previously used as a farm, gold mine and girl's summer camp.
