= Button Bay State Park =

State park in Addison County, Vermont

- Location within Vermont
- Interactive map of Button Bay State Park
- Location: Ferrisburgh, Vermont, United States
- Coordinates: 44°10′59″N 73°21′01″W
- Area: 253 acres (102 ha)
- Established: 1964
- Administrator: Vermont Department of Forests, Parks, and Recreation
- Open: Friday of Memorial Day weekend through the second Monday in October
- Website: Official website
- Vermont State Parks

Button Bay State Park is a 253-acre state park on the shore of Button Bay on Lake Champlain in Ferrisburgh, Vermont, United States. The park includes the Button Point Natural Area, a 14-acre site including the 2-acre Button Island and an 8-acre peninsula with a mature forest stand.

Park activities includes boating, swimming, camping, fishing, hiking, picnicking, wildlife watching, water sports and winter sports. Facilities include a nature center, swimming pool, canoe and kayak rentals, a large picnic shelter and picnic areas, a play area, 70 campsites including 13 lean-tos and 4 cabins, flush toilets, hot showers, and a dump station. Park rangers offer interpretive programs including night hikes, campfire programs, amphibian explorations, and nature crafts and games.
