= Knight Island State Park =

State park in Grand Isle County, Vermont

- Location within Vermont
- Interactive map of Knight Island State Park
- Location: North Hero, Vermont, United States
- Coordinates: 44°48′42″N 73°15′13″W
- Area: 175 acres (71 ha)
- Established: 1990
- Administrator: Vermont Department of Forests, Parks, and Recreation
- Website: Official website
- Vermont State Parks

Knight Island State Park is a state park near North Hero, Vermont, comprising most of 185-acre Knight Island on Lake Champlain, except for 10 acres on the southern tip that are private. The park is administered by the Vermont Department of Forests, Parks, and Recreation, as part of the Vermont State Park system. The park can only be reached by boat, and visitors must make their own arrangements to get there. There is no dock.

Activities include hiking, fishing, picnicking, wildlife watching, camping and winter sports. Knight Island features seven primitive campsites, with composting outhouses and no potable water supply. Reservations are necessary for camping.
