= Woodford State Park =

State park in Bennington County, Vermont

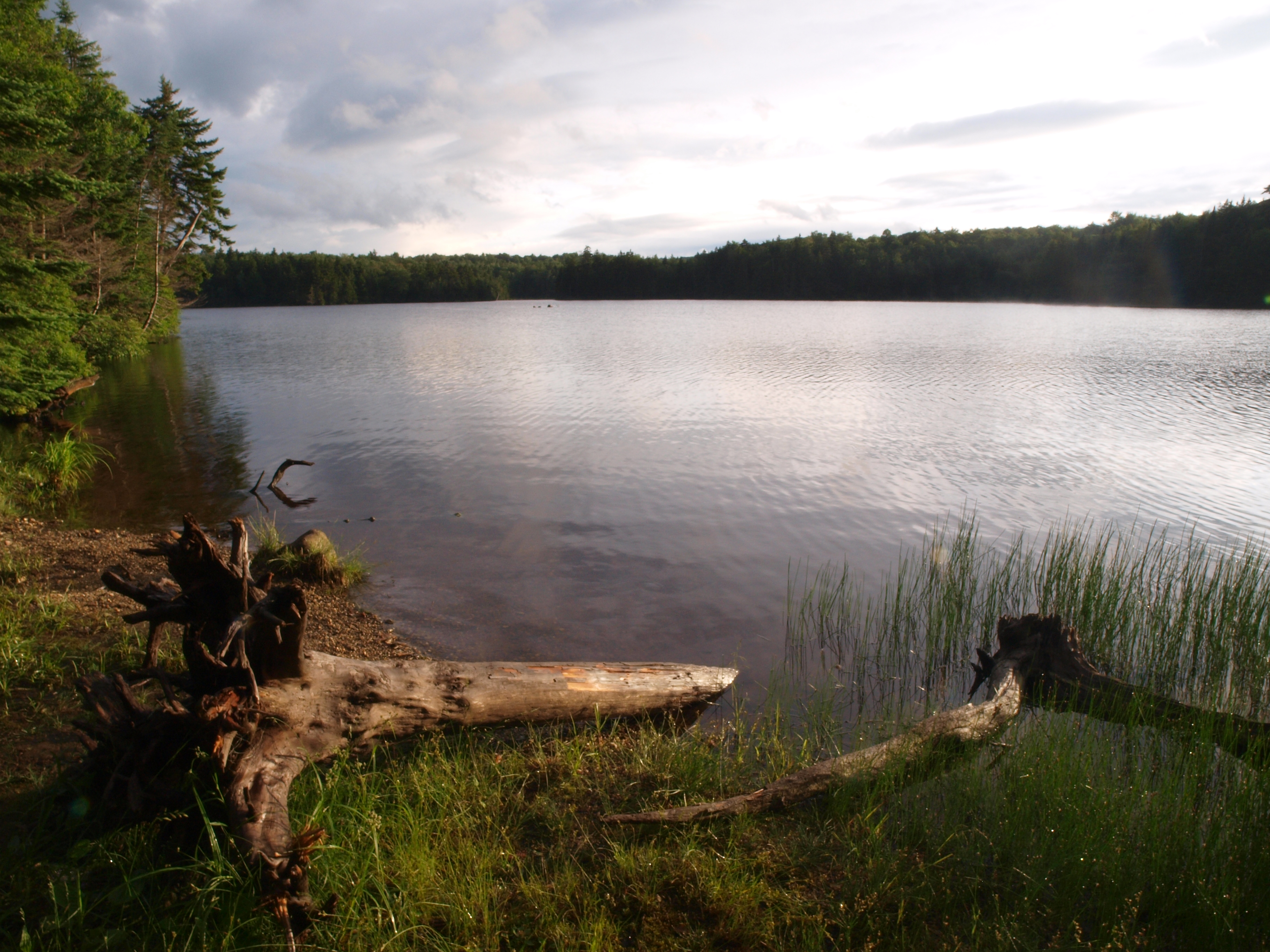
- Adams Reservoir, Woodford State Park, July 2014
- Interactive map of Woodford State Park
- Type: State park
- Location: 142 State Park Road; Woodford, Vermont
- Coordinates: 42.8908°N 73.0375°W
- Area: 398 acres (161 ha)
- Created: 1963
- Operator: Vermont Department of Forests, Parks, and Recreation
- Website: https://vtstateparks.com/woodford.html

Woodford State Park is a 398-acre state park surrounding Adams Reservoir in Woodford, Vermont. The park is at an elevation of 2400 feet in the Green Mountain National Forest. It is located along the Molly Stark Byway. It was designated a state park in 1963.

Activities includes swimming, boating, camping, fishing, hiking, picnicking, bicycling, wildlife watching, letterboxing, and winter sports.

Facilities include a small beach, boat rentals, picnic area, 103 campsites including 83 tent/RV sites and 20 lean-tos, flush toilets, hot showers, and a dump station. There is a 2.7 mile trail around the lake. Park rangers offer interpretive programs including night hikes, campfire programs, amphibian explorations, and nature crafts and games.
