= Lake Shaftsbury State Park =

State park in Bennington County, Vermont

- Location within Vermont
- Interactive map of Lake Shaftsbury State Park
- Location: Shaftsbury, Vermont, United States
- Coordinates: 43°01′21″N 73°11′01″W
- Area: 84 acres (34 ha)
- Established: 1974
- Administrator: Vermont Department of Forests, Parks, and Recreation
- Website: Official website
- Vermont State Parks

Lake Shaftsbury State Park is an 84-acre state park around Lake Shaftsbury in Shaftsbury, Vermont. Activities includes swimming, non-motorized boating, fishing, picnicking, hiking, wildlife watching, camping and winter sports. Facilities include non-motorized boat rentals, a snack bar, beach, restroom, play area and picnic area. There is a large open pavilion with electricity, grills, tables and chairs. Camping facilities include a fully furnished waterfront cottage that sleeps six, with deck and grill, and a group camping area with clusters of lean-tos. Port-a-let facilities are available. The park is located in Arlington State Forest.
