= Woods Island State Park =

- Interactive map of Woods Island State Park
- Type: State park
- Location: 1 Woods Island; St. Albans, Vermont, USA
- Coordinates: 44.803°N 73.208°W
- Area: 125 acres (51 ha)
- Created: 1985
- Operator: Vermont Department of Forests, Parks, and Recreation
- Open: Summer season
- Website: https://vtstateparks.com/woodsisland.html

Woods Island State Park is a state park on Lake Champlain in Vermont. The park comprises the 125-acre Woods Island, and is located off St. Albans Point in Franklin County, Vermont. It is administered by the Vermont Department of Forests, Parks, and Recreation, as part of the Vermont State Park system. The park can only be reached by boat, and visitors must make their own arrangements to get there. There is no dock.

Woods Island features five primitive campsites, with minimal sanitary facilities and no potable water supply. Reservations are necessary for camping.
