= Hazen's Notch State Park =

State park in Orleans County, Vermont

- Location within Vermont
- Interactive map of Hazen's Notch State Park
- Location: Westfield, Vermont, United States
- Coordinates: 44°50′40″N 72°31′13″W
- Area: 307 acres (124 ha)
- Established: 1934
- Administrator: Vermont Department of Forests, Parks, and Recreation
- Website: Official website
- Vermont State Parks

Hazen's Notch State Park is a 307-acre state park in the town of Westfield, Vermont, United States. The park features the height of land of Hazen's Notch, a mountain pass in the northern Green Mountains of Vermont. It is located on Vermont Route 58.

Activities in the undeveloped park include hunting, hiking, bird watching, and snowshoeing. The Long Trail passes through sections of the park.

The park includes the 273-acre Hazen's Notch Natural Area, which features cliffs of serpentine rock that support rare alpine and serpentine-adapted plant species. Peregrine falcons have also nested here historically. The Long Trail passes through the Natural Area. The Long Range Management Plan emphasizes protection of natural resources while allowing for undeveloped recreation. The plan includes a detailed geological, natural, cultural and recreational history of Hazen's Notch.
