= Sand Bar State Park =

State park in Chittenden County, Vermont

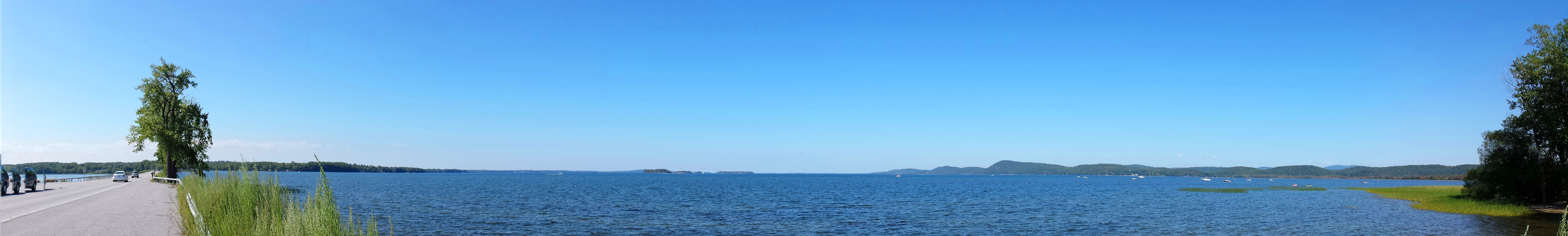
- Interactive map of Sand Bar State Park
- Type: State park
- Location: 1215 US Rt 2. Milton, Vermont
- Coordinates: 44.62709°N 73.23985°W
- Area: 15 acres (6.1 ha)
- Created: 1933
- Operator: Vermont Department of Forests, Parks, and Recreation
- Status: Open Memorial Day weekend - Labor Day weekend
- Website: https://vtstateparks.com/sandbar.html

Sand Bar State Park is a 15-acre (6.1 ha) state park in Milton, Vermont on the shore of Lake Champlain. The park was established in 1933.

== Setting ==
Entrance on US-2

The park is located on the eastern shore of Lake Champlain, north of Vermont's largest city, Burlington. It is located along United States Route Route 2 on the eastern end of a natural sandbar that spans the lake between the town of Milton in Chittenden County on the Vermont mainland and South Hero Island in Grand Isle County. Most of the sandbar is now topped by a causeway carrying US 2. The park occupies a roughly triangular parcel of land, bounded on the east by the 1,560-acre (630 ha) Sand Bar Wildlife Management Area, also operated by the state. Sand Bar Park Road extends north from US 2, providing access to the park's facilities.

== Facilities ==
Bathhouse

Park facilities include a 2,000-foot (610 m) sand beach, canoe and kayak rentals, a food concession, picnic tables with cooking grills, volleyball courts, horseshoes, and swings. The most prominent built feature of the park is a large stone bathhouse. It was built by the Civilian Conservation Corps (CCC) in 1933–35.

Activities includes swimming, boating, fishing, hiking, picnicking, wildlife watching, water sports and winter sports.

== History ==
The park was Vermont's sixth state park and the first to be created on land purchased by the state. The land was developed in 1933 under the provisions of a 1929 state law authorizing such purchases. At first, it was primarily swampy marshland, which crews of the CCC cleared, filled, and graded. In addition to the bathhouse, the CCC also built a stone grill which still stands in the park. The upper level of the bathhouse was originally used as living quarters for caretakers and lifeguards but is now used for storage, while the rest of the structure, only modified to provide electricity and plumbing, continues in its original use. A reduced area of the park (about 4.5 acres (1.8 ha)) of the park surrounding the bathhouse was listed on the National Register of Historic Places in 2002 for its CCC-related elements.

== See also ==
- National Register of Historic Places listings in Chittenden County, Vermont
