= Mount Ascutney State Park =

State park in Windsor County, Vermont

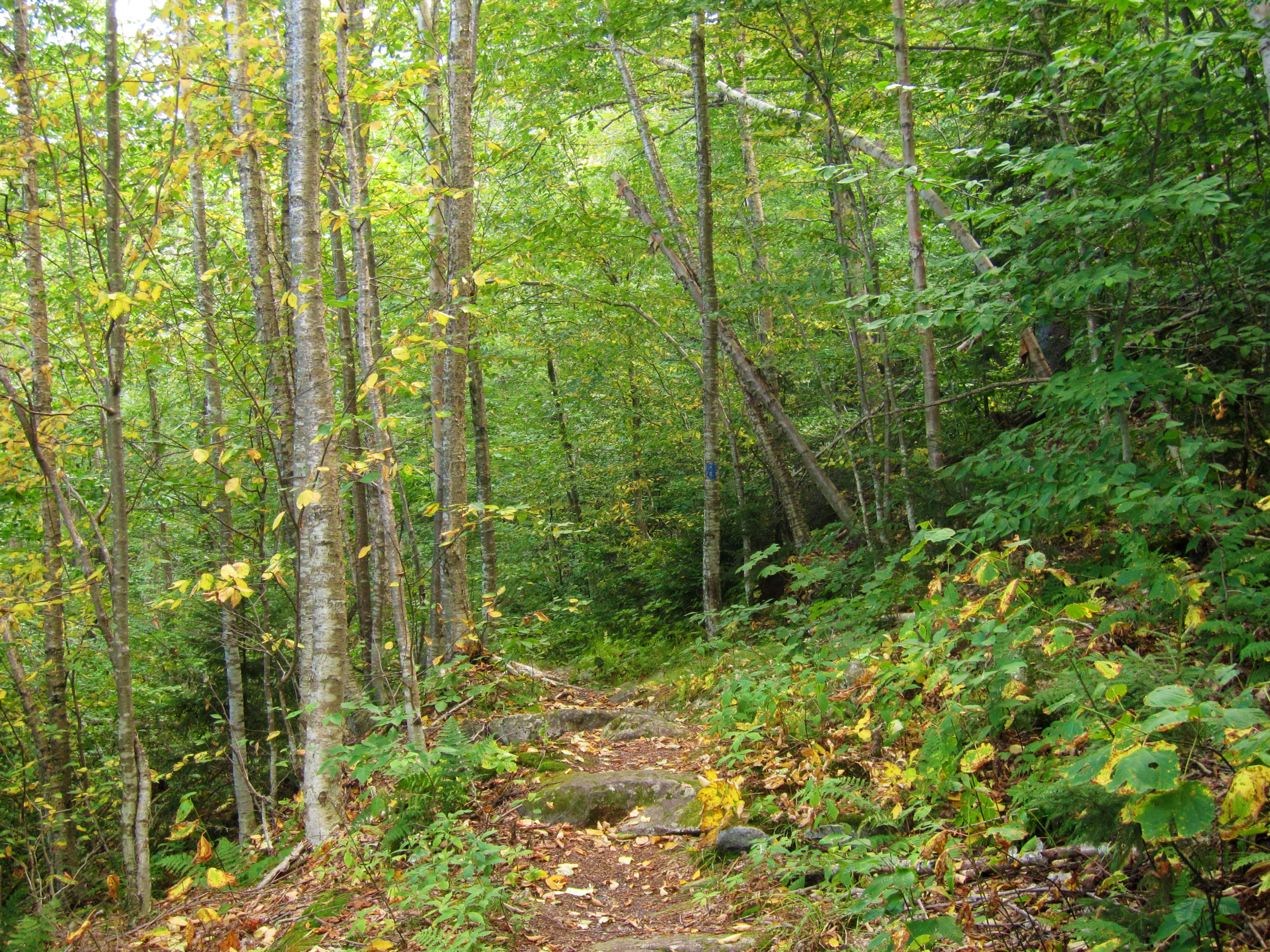

- Location within Vermont
- Interactive map of Mount Ascutney State Park
- Location: Windsor, Vermont, United States
- Coordinates: 43°26′16″N 72°24′21″W
- Area: 3,131 acres (1,267 ha)
- Created: 1935-1938
- Administrator: Vermont Department of Forests, Parks, and Recreation
- Website: Official website
- Vermont State Parks

Mount Ascutney State Park is a state park in the U.S. state of Vermont. The park entrance is located along Vermont Route 44-A near the town of Windsor in Windsor County. Operated by the Vermont Department of Forests, Parks and Recreation, a significant portion of the park is listed on the National Register of Historic Places.

== Description ==
The park has more than 12 miles (19 km) of hiking trails. Four of these trails—the Futures Trail, the Weathersfield Trail, the Brownsville Trail, and the Windsor Trail—lead to the summit of Mount Ascutney, the park's most significant feature. Alternatively, visitors may drive to within a half-mile of the summit via the Mount Ascutney Parkway, a paved toll road that rises over 2,000 feet (610 m) in less than 4 miles (6.4 km). On the parkway, grades average 10% with some sections as steep at 19%.

In 2016, the state designated the Cascade Falls Natural Area in the southwest corner of the park. The Weathersfield Trail, named after the nearby town of Weathersfield, Vermont, traverses the 203-acre (82 ha) natural area on its way to the summit of Mount Ascutney. The trail passes by Cascade Falls, an 84-foot (26 m) waterfall on Ascutney Brook.

== History ==
Mount Ascutney State Park was founded in the 1930s by the state with funding provided by New Deal-era federal government funding. In 1933, the state acquired more than 1,000 acres (400 ha), and a crew of the Civilian Conservation Corps (CCC) was assigned to the area to develop it for recreational use. The CCC crew was responsible for construction of the parkway to the summit area, campground and picnic areas, and other amenities. The company assigned to the park was relocated to Ludlow in 1938. The area where the CCC camp was located is now part of the main campground; no buildings survive. one thousand five hundred acres (610 ha) of the park were listed on the National Register of Historic Places in 2002 in recognition of its CCC legacy.
