= Lake Saint Catherine (Vermont) =

Lake in Rutland County, Vermont, United States

Lake St. Catherine
- Location within Vermont Location within the United States
- Location: Poultney / Wells, Rutland County, Vermont, US
- Coordinates: 43°28′00″N 73°12′48″W
- Basin countries: United States
- Max. length: < 5 mi (8.0 km)
- Surface area: 852 acres (3.4 km^{2})
- Max. depth: < 68 ft (21 m)
- Surface elevation: 482 ft (147 m)
- Islands: 1

Lake Saint Catherine is an 852-acre (345 ha) body of water located in Rutland County, Vermont in the towns of Wells and Poultney. Lake St. Catherine State Park is located along its eastern shore.
