= Lowell Lake State Park =

State park in Windham County, Vermont

- Location within Vermont
- Interactive map of Lowell Lake State Park
- Location: Londonderry, Vermont, United States
- Coordinates: 43°13′10″N 72°45′41″W
- Area: 361 acres (146 ha)
- Established: 1977
- Administrator: Vermont Department of Forests, Parks, and Recreation
- Website: Official website
- Vermont State Parks

Lowell Lake State Park is a day use state park on 102-acre Lowell Lake in Londonderry, Vermont, United States. Activities include non-motorized boating, shoreline fishing, picnic facilities, and portable toilets.

The Lowell Lake Trail is a loop approximately 3.5 miles in length, which encircles the lake. Along the trail is a Revolutionary War-era cemetery.
