= Jamaica State Park =

State Park in Windham County, Vermont

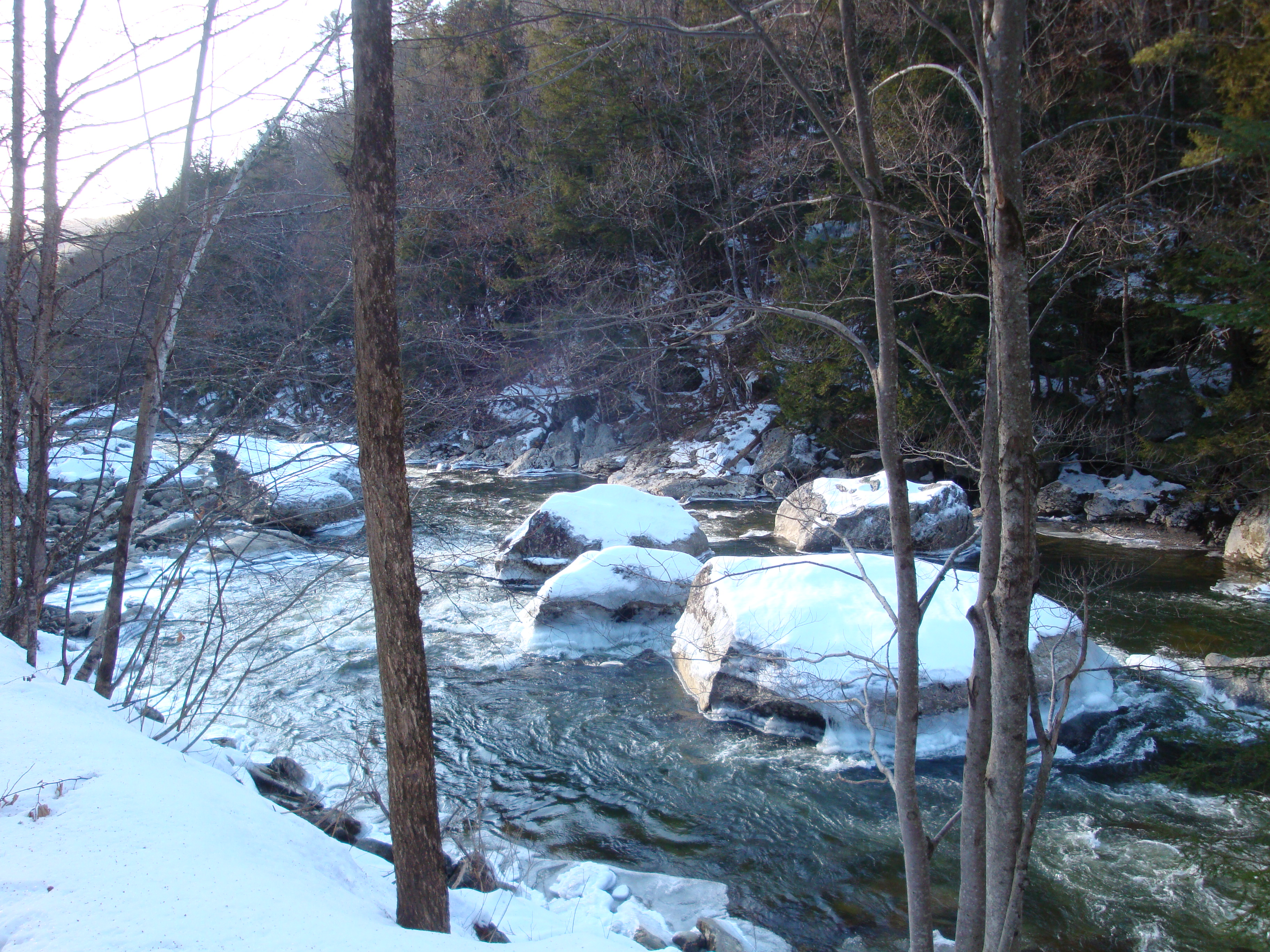

- Location within Vermont
- Interactive map of Jamaica State Park
- Location: Jamaica, Vermont, United States
- Coordinates: 43°06′21″N 72°46′24″W
- Area: 772 acres (312 ha)
- Established: 1969
- Administrator: Vermont Department of Forests, Parks, and Recreation
- Website: Official website
- Vermont State Parks

Jamaica State Park is a 772-acre state park on the shore of the West River in Jamaica, Vermont, United States. Activities includes camping, swimming, boating, river fishing, hiking, picnicking, mountain biking, wildlife watching, and winter sports. Facilities include a picnic shelter, 43 tent/trailer sites, 18 lean-to shelters, two rest rooms with hot showers, and firewood and ice available for purchase. There is a nature center, and park rangers offer interpretive programs including night hikes, campfire programs, amphibian explorations, and nature crafts and games.

The 211-acre Hamilton Falls Natural Area is located in the park. Cobb Brook includes several waterfalls, and Hamilton Falls drops 40 to 50 feet into a large pool. There is a trail to the top and bottom of the falls.

The park includes a 2-mile section of the 16-mile West River Trail, a universally-accessible trail along the old railbed for the West River Railroad. The trail leads up to Ball Mountain Dam.
