= Brighton State Park =

State park in Essex County, Vermont

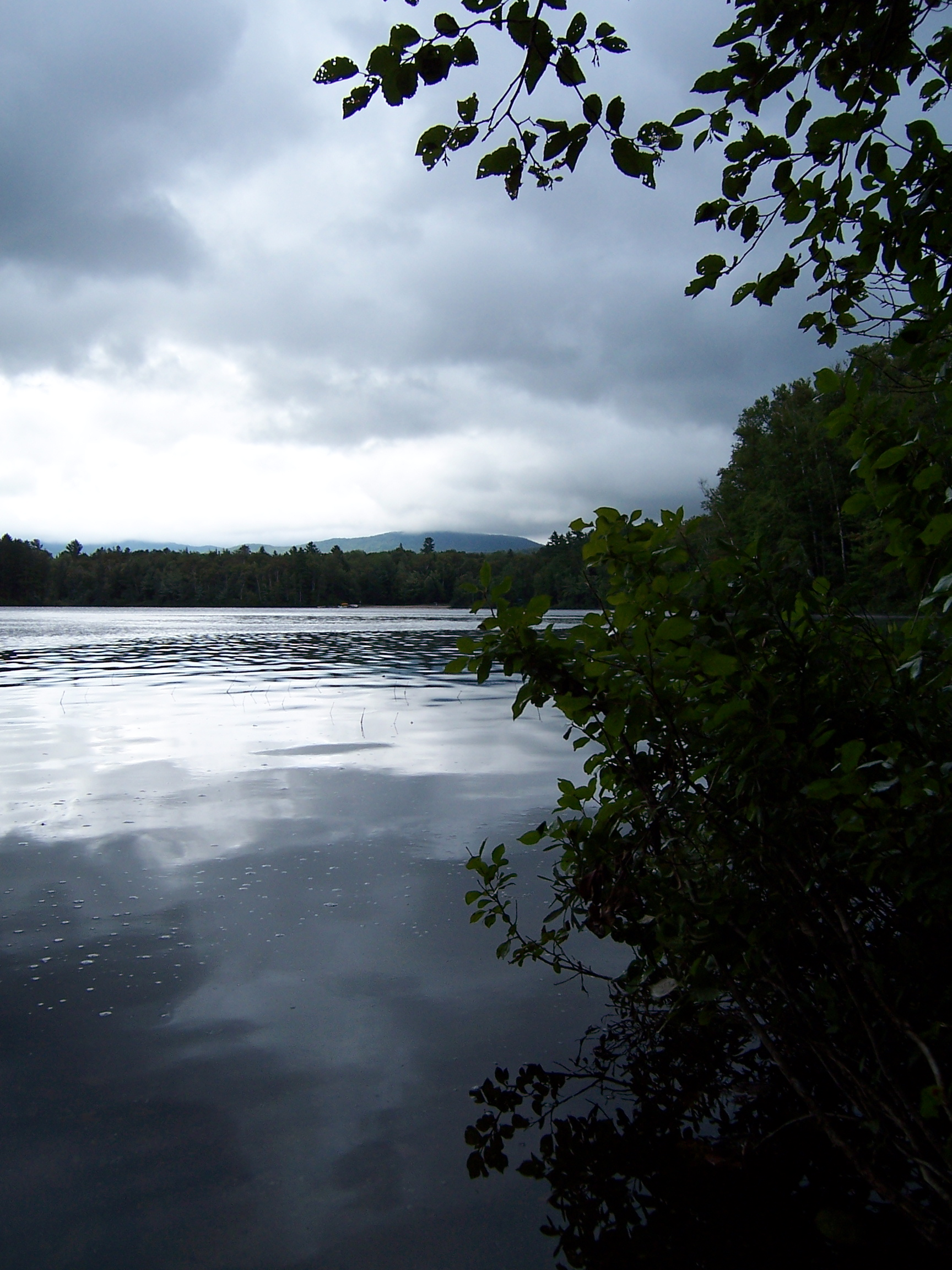

- Location within Vermont
- Interactive map of Brighton State Park
- Location: Island Pond, Vermont, United States
- Coordinates: 44°47′53″N 71°51′18″W
- Area: 61.7 ha (152 acres)
- Administrator: Vermont Department of Forests, Parks, and Recreation
- Open: Friday of Memorial Day weekend through second Monday in October
- Website: Official website
- Vermont State Parks

Brighton State Park is a state park in Island Pond, Vermont. The park features a campground on the 102-acre Spectacle Pond, which is mostly undeveloped. There is also a day use beach and bathhouse located on 600-acre Island Pond just a half mile from the campground.

Activities includes boating, swimming, camping, fishing, hiking, picnicking, wildlife watching and winter sports.

Facilities include two sandy beaches, bathhouse, boat rentals, 5 cabins, 61 tent/RV sites and 23 lean-tos, flush toilets, hot showers, and a dump station. There is a nature center and park rangers offer interpretive programs including night hikes, campfire programs, amphibian explorations, and nature crafts and games.

The state has designated the 15-acre Spectacle Pond Natural Area, which features a natural stand of mature red pines that are uncommon in Vermont.
