= North Hero, Vermont =

- Town
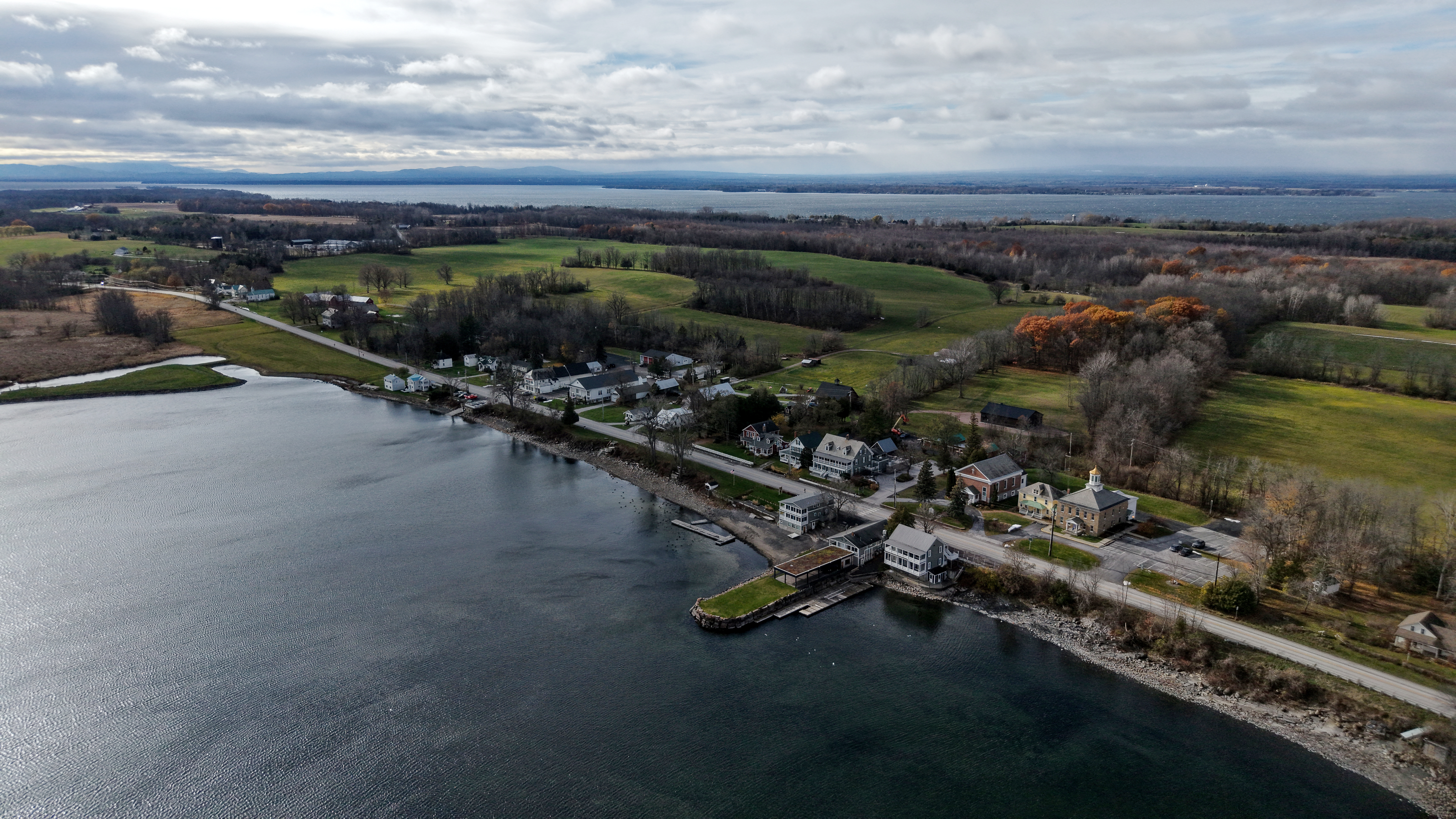
- North Hero, VT, from the northeast

- Wordmark

- Location in Grand Isle County and the state of Vermont
- Coordinates: 44°52′05″N 73°14′40″W
- Country: United States
- State: Vermont
- County: Grand Isle

Area
  - Total: 46.6 sq mi (120.6 km^{2})
  - Land: 13.4 sq mi (34.8 km^{2})
  - Water: 33.1 sq mi (85.8 km^{2})
- Elevation: 98 ft (30 m)

Population (2020)
  - Total: 939
  - Density: 70/sq mi (27/km^{2})
- Time zone: UTC-5 (Eastern (EST))
  - Summer (DST): UTC-4 (EDT)
- ZIP code: 05474
- Area code: 802
- FIPS code: 50-50650
- GNIS feature ID: 1462164
- Website: www.northherovt.com

North Hero is a town in and the shire town (county seat) of Grand Isle County, Vermont, United States. The population was 939 at the 2020 census.

The town was named in honor of the American Revolutionary War hero Ethan Allen.

== Government ==
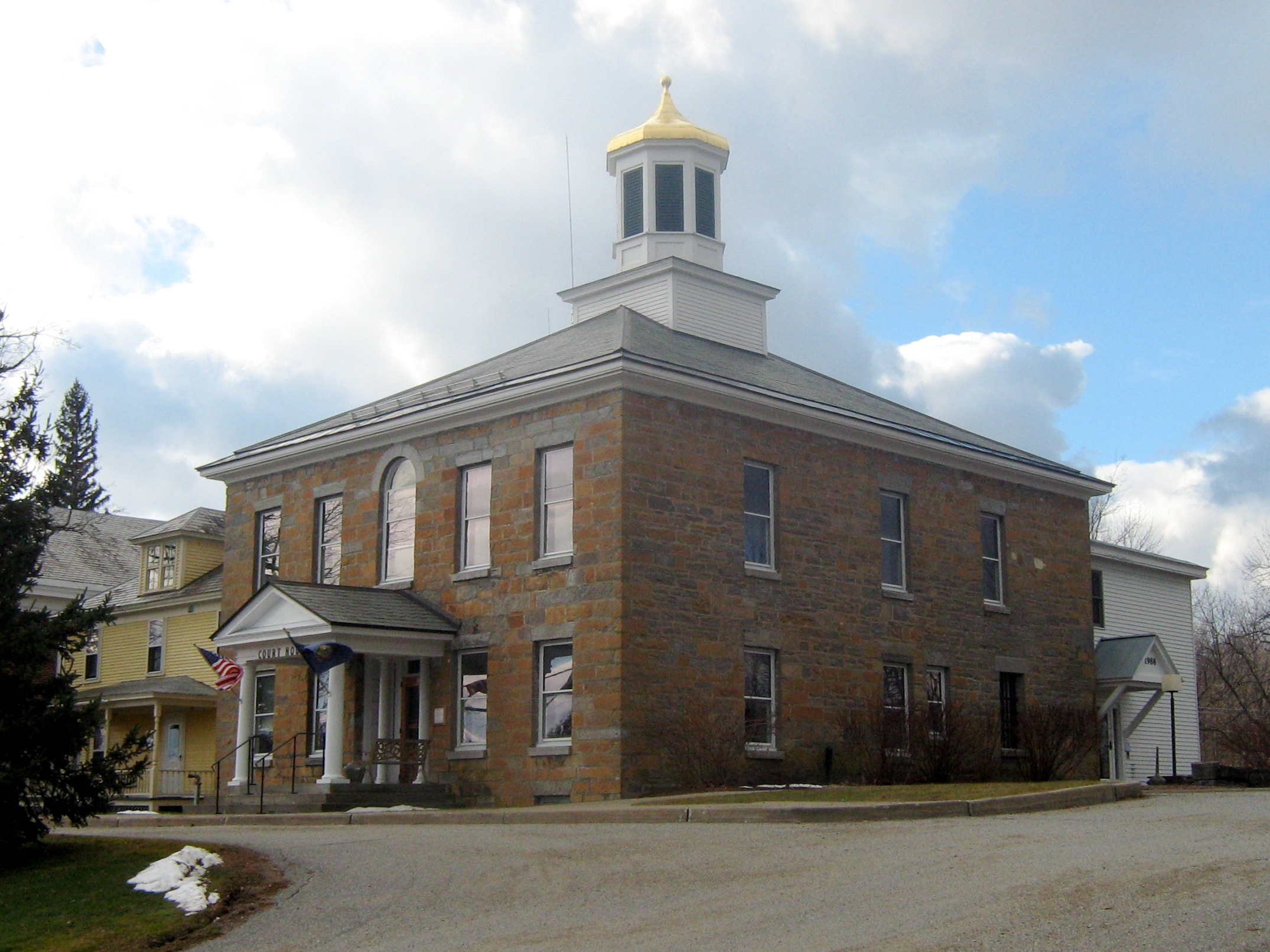
Grand Isle County Courthouse

The North Hero Town Office is at 3541 US Route 2 and shares a building with the town community center.

== Geography ==
North Hero is in the center of Grand Isle County and occupies the entire North Hero Island in Lake Champlain, as well as Knight Island, Butler Island, and a handful of much smaller islands. The town is bordered to the north by Alburgh, to the west by Isle La Motte, and to the south by the town of Grand Isle, all in Grand Isle County. To the east, across Lake Champlain, are the towns of St. Albans and Swanton in Franklin County, Vermont, while to the southwest, across the western arm of Lake Champlain, is the town of Beekmantown in Clinton County, New York.

U.S. Route 2 crosses North Hero from north to south, departing the town in the north by a bridge over the Alburg Passage into the town of Alburgh, and in the south by a bridge over The Gut to South Hero Island (Grand Isle).

According to the United States Census Bureau, the town of North Hero has an area of 46.6 square miles (120.6 km^{2}), of which 13.4 square miles (34.8 km^{2}) is land and 33.1 square miles (85.8 km^{2}), or 71.11%, is water.

== Demographics ==
Historical population
Census	Pop.	Note	%±
1790	125		—
1800	324		159.2%
1810	552		70.4%
1820	503		−8.9%
1830	638		26.8%
1840	716		12.2%
1850	730		2.0%
1860	594		−18.6%
1870	601		1.2%
1880	637		6.0%
1890	550		−13.7%
1900	712		29.5%
1910	496		−30.3%
1920	494		−0.4%
1930	485		−1.8%
1940	442		−8.9%
1950	407		−7.9%
1960	328		−19.4%
1970	364		11.0%
1980	442		21.4%
1990	502		13.6%
2000	810		61.4%
2010	803		−0.9%
2020	939		16.9%
U.S. Decennial Census

As of the census of 2000, there were 810 people, 333 households, and 237 families residing in the town. The population density was 58.9 people per square mile (22.8/km^{2}). There were 906 housing units at an average density of 65.9 per square mile (25.5/km^{2}). The racial makeup of the town was 97.53% White, 0.25% African American, 0.25% Native American, 0.37% Pacific Islander, and 1.60% from two or more races. Hispanic or Latino of any race were 0.62% of the population.

There were 333 households, of which 26.7% had children under 18 living with them, 61.0% were married couples living together, 6.3% had a female householder with no husband present, and 28.8% were non-families. 19.5% of all households were made up of individuals, and 5.1% had someone living alone who was 65 or older. The average household size was 2.43 and the average family size was 2.79.

In the town, the population was spread out, with 21.9% under 18, 4.8% from 18 to 24, 26.7% from 25 to 44, 34.3% from 45 to 64, and 12.3% who were 65 or older. The median age was 43. For every 100 females, there were 101.5 males. For every 100 females age 18 and over, there were 101.0 males.

The median income for a household in the town was $45,577, and the median income for a family was $51,964. Males had a median income of $36,875 versus $31,125 for females. The per capita income was $26,859. About 5.5% of families and 9.0% of the population were below the poverty line, including 12.9% of those under 18 and 4.0% of those 65 or older.

== Media ==
=== Newspapers and other publications ===
North Hero is the home of the weekly newspaper The Islander, which has been published in North Hero since 1974, and covers the northern Champlain Valley.

== Notable person ==
- Bernie Sanders, former mayor of Burlington (1981–1989), U.S. Senator from Vermont since 2007
