= List of Vermont natural areas =

This is a list of natural areas in the U.S. state of Vermont.

== Natural areas on public land in Vermont ==
By definition, natural areas on public land in Vermont are "limited areas of land that have retained their wilderness character." These areas are designated, protected, and managed by the Vermont Department of Forests, Parks and Recreation.

=== List of natural areas on public land ===
Name	Town	County	Approximate area		Year established
Name	Town	County	acres	ha	Year established
Amity Pond Natural Area	Pomfret	Windsor	182	74	1969
Big Falls of the Missisquoi Natural Area	Troy	Orleans	16	6.5	1996
Button Point Natural Area	Ferrisburgh	Addison	14	5.7	
Cambridge Natural Area	Cambridge	Lamoille	22	8.9	1965
Camel's Hump Natural Area	Duxbury, Huntington, Fayston, Bolton, Buels Gore	Chittenden, Washington	7,850	3,180	1965
Campmeeting Point Natural Area	North Hero	Grand Isle	3	1.2	
Cascade Falls Natural Area	Weathersfield	Windsor	203	82	2016
Charles E. Smith Natural Area	Alburg	Grand Isle			
Daniel's Notch Natural Area	Cambridge	Lamoille	100	40	1996
Emerald Lake Natural Area	Dorset	Bennington	4	1.6	
Ford Natural Area	Winhall	Bennington	32	13	
Fisher-Scott Memorial Pines Natural Area	Arlington	Bennington	22	8.9	1997
Gifford Woods Natural Area	Killington	Rutland	7	2.8	1965
Granville Gulf Spruce-Hemlock Stand	Granville	Addison	20	8.1	
Hamilton Falls Natural Area	Jamaica	Windham	211	85	2015
Hazen's Notch Natural Area	Westfield	Orleans	273	110	1997
Highgate Cliffs Natural Area	Highgate	Franklin	37	15	
Kingsland Bay Natural Area	Ferrisburgh	Addison	50	20	1997
Lake Carmi Bog Natural Area	Enosburg	Franklin	140	57	
Lords Hill Natural Area	Marshfield	Washington	25	10	1977
Lucy Mallary Bugbee Natural Area	Peacham, Danville	Caledonia	12	4.9	
Marl Pond and Swamp Natural Area	Sutton	Caledonia	30	12	1987
Mendon Peak Natural Area	Mendon	Rutland	90	36	1987
Morristown Bog Natural Area	Morristown	Lamoille	30	12	
Moss Glen Falls Natural Area - Granville	Granville	Addison	5	2.0	
Moss Glen Falls Natural Area - Stowe	Stowe	Lamoille	80	32	1983
Mt. Mansfield Natural Area	Bolton, Cambridge, Stowe, Underhill, Waterbury	Chittenden, Lamoille, Washington	3,850	1,560	1968
Peacham Bog Natural Area	Peacham	Caledonia	748	303	1965
Shrewsbury Peak Natural Area	Shrewsbury	Rutland	100	40	1987
Spectacle Pond Natural Area	Brighton	Essex	15	6.1	
Tabletop Mountain Natural Area	Groton	Caledonia	129	52	
Terrible Mountain Natural Area	Weston, Andover	Windsor	798	323	2002
Tinker Brook Natural Area	Plymouth	Windsor	106	43	1965
Weybridge Cave Natural Area	Weybridge	Addison	1	0.40	
Willoughby Cliffs Natural Area	Westmore	Orleans	950	380	1982
Worcester Range Natural Area	Middlesex, Waterbury, Worcester	Washington	4,032	1,632	

=== Map of natural areas on public land ===
Vermont natural areas on public land

== Natural areas on private land in Vermont ==
=== List of natural areas on private land ===
Name	Town	County	Approximate area		Administered by
Name	Town	County	acres	ha	Administered by
Babcock Nature Preserve	Eden	Lamoille	1,000	400	Johnson State College, Vermont State Colleges
Centennial Woods	Burlington, South Burlington	Chittenden	65	26	University of Vermont, Vermont Land Trust
Eshqua Bog Natural Area	Hartland	Windsor	41	17	New England Wild Flower Society, The Nature Conservancy
H. Laurence Achilles Natural Area at Shelburne Pond	Shelburne	Chittenden	1,046	423	University of Vermont, The Nature Conservancy
Helen W. Buckner Memorial Natural Area	West Haven	Rutland	3,791	1,534	The Nature Conservancy
Hogback Mountain Conservation Area	Marlboro	Windham	590	240	The town of Marlboro
Mountain Meadow Preserve	Pownal	Bennington	176	71	The Trustees of Reservations
Shaw Mountain Natural Area	Benson, West Haven	Rutland	451	183	The Nature Conservancy
Williams Woods Natural Area	Charlotte	Chittenden	63	25	The Nature Conservancy

=== Map of natural areas on private land ===
Vermont natural areas on private land

== See also ==
- List of Vermont state parks
- List of Vermont state forests
