= Jim Jeffords State Forest =

State Forest in Rutland County, Vermont, US

- Interactive map of Jim Jeffords State Forest
- Type: State forest
- Location: Mendon and Shrewsbury, Rutland County, Vermont
- Coordinates: 43.5768°N 72.8947°W
- Area: 1,349 acres (5.46 km^{2})
- Created: 2016
- Operator: Vermont Department of Forests, Parks, and Recreation
- Website: Website

Jim Jeffords State Forest covers 1,349 acres (5.46 km^{2}) in Mendon and Shrewsbury, Vermont. The forest connects Aitken State Forest, to the east, and Calvin Coolidge State Forest, to the west, contributing to the conservation of an important wildlife corridor.

Public access to Jim Jeffords State Forest is from Moonshine Lane and North Branch Roads off the Upper Cold River Road in Shrewsbury.

The forest was created in 2016 and named after Shrewsbury resident state senator Jim Jeffords, who was noted for his legacy of environmental stewardship and land conservation. It is managed for recreation, wildlife habitat protection, sustainable timber harvesting, and water quality protection.

Activities in the forest include hiking along woods roads, hunting, fishing and trapping, snowmobiling, cross-country skiing and snowshoeing. No roads are plowed in winter within the state forest.
