= Jay State Forest =

State Forest in Franklin and Orleans counties, Vermont

- Interactive map of Jay State Forest
- Type: State forest
- Location: Franklin and Orleans County, Vermont
- Coordinates: 44.9245°N 72.5257°W
- Area: 7,951 acres (32.18 km^{2})
- Operator: Vermont Department of Forests, Parks, and Recreation
- Website: Website

Jay State Forest covers 7,951 acres (32.18 km^{2}) in two tracts in Jay, Richford, Montgomery and Westfield in Franklin and Orleans counties in Vermont. The forest is managed by the Vermont Department of Forests, Parks, and Recreation.

The forest is divided into two tracts, Black Falls (3,764 acres (15.23 km^{2})) and Big Jay (1,573 acres (6.37 km^{2})), which features Jay Peak and Jay Peak Resort.

Activities include hiking on the Long Trail and skiing at Jay Peak Resort.
