= Steven C. Swett =

American journalist and publisher

- Born: 1934 (age 91–92); Hartford, Connecticut, USA
- Education: B.A.
- Alma mater: Harvard University
- Occupation: Journalist
- Years active: 1956–present
- Relatives: Thomas Welles
- Awards: Gerald Loeb Award; 1961

Steven Carton Swett (born 1934) is an American journalist and publisher who worked for various print publications and received a Gerald Loeb Award.

== Early life ==
Swett was born in 1934 to Catharine (Carton) and Paul P. Swett Jr. in Hartford, Connecticut. Through his mother, Swett is a descendant of Connecticut Colonial Governor Thomas Welles (1594–1660).

Swett attended Milton Academy in Massachusetts. As editor of The Orange and Blue, the school newspaper, Swett received an award in 1952 from The Boston Daily Globe for "best newspaper make-up". He graduated in 1952.

At Harvard University, Swett was a member of the Hasty Pudding Club and the Delphic Club. He was elected to the Harvard Crimson news board in 1953, and served as sports editor before graduating magna cum laude in 1956.

== Career ==
After university, Swett worked briefly for The Baltimore Sun before entering the Army.

In 1961, Swett was part of a team at The Wall Street Journal that received the Gerald Loeb Award for Newspapers.

In the mid-1960s, Swett managed the Education Department at Time, Inc. and served as the education editor.

Swett joined Scholastic Magazines Inc. in 1968 as the promotion director of the Junior-Senior High School Division. In 1976, he was appointed publisher of the newly created educational periodicals division.

Swett began writing for the Valley News in 1988 as a business and financial reporter. He left the West Lebanon, New Hampshire, paper in 1993 to join an investment management firm.

== Personal life ==
Swett married Shiela Lawrence Chanler on October 5, 1957, at St. Matthew's Church in Bedford, New York. Sheila, born December 23, 1935, graduated from Radcliffe College in 1957 and began teaching after they married. They had four children – Benjamin, Sarah, Paul, and Evelyn.

Swett and four friends fulfilled their childhood dream in 1987 by sailing across the Atlantic in a 38-foot yacht from Woods Hole to Scotland. He wrote about his experience in his book Twenty-three Days in the North Atlantic.

In 1999, the couple donated a conservation easement on their 236–acre property near Crescent Lake and Downer State Forest in Vermont to the Upper Valley Land Trust.

Shiela died at their home in Hanover, New Hampshire, on May 20, 2022, after battling multiple myeloma for fifteen years.

== Selected bibliography ==
- "The Test of a Reformer: A Study of Seth Low, New York City Mayor, 1902-1903", New-York Historical Society Quarterly, Vol. 44, No. 1 (1960)
- Twenty-three Days in the North Atlantic, Transatlantic Press (1988)
- Josiah's Journey: Chapters in the Life of The Reverend Josiah Swett, DD, Teacher, Preacher and Poet in 19th Century Vermont, Bragg Hill Press (2010)
- The Metalworkers: Robert Poole, His Ironworks, and Technology in 19th Century America, Baltimore Museum of Industry (2022)
