= Mount Carmel State Forest =

State forest in Vermont, United States

- Interactive map of Mount Carmel State Forest
- Type: State forest
- Location: Chittenden, Rutland County, Vermont
- Coordinates: 43.7711°N 72.9197°W
- Area: 263 acres (1.06 km^{2})
- Created: 1956
- Operator: Vermont Department of Forests, Parks, and Recreation
- Website: Website

Mount Carmel State Forest covers 263 acres (1.06 km^{2}) in Chittenden, Vermont in Rutland County. Located in the Green Mountains, the forest's elevation ranges from 2380 to 3365 feet at the summit of Mount Carmel.

There is no road access to the forest, which can only be accessed by the New Boston Trail, a side trail to the Long Trail. The Long Trail bisects the forest from north to south, and the New Boston Trail accesses the Long Trail from adjacent U.S. Forest Service land in Green Mountain National Forest. The Green Mountain Club maintains the trail. A snowmobile corridor trail is maintained by the Vermont Association of Snow Travelers.

The forest was a gift to the State of Vermont in 1956 from Governor Redfield Proctor. It is managed by the Vermont Department of Forests, Parks, and Recreation.
