= Delphic Club =

Social group at Harvard University, US

- Founded: 1846; 180 years ago Harvard University
- Type: Final club
- Affiliation: Independent
- Status: Active
- Scope: Local
- Motto: "Three times three, long life to thee."
- Symbol: Three torches
- Chapters: 1
- Nickname: The Gashouse
- Headquarters: 9 Linden Street; Cambridge, Massachusetts; United States

- The Delphic Club
- U.S. Historic district – Contributing property
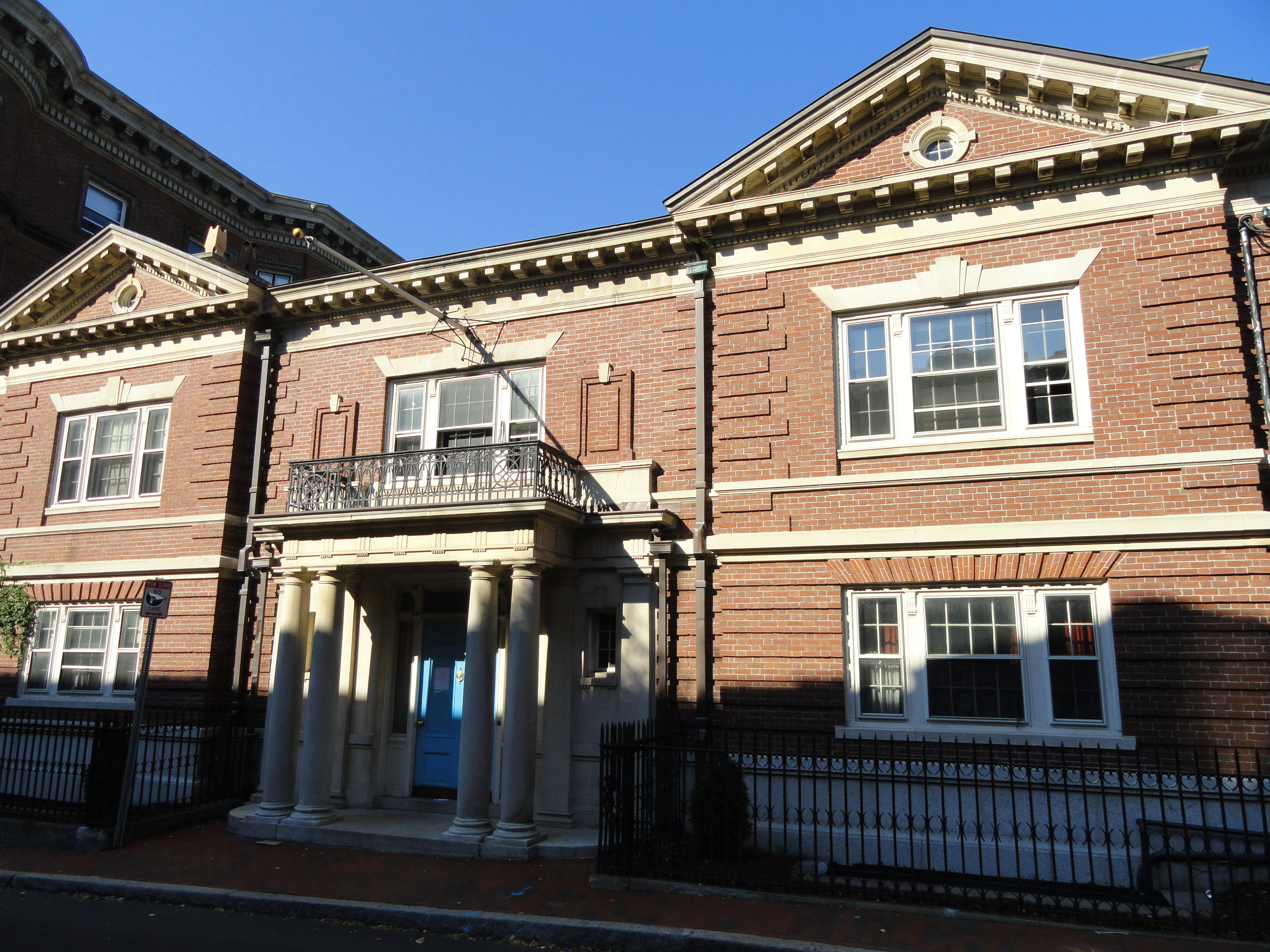

- Location within Massachusetts Location within the United States
- Location: 9 Linden Street Cambridge, MA
- Coordinates: 42°22′20.6″N 71°07′03.1″W
- Built: 1903
- Architect: James Purdon H'1895
- Architectural style: neo-Georgian style
- Part of: Harvard Square Historic District (ID86003654)

The Delphic Club is an all-male final club that was founded in 1846 at Harvard University in Cambridge, Massachusetts. Originally a chapter of Delta Phi, went inactive due to anti-fraternity policies in 1848 and was re-established in 1885. In 1901, it severed ties with the national fraternity and became the Delphic Club final club.

== History ==
The Delphic Club originated in 1845 as an all-male chapter of the Delta Phi fraternity, known as the Alpha of Massachusetts. Twenty members were elected during the chapter's two years of existence. Then, Harvard's faculty forced the fraternity chapter to disband in 1848.

In 1885, the Grand Council of the Delta Phi decided to re-establish a chapter at Harvard known as the Zeta chapter. However, the chapter maintained loose ties with the fraternity. Zeta's members voted to become a Final Club in 1900; it severed ties with the national fraternity in 1901.

A famous, apocryphal story claims that J. P. Morgan Jr. joined Delta Phi when he didn't get into his club of choice and, then, financed the creation of his own club, now known as the Delphic, from the fraternity. However, Morgan did not join The Delphic Club until 1913 and as the group's president the spring semester 1914.

The Delphic is officially recognized by Harvard University. However, it was not recognized or officially affiliated with the university between 1984 and 2018. Ties with Harvard were severed in 1984 as a consequence of the Title IX provision of the U.S. Education Amendments of 1972, which would have required the club to admit female members.

In May 2016, Harvard announced a new sanctions policy that targeted members of single-gender social organizations, effective as of August 2017. The policy prohibited members of single-gender societies and Greek letter organizations from receiving certain scholarships or from serving as an athletic team captain or in campus leadership positions. In August 2017, the Delphic and The Bee Club agreed to share premises as a precursor to an eventual merger, with The Bee Club moving into the Delphic clubhouse at 9 Linden Street. The Bee Club is Harvard's oldest all-female final club, founded in 1991.

In September 2018, Harvard recognized the merged Delphic-Bee Club as a gender-inclusive social organization. As a result, members of the Delphic and Bee were not subject to the college's sanctions policy. Although the two groups shared a clubhouse, they did not merge their punch, or their recruitment processes. The two clubs agreed to separate in August 2020 after Harvard dropped its sanctions policy in response to a lawsuit filed in federal court.

== Symbols and traditions ==
The club's emblem is three torches on a blue field. Its slogan is "Three times three, long life to thee."

In 1885, the fraternity's nickname, The Gashouse, was chosen by the founders Ward Thoron, Herbert Lyman, and Boylston Beal. One version says that The Gashouse name was chosen because the group was small but would light its gas lights after hours to announce that its members were "home". Another version says that the Delta Phi house at 72 Mount Auburn Street was one of the first homes in Cambridge to have electricity and its main switch allowed members light all of the chapter house's windows at once; it was ironically called The Gas House because of its "the absence of gas."

With the opening of the new clubhouse in 1903, after the break from Delta Phi, the members began calling the club The Gas and members were "the gas house gang". This was adopted as the official name in 1908. Soon thereafter, the name was changed to The Delphic Club, a portmanteau of "Delta Phi Club".

== Clubhouse ==
The club was originally located at 52 and 59 Brattle Street in Cambridge before moving to 72 Mount Auburn Street where it was housed from 1887 to 1903. The current home of the club is at 9 Linden Street, steps from Harvard Yard in Harvard Square. It was designed by James Purdon H'1895 in the neo-Georgian style and was first occupied in 1902. Its design features red brick and cornices typical of the Harvard Yard. Its interior contains no living quarters but has regulation squash courts large common spaces and an oversized formal dining room on the second floor for large events. Its basement has a paneled living room for entertaining visitors. It also has a sauna and locker room with showers.

The clubhouse was renovated in 1974-75 for general conditions. A more comprehensive renovation was undertaken in 2013-14, including updating the club's plumbing and electrical systems. The renovation revealed pooled water beneath the club's floor and backyard caused by the destruction of the club's drainage system during the construction of Farkas Hall (aka the Hasty Pudding Clubhouse). This has resulted in litigation between the Delphic Club and Harvard University.

The Delphic Club House is a contributing property to the Harvard Square Historic District.

== Activities ==
The club's traditions include formal, black-tie dinners with alumni and undergraduates and a ban on non-members in the club. The club recruits members through a series of invited dinners and formal dances in a process known as "Punching".

== Notable members ==
- Julian Codman, lawyer who was an opponent of prohibition and was involved with the American Anti-Imperialist League
- Archibald Cox, U.S. Solicitor General and a special prosecutor during the Watergate scandal
- Matt Damon, actor, screenwriter and film producer
- Charles Macomb Flandrau, author and essayist
- William Cameron Forbes, Governor-General of the Philippines and U.S. Ambassador to Japan
- Francis W. Hatch, poet
- Aga Khan IV, 49th Imam of Nizari Ismailism
- Jack Lemmon, actor
- Thomas B. McGrath film and theater producer
- J. P. Morgan Jr., banker, finance executive, and philanthropist
- Chris Ruppenthal, television and film writer
- Sherrod E. Skinner, Jr., Posthumously Awarded the Medal of Honor for actions during the Korean War.
- George Santayana (honorary), philosopher, essayist, poet, and novelist
- Chauncey Stillman, philanthropist, art collector, conservationist, and banking heir
- Steven C. Swett, journalist and publisher
- Adlai Stevenson III, attorney and member of United States Senate from 1970 until 1981
- Hilary Smart, sailor and gold medalist at the 1948 Summer Olympics
- Regis Henri Post, Governor of Puerto Rico
- Frank L. McNamara Jr., United States Attorney for the District of Massachusetts
- Vinton Freedley, theater and television producer
- Raymond Emerson, civil engineer, investment banker, and faculty at the Peabody Museum of Archaeology and Ethnology
- Bronson M. Cutting, United States senator from New Mexico
- Michel de Carvalho, Olympic skier and luger, and child actor in films such as The Brave One, The Tin Star, and Lawrence of Arabia
- Richard E. Byrd III, United States Navy officer, Antarctic explorer, and the son of Admiral Richard E. Byrd (Another REB III who is living is a member; is this an incorrect link?)
- Dick Button, two-time Olympic figure skating champion and five-time world champion
- Chester C. Bolton, U.S. Representative from Ohio
- Edward Streeter is the author of Father of the Bride and a follow up book Father's Little Dividend. These books were the source for the famous 1950 Vincent Minelli movie starring Spencer Tracy, two movies starring Steve Martin and TV series
- John Jacob Astor IV was an American business magnate, real estate developer, investor, writer, lieutenant colonel in the Spanish–American War, and a prominent member of the Astor family

== In literature ==
Stories of The Gas House are recounted by several authors, including Delphic alum Charles Macomb Flandrau in his books Harvard Episodes (1897) and Diary of A Freshman (1901). In Harvard Episodes, Flandrau depicts the multi-generational aspects of the club in describing an old graduate, "If they didn't actually know him, they knew of him. Even this crust is sweet to the returned graduate whose age is just far enough removed from either end of life's measure to make it intrinsically unimportant."

George de la Ruiz Santayana was made an honorary member in 1890 and spent a great deal of time at the Delphic; this is portrayed in Joel Porte's book, Santayana at the Gas (1964). Santayana included the club in several of his poems including "The Judgement of Paris, or, How the First-ten Man Chooses a Club," which concludes with:

Whatever follows: nor, until he die
Will Paris grieve he chose the Delta Phi

At the opening of the new clubhouse on November 20, 1903, Santayana wrote a dedicatory poem to Gas House, which also served as a farewell to the club.

In his novel The Ancient Nine (2006), Ian K. Smith's protagonist is punched by The Delphic Club. Smith notes that the novel is largely autobiographical, telling of his time as a member of The Delphic Club.

== See also ==
- Harvard College social clubs
