= Francis Hatch =

Francis Hatch may refer to:

- Francis W. Hatch (1897–1975), American businessman, writer and philanthropist
- Francis W. Hatch Jr. (1925–2010), his son, member of the Massachusetts House of Representatives
- Francis March Hatch (1852–1923), Hawaii government official
