= King Farm =

- The King Farm
- U.S. National Register of Historic Places
- U.S. Historic district
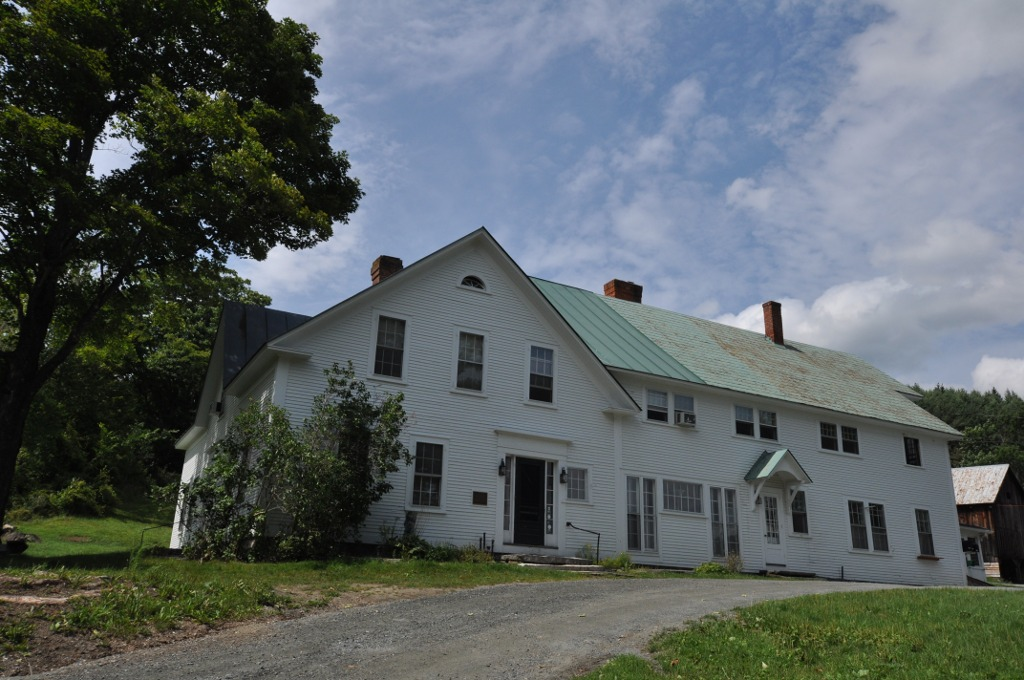

- Location within Vermont Location within the United States
- Location: King Farm Rd., .5 mi. N of jct with US 4, Woodstock, Vermont
- Coordinates: 43°37′11″N 72°32′35″W
- Area: 157 acres (64 ha)
- Built: 1793
- MPS: Agricultural Resources of Vermont MPS
- NRHP reference No.: 97000026
- Added to NRHP: January 31, 1997

The King Farm is a historic farm property at King Farm Road in Woodstock, Vermont. Encompassing more than 150 acres (61 ha) of woodlands and pasture, the farm has 150 years of architectural history, include a rare 18th-century English barn. Originally a subsistence farm, it became a gentleman's farm in the late 19th century, and its farmstead now hosts a regional government commission. The farm was listed on the National Register of Historic Places in 1997.

== Description and history ==
The former King Farm is located about 1 mile (1.6 km) west of Woodstock village, to the north of United States Route 4 and Rose Hill, a loop road on US 4's north side. The farm consists of 157 acres (64 ha), roughly divided equally between cleared and forested land; the cleared land is used either as pasturage or haying. The farmstead is located at the end of King Farm Road, once a through road leading to Barnard but now serving as the farmstead's drive. The complex includes the main house and barn, as well as a sheep barn, horse shed, granary, and workshop, most of which were built before 1900. The main house is a 2 1/2-story wood-frame structure, built about 1793 and enlarged twice during the 19th century. The main barn's oldest portion dates to the same period, consisting of an English barn that has been nearly completely enclosed by additions. The sheep barn, added to the property in 1840, is 1 1/2 stories in height with a shed roof extension on one side.

The farm was cleared and first settled by Jesse Williams, progenitor of a locally prominent family, in the early 1790s, and farmed by him until 1807. Jabez King, a Massachusetts native who had lived in Woodstock for 20 years, purchased the farm from Williams, and four generations of his family would work the land. The farmstead is not only significant for the survival of some of its oldest buildings, but also for the diversity of structures, exemplifying the changes in agricultural and architectural trends. Hiram Udall King, a grandson who made his name in education (founding the King School in Stamford, Connecticut), bought out shares of his siblings and mother in the farm in 1887, transforming it into gentleman's farm and summer retreat. In the early 20th century he added additional living quarters for hands hired to work the land, and added buildings for use by its summer residents and visitors. In 1985, the last of King's descendants died, leaving the remaining land to what is now the Vermont Land Trust.

== See also ==
- National Register of Historic Places listings in Windsor County, Vermont
