= Jay Peak (Vermont) =

Mountain in Vermont, United States

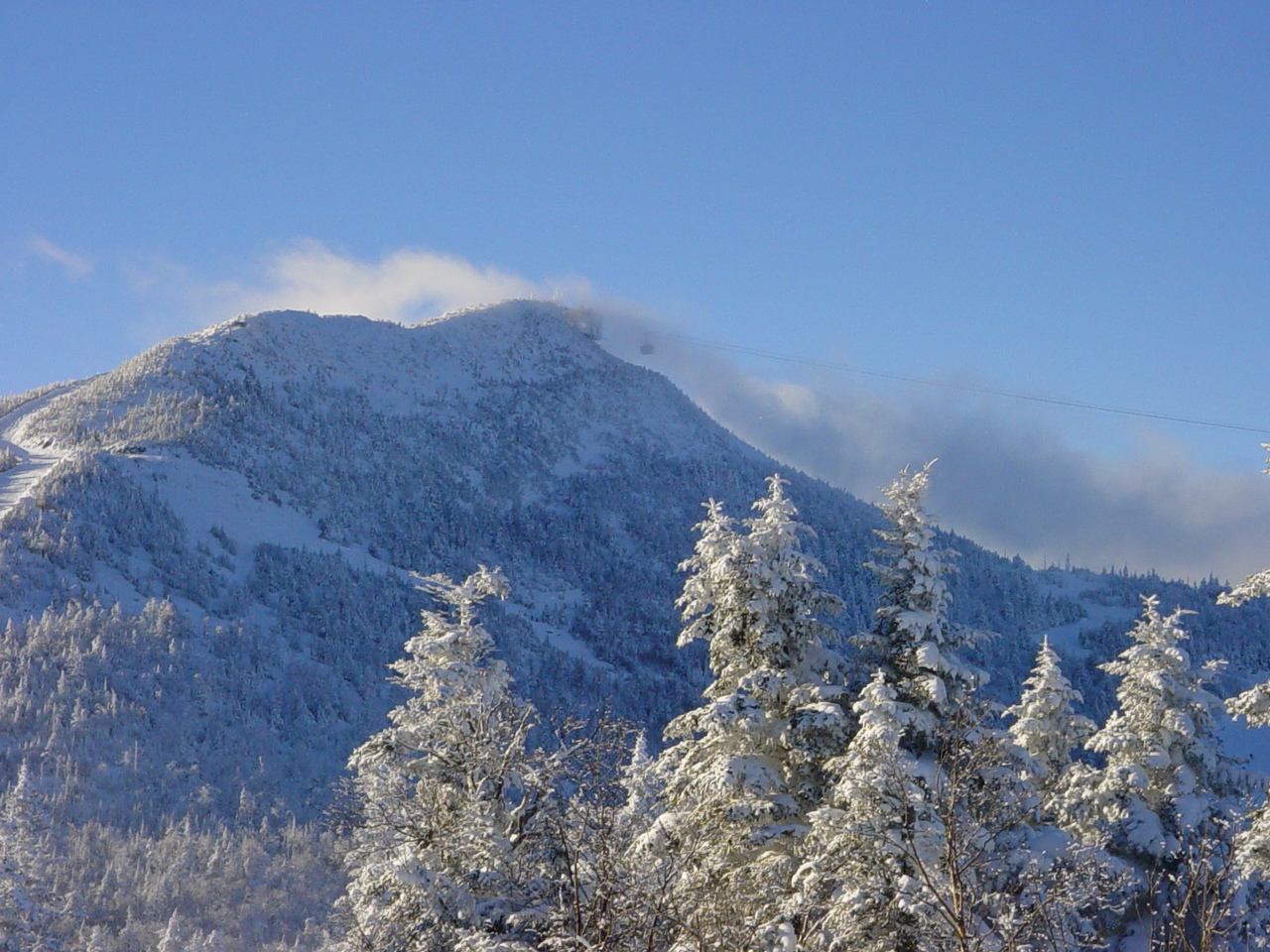
- Jay Peak in January, with an aerial tramway car visible to the right of the summit

Highest point
- Elevation: 3,862 ft (1,177 m)
- Prominence: 2,952 ft (900 m)
- Listing: #8 New England Fifty Finest #81 New England 100 Highest
- Coordinates: 44°55′27″N 72°31′32″W

Geography
- Location: Orleans County, Vermont
- Parent range: Green Mountains
- Topo map: USGS Jay Peak

Climbing
- Easiest route: maintained hiking trail

Jay Peak is a mountain located about 5 miles (8.0 km) south of the Canada–US border, in Jay and Westfield, Orleans County, Vermont, of which it is the highest point. Most of the mountain is in Jay State Forest. The mountain is named for the town of Jay, Vermont, in which much of the mountain except the peak area itself is located.

The town of Jay is in turn named for John Jay, the first Chief Justice of the United States and a local landholder. Jay Peak is part of the northern Green Mountains. The mountain is flanked to the southwest by Big Jay, and to the north by North Jay Peak (3,438 ft / 1,048 m).

The mountain is in the watershed of the Missisquoi River, which drains into Lake Champlain, thence into Canada's Richelieu River, the Saint Lawrence River, and finally into the Gulf of Saint Lawrence. The south side of the mountain drains into Jay Brook, thence west into the Trout River and the Missisquoi River. The northwest side of the mountain drains into Black Falls Brook, and thence into the Trout River. The north and northeast sides of the mountain drain east into the Jay Branch of the Missisquoi River.

Jay Peak is the northernmost major mountain crossed by the Long Trail, a 272-mile (438-km) hiking trail running the length of Vermont. The Jay Peak Resort is on the mountain's northeast side.

== Climate ==
Climate data for Jay Peak 44.9253 N, 72.5253 W, Elevation: 3,419 ft (1,042 m) (1991–2020 normals)
Month	Jan	Feb	Mar	Apr	May	Jun	Jul	Aug	Sep	Oct	Nov	Dec	Year
Mean daily maximum °F (°C)	19.2 (−7.1)	20.7 (−6.3)	28.2 (−2.1)	42.4 (5.8)	56.3 (13.5)	64.4 (18.0)	68.8 (20.4)	67.4 (19.7)	61.4 (16.3)	48.3 (9.1)	34.4 (1.3)	24.7 (−4.1)	44.7 (7.0)
Daily mean °F (°C)	11.2 (−11.6)	12.8 (−10.7)	20.7 (−6.3)	34.1 (1.2)	47.7 (8.7)	56.8 (13.8)	61.5 (16.4)	60.0 (15.6)	53.5 (11.9)	41.0 (5.0)	28.1 (−2.2)	17.9 (−7.8)	37.1 (2.8)
Mean daily minimum °F (°C)	3.2 (−16.0)	4.9 (−15.1)	13.3 (−10.4)	25.7 (−3.5)	39.2 (4.0)	49.2 (9.6)	54.2 (12.3)	52.7 (11.5)	45.5 (7.5)	33.6 (0.9)	21.8 (−5.7)	11.1 (−11.6)	29.5 (−1.4)
Average precipitation inches (mm)	4.69 (119)	5.00 (127)	5.53 (140)	4.59 (117)	5.72 (145)	6.70 (170)	6.46 (164)	6.18 (157)	5.60 (142)	7.23 (184)	5.66 (144)	6.96 (177)	70.32 (1,786)
Source: PRISM Climate Group

== History ==
On November 10, 1943, a Royal Canadian Air Force training plane crashed into the west side of the mountain near the top during a blinding snowfall killing one crew member.

In the mid-1950s brothers Ernest W. Gilpin and Wallace H. Gilpin, both state legislators and newspaper men, began and achieved their campaign to construct a highway over the south flank of Jay Peak, to connect Troy to Montgomery, Vermont. The Starr family of Troy donated portions of land for the right-of-way for the Vermont Route 242 construction.

The peaks across the highway to the south are named for the brothers Gilpin, "Gilpin Mountain", a stone monument, was dedicated to them and sits at the main entrance to Jay Peak Resort at the highway.

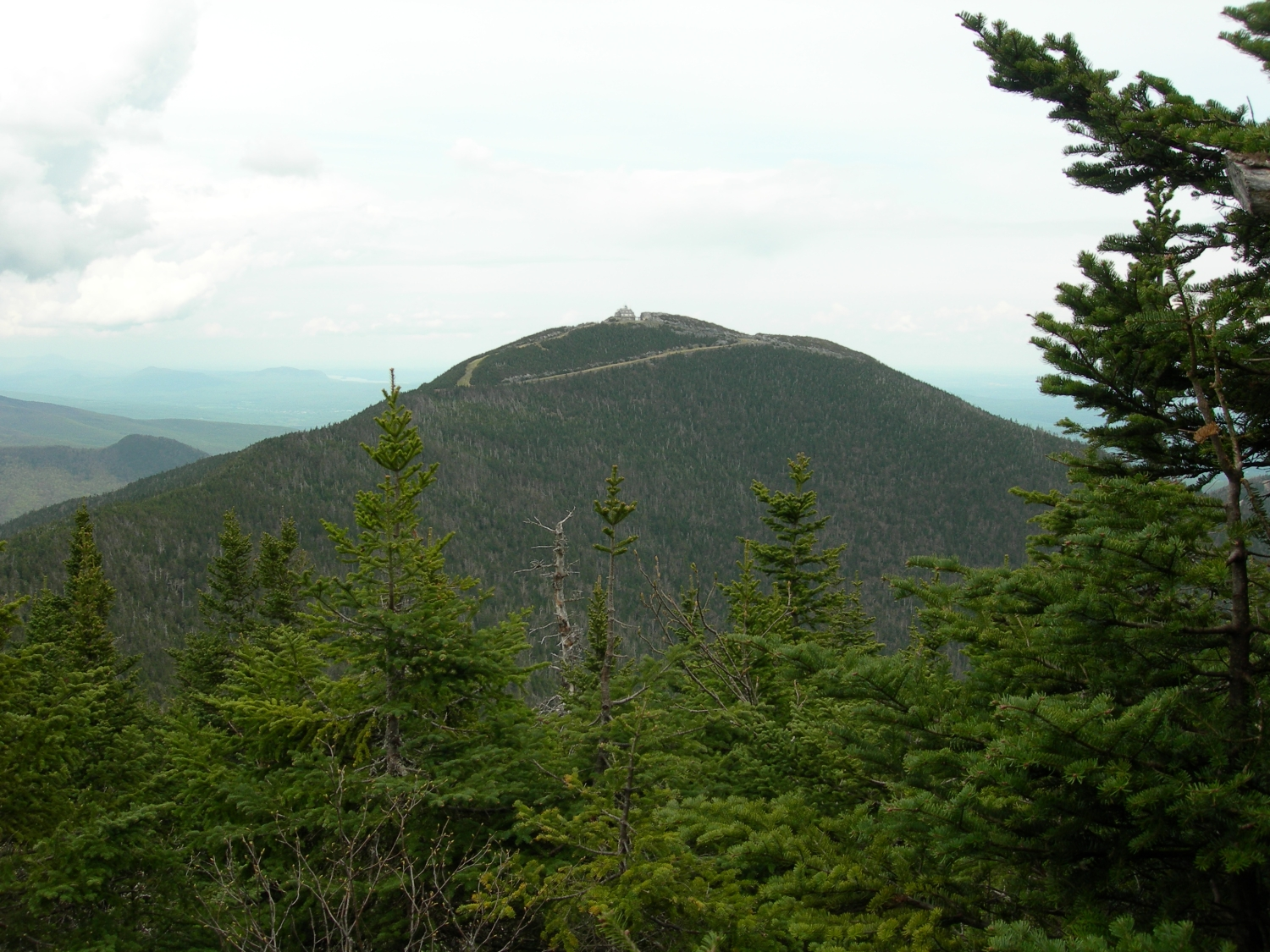
Jay Peak seen from Big Jay

== See also ==
- List of mountains in Vermont
- New England Fifty Finest
- New England Hundred Highest
- Jay Peak Resort
