= List of Vermont state forests =

This is a list of state forests in the U.S. state of Vermont. Vermont state forests are managed by the Vermont Department of Forests, Parks and Recreation.

== List of state forests in Vermont ==
Name	County
Aitken State Forest	Rutland
Arlington State Forest	Bennington
Black Turn Brook State Forest	Essex
Boyer State Forest	Washington
Calvin Coolidge State Forest	Rutland, Windsor
Cambridge State Forest	Lamoille
Camel's Hump State Forest	Chittenden
Dorand State Forest	Windham
Downer State Forest	Windsor
Essex Nursery	Windsor
Granville Gulf Reservation	Addison
Groton State Forest	Caledonia, Orange, Washington
Hapgood State Forest	Bennington
Jay State Forest	Orleans
Jim Jeffords State Forest	Rutland
Jones State Forest	Washington
Long Trail State Forest	Franklin, Lamoille, Orleans
Lord State Forest	Windsor
Lower Clarendon Gorge State Forest	Rutland
Lyndon State Forest	Caledonia
Mathewson State Forest	Caledonia
Mollie Beattie State Forest	Windham
Mount Carmel State Forest	Rutland
Mount Cushman State Forest	Windsor
Mount Mansfield State Forest	Lamoille
Okemo State Forest	Rutland
Proctor-Piper State Forest	Windsor
Putnam State Forest	Washington
Roxbury State Forest	Washington
Rupert State Forest	Bennington
Thetford Hill State Forest	Orange
Townshend State Forest	Windham
Victory State Forest	Essex
Washington State Forest	Orange
West Rutland State Forest	Rutland
William C. Putnam State Forest	Windham
Williams River State Forest	Windsor
Willoughby State Forest	Caledonia

== Map of state forests in Vermont ==
Vermont State Forests

== See also ==
- List of Vermont state parks
- List of Vermont natural areas
