= Williams River State Forest =

- Interactive map of Williams River State Forest
- Type: State forest
- Location: Chester, Windham County, Vermont
- Coordinates: 43.2333°N 72.6695°W
- Area: 108 acres (0.44 km^{2})
- Operator: Vermont Department of Forests, Parks, and Recreation
- Website: Website

Williams River State Forest covers 108 acres (0.44 km^{2}) in Chester in Windham County, Vermont. The forest is managed by the Vermont Department of Forests, Parks, and Recreation.

Activities in the forest include hiking, snowshoeing, hunting and wildlife viewing.

The south branch of Williams River (Vermont) flows along the edge of the forest.
