= Townshend State Forest =

State forest in Townshend, Vermont, United States

- Interactive map of Townshend State Forest
- Type: State forest
- Location: Townshend, Windham County, Vermont
- Coordinates: 43.041°N 72.692°W
- Area: 1,106 acres (4.48 km^{2})
- Created: 1912
- Operator: Vermont Department of Forests, Parks, and Recreation
- Website: Website

Townshend State Forest covers 1,106 acres (4.48 km^{2}) in Townshend, Vermont in Windham County. The forest is managed by the Vermont Department of Forests, Parks, and Recreation and surrounds 18-acre Townshend State Park, which hosts trails and camping facilities.

Activities in the forest include hiking, snowshoeing and hunting.
