= Jay, Vermont =

- Town
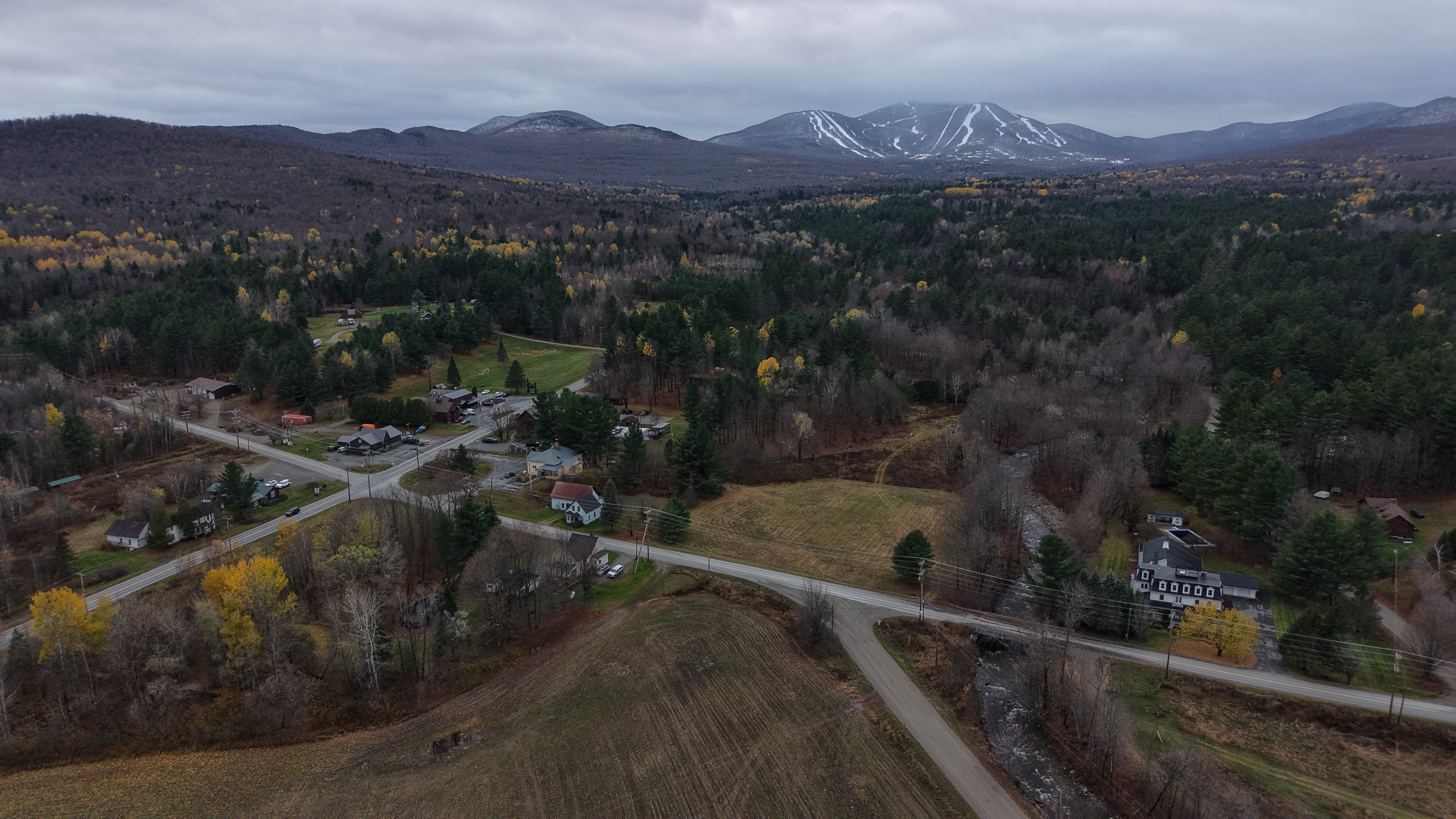
- Jay, VT, from the west

- Seal

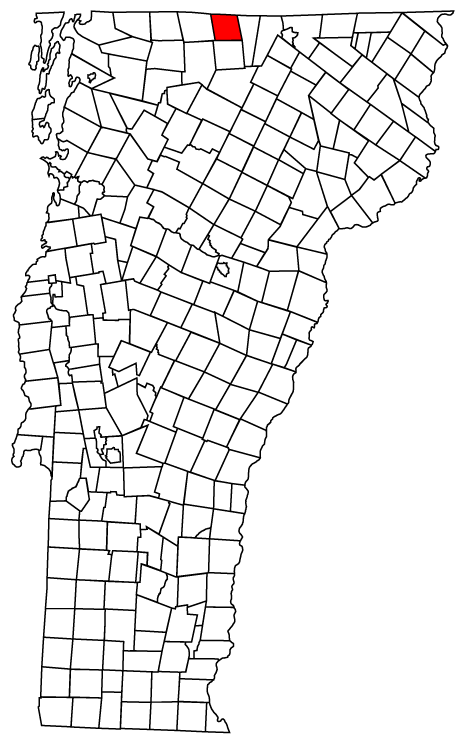
- Located in Orleans County, Vermont
- Coordinates: 44°58′50″N 72°29′35″W
- Country: United States
- State: Vermont
- County: Orleans
- Chartered: November 7, 1792
- Organized: March 29, 1828

Area
  - Total: 34.0 sq mi (88.0 km^{2})
  - Land: 33.9 sq mi (87.9 km^{2})
  - Water: 0.039 sq mi (0.1 km^{2})
- Elevation: 1,490 ft (450 m)

Population (2020)
  - Total: 551
  - Density: 16/sq mi (6.3/km^{2})
- Time zone: UTC-5 (EST)
  - Summer (DST): UTC-4 (EDT)
- ZIP code: 05859
- Area code: 802
- FIPS code: 50-36325
- GNIS feature ID: 1462127
- Website: www.jayvt.com

Jay is one of the northernmost towns in Orleans County, Vermont, United States, located on the Canada–US border. The population was 551 at the 2020 census. Jay is named for John Jay, one of the Founding Fathers of the United States. The US Census Bureau estimated that the town's population had increased by 13.1% between 2000 and 2005, the seventh largest increase in the state. Jay is also home to the Jay Challenge, a three-part stage-race, typically held in July.

== History ==
On November 10, 1943, a Royal Canadian Air Force training plane crashed into the west side of the mountain near the top during a blinding snowfall killing one crew member.

== Geography ==
According to the United States Census Bureau, the town has a total area of 34.0 square miles (88 km^{2}), of which 33.9 square miles (88 km^{2}) is land and 0.04 square miles (0.10 km^{2}) (0.12%) is water.

The highest point in town is North Jay Peak at 3,438 feet (1,048 m) above sea level. Despite their containing the name "Jay", other peaks with this name lie mostly in adjacent Westfield, including Jay Peak itself and Jay Peak Resort.

The local Jay Branch Brook flows into the Missisquoi River.

=== Climate ===
Climate data for Jay Peak, Vermont, 1991–2020 normals, 1988–2014 extremes: 1840ft (561m)
Month	Jan	Feb	Mar	Apr	May	Jun	Jul	Aug	Sep	Oct	Nov	Dec	Year
Record high °F (°C)	59 (15)	60 (16)	73 (23)	83 (28)	85 (29)	89 (32)	89 (32)	88 (31)	87 (31)	76 (24)	67 (19)	64 (18)	89 (32)
Mean daily maximum °F (°C)	23.6 (−4.7)	25.5 (−3.6)	33.5 (0.8)	46.0 (7.8)	60.9 (16.1)	69.5 (20.8)	73.7 (23.2)	72.2 (22.3)	65.7 (18.7)	52.2 (11.2)	39.5 (4.2)	29.4 (−1.4)	49.3 (9.6)
Daily mean °F (°C)	13.9 (−10.1)	15.6 (−9.1)	24.1 (−4.4)	36.8 (2.7)	51.0 (10.6)	60.2 (15.7)	64.7 (18.2)	63.2 (17.3)	55.9 (13.3)	43.4 (6.3)	31.7 (−0.2)	21.0 (−6.1)	40.1 (4.5)
Mean daily minimum °F (°C)	4.2 (−15.4)	5.7 (−14.6)	14.7 (−9.6)	27.7 (−2.4)	41.1 (5.1)	50.9 (10.5)	55.7 (13.2)	54.1 (12.3)	46.1 (7.8)	34.6 (1.4)	23.8 (−4.6)	12.7 (−10.7)	30.9 (−0.6)
Record low °F (°C)	−32 (−36)	−33 (−36)	−22 (−30)	−2 (−19)	23 (−5)	32 (0)	34 (1)	31 (−1)	16 (−9)	12 (−11)	−10 (−23)	−28 (−33)	−33 (−36)
Average precipitation inches (mm)	5.07 (129)	4.26 (108)	3.67 (93)	4.27 (108)	5.91 (150)	5.83 (148)	6.09 (155)	6.12 (155)	5.29 (134)	6.64 (169)	5.49 (139)	6.18 (157)	64.82 (1,645)
Source: NOAA (precip 1981–2010)

== Government ==
- Selectmen
  - Michael Brady (2009)
  - Mark Burroughs-Biron (2010)
- Listers
  - Arlene Bosco
  - Ron Kapeluck
  - Fred Cushing
- Tax Collector – Cindy Vincent
- Auditor – Edna Cushing
- Town Agent and Grand Juror – Roger Morin
- School Board
  - Kimberly Arnold
  - Molly Docktor
  - Jeffrey Morse

== Demographics ==
Historical population
Census	Pop.	Note	%±
1810	28		—
1820	52		85.7%
1830	196		276.9%
1840	306		56.1%
1850	371		21.2%
1860	474		27.8%
1870	553		16.7%
1880	696		25.9%
1890	641		−7.9%
1900	530		−17.3%
1910	513		−3.2%
1920	368		−28.3%
1930	274		−25.5%
1940	230		−16.1%
1950	243		5.7%
1960	197		−18.9%
1970	182		−7.6%
1980	302		65.9%
1990	381		26.2%
2000	426		11.8%
2010	521		22.3%
2020	551		5.8%
U.S. Decennial Census

As of the census of 2010, there were 595 people, 276 households, and 215 families residing in the town. The population density was 15.4 people per square mile (5.9/km^{2}). There were 685 housing units at an average density of 20.2 per square mile (7.8/km^{2}). The racial makeup of the town was 96.9% White, 0.8% Native American, 0.6% Asian, and 1.7% from two or more races. Hispanic or Latino of any race were 0.6% of the population.

There were 276 households, out of which 43.0% had children under the age of 18 living with them, 63.7% were married couples living together, 9.9% had a female householder living alone, and 26.3% were non-families. 25.6% of all households were made up of individuals. The average household size was 2.34 and the average family size was 2.80.

In the town, the population was spread out, with 22.5% under the age of 18, 3.8% from 20 to 24, 28.9% from 25 to 44, 32.3% from 45 to 64, and 12.5% who were 65 years of age or older. The median age was 41.3 years. For every 100 females, there were 104.8 males. For every 100 females, there were 109 males.

The median income for a household in the town was $43,958, and the median income for a family was $48,594. The per capita income for the town was $20,058. About 7.4% of families and 12.2% of the population were below the poverty line, including 14.0% of those under age 18 and 10.4% of those age 65 or over.
