= Calvin Coolidge State Forest =

State Forest in Rutland and Windsor counties, Vermont

- Interactive map of Calvin Coolidge State Forest
- Type: State forest
- Location: Mendon, Rutland County, Vermont
- Coordinates: 43.5834°N 72.9285°W
- Area: 22,564 acres (91.31 km^{2})
- Created: 1925
- Operator: Vermont Department of Forests, Parks, and Recreation
- Website: Website

Calvin Coolidge State Forest, also known as Coolidge State Forest, covers 22,564 acres (91.31 km^{2}) in two parts in Rutland and Windsor counties in Vermont. The West portion cover 17,259 acres (69.84 km^{2}) in Killington, Mendon, Plymouth and Shrewsbury in both counties. The East portion cover 5,305 acres (21.47 km^{2}) in Bridgewater, Plymouth, Reading, and Woodstock in Windsor County.

The forest is managed by the Vermont Department of Forests, Parks, and Recreation for timber resources, wildlife habitat, and recreational activities.

Activities in the forest include camping, hiking, picnicking, fishing, hunting, trapping, snowshoeing, cross-country skiing and snowmobiling.

== East section ==
Coolidge State Park in the East section in Plymouth is the most developed and primary recreational center for the forest, and features a campground. The park's facilities were built by the Civilian Conservation Corps (CCC) in the 1930s, and are listed on the National Register of Historic Places.

There are several remote lean-tos, primitive camping areas, and gold panning. The Vermont Association of Snow Travelers (VAST) grooms an extensive network of road and trails for snowmobiling in the winter. There are also hunting opportunities for game species such as deer, moose, and ruffed grouse.

The CCC built many of the roads in the East section.

In the East, the forests are typically hardwood and often steep, and are actively managed for timber.

== West ==
The West section features many hiking trails, including the Shrewsbury Peak Trail, Tinker Brook Trail, Bucklin Trail and portions of the Long Trail and Appalachian Trail. There are trails for snowmobiling and cross-country skiing, as well as snowshoeing. Hunting, fishing and trapping occurs in this section.

The West section of Calvin Coolidge State Forest is located along the Green Mountains ridgeline and features many high forested mountain peaks, including Killington Peak, Little Killington, Shrewsbury, Saltash, Mendon and Smith peaks.

There are three designated Vermont State Natural Areas – Tinker Brook Natural Area (106 acres) in Plymouth, Shrewsbury Peak Natural Area (100 acres) in Shrewsbury, and Mendon Peak Natural Area (90 acres in the state-owned portion above 3200 feet) in Mendon.
