= Mount Cushman State Forest =

- Interactive map of Mount Cushman State Forest
- Type: State forest
- Location: Rochester, Windsor County, Vermont
- Coordinates: 43.8978°N 72.7655°W
- Area: 16 acres (0.065 km^{2})
- Operator: Vermont Department of Forests, Parks, and Recreation
- Website: Website

Mount Cushman State Forest covers 16 acres (0.065 km^{2}) in Rochester, Vermont in Windsor County. The forest is managed by the Vermont Department of Forests, Parks, and Recreation. It is landlocked and there is no legal public access to the forest.
