= Lower Clarendon Gorge State Forest =

State Forest in Rutland County, Vermont

- Interactive map of Lower Clarendon Gorge State Forest
- Type: State forest
- Location: Clarendon, Rutland County, Vermont
- Coordinates: 43.516°N 72.964°W
- Area: 73 acres (0.30 km^{2})
- Operator: Vermont Department of Forests, Parks, and Recreation
- Website: Website

Lower Clarendon Gorge State Forest, also known as Lower Clarendon Gorge State Park, covers 73 acres (0.30 km^{2}) around Lower Clarendon Gorge on Mill River in Clarendon, Vermont. The site was donated to the state by the Vermont River Conservancy in the 2000s.

There are hiking trails along the scenic gorge and a pedestrian bridge.
