= Centennial Woods =

Natural area in Vermont, United States

Coordinates: 44.478°N 73.184°W

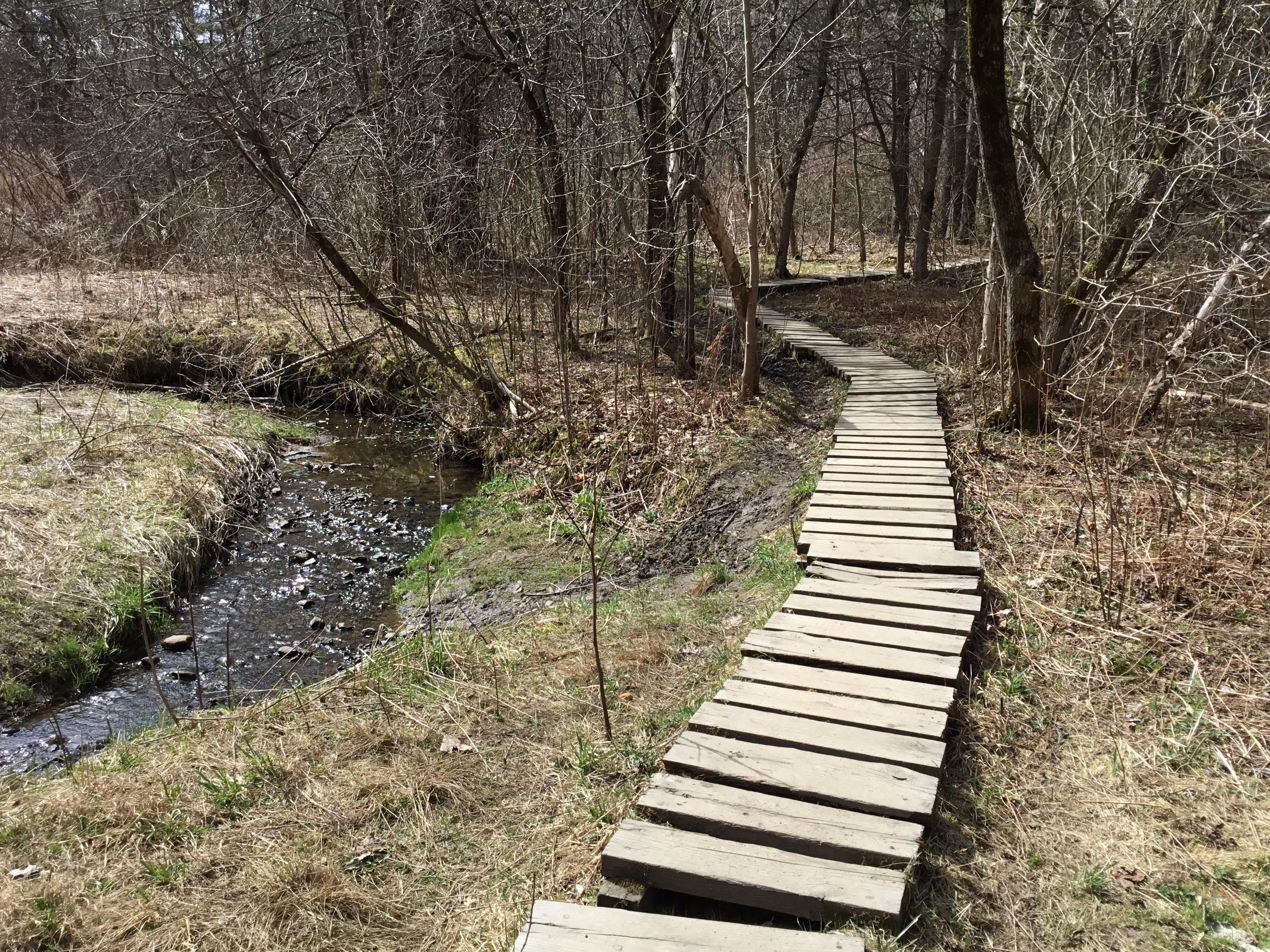
- One of the trails in Centennial Woods
- Interactive map of Centennial Woods
- Type: Natural area
- Location: Burlington, Vermont, United States
- Area: 65 acres (26 ha)
- Operator: Vermont Land Trust

Centennial Woods is a 65-acre natural area adjacent to the University of Vermont in Burlington, Vermont. It contains a variety of different plants and wildlife, as well as several miles of hiking trails. The woods are managed by the Vermont Land Trust, although it existed as private property for many years before it became available to public recreation.

== History ==
Since the early 20th century, Centennial Woods passed through the hands of a variety of private landowners before it came to belong to the Vermont Land Trust. The river which flows through the park, called Centennial Brook, has been an object of concern among ecologists because of its water quality, particularly during a 75-gallon oil spill which occurred in 1982.

== Features ==
The Woods, which were originally used as farmland by many of their private owners, have since grown back a variety of natural habitats. It has areas of forest and marshland interspersed with more developed areas, including a string of power lines which run down the center of the park. It formerly offered ski facilities in the winter, although these have since been closed down. Although the terrain is fairly hilly, it contains a variety of bridges and maintained trails to make it more navigable.

== Flora and fauna ==
The plant life found in Centennial Woods includes pines, hemlock trees, and horsetail. It also contains several beaver dams and a variety of local animals.
