= Boyer State Forest =

State Forest in Washington County, Vermont

- Interactive map of Boyer State Forest
- Type: State forest
- Location: Berlin, Washington County, Vermont
- Coordinates: 44.2042°N 72.61955°W
- Area: 354 acres (1.43 km^{2})
- Created: 1986
- Operator: Vermont Department of Forests, Parks, and Recreation
- Website: Website

Boyer State Forest covers 354 acres (1.43 km^{2}) in Berlin, Vermont in Washington County. The forest is managed by the Vermont Department of Forests, Parks, and Recreation.

Activities in the forest include hiking, mountain biking, cross-country skiing, snowshoeing, hunting and wildlife viewing.
