= Lyndon State Forest =

State forest in Caledonia County, Vermont

- Interactive map of Lyndon State Forest
- Type: State forest
- Location: Lyndon, Vermont
- Coordinates: 44.4997°N 71.9920°W
- Area: 72 acres (0.29 km^{2})
- Created: 1912
- Operator: Vermont Department of Forests, Parks, and Recreation
- Website: Website

Lyndon State Forest covers 72 acres (0.29 km^{2}) in Lyndon, Vermont in Caledonia County. The forest is managed by the Vermont Department of Forests, Parks, and Recreation for timber resources and wildlife habitat.

Activities in the park include bird watching, hunting, snowshoeing, berry picking, and cross country skiing.
