= Big Jay =

Mountain in Vermont, United States

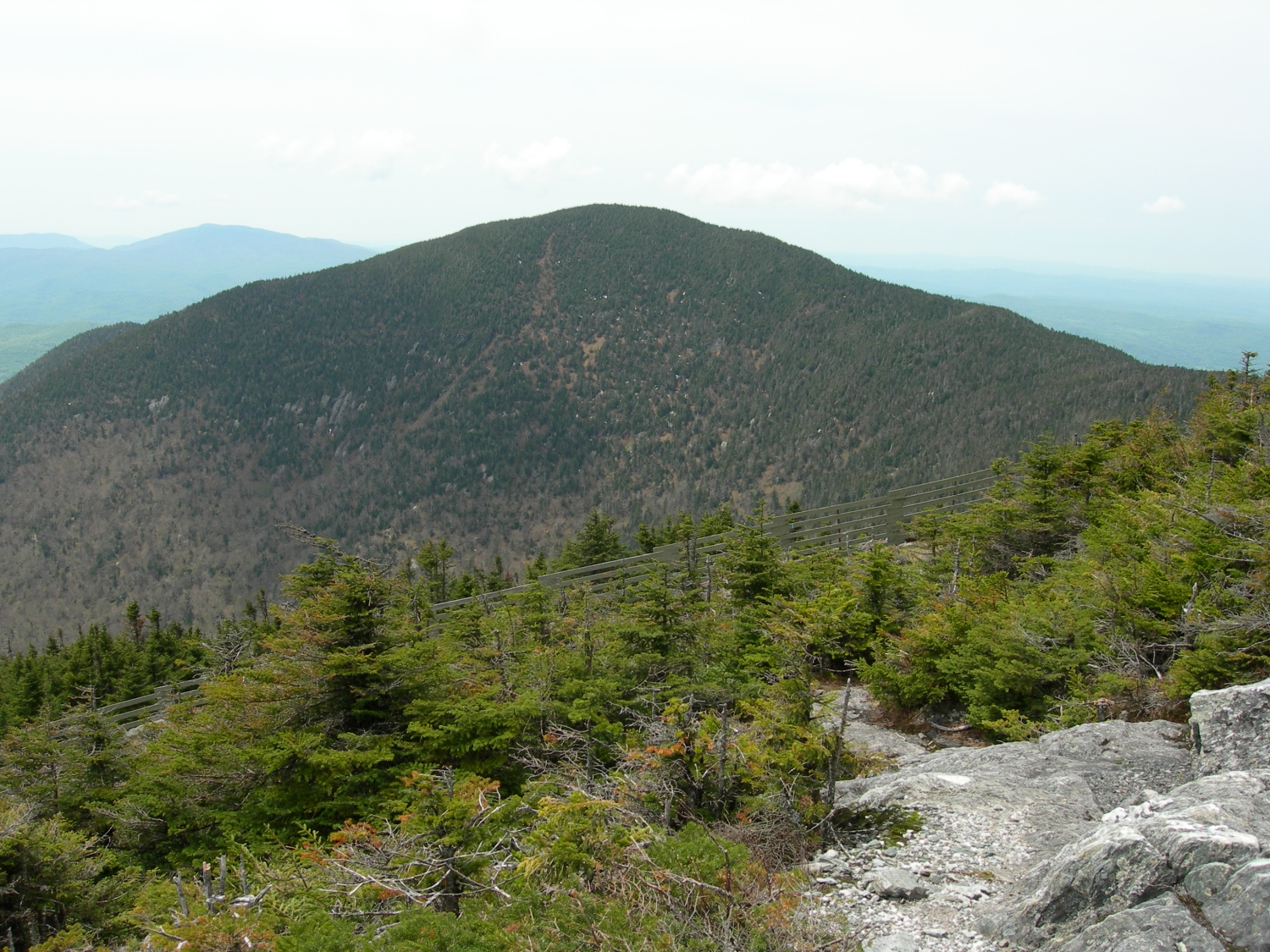
- Big Jay, seen from Jay Peak

Highest point
- Elevation: 3,786 ft (1,154 m) NGVD 29
- Prominence: 380 ft (120 m)
- Listing: New England 100 Highest
- Coordinates: 44°54′57″N 72°32′25″W

Geography
- Location within Vermont
- Location: Orleans and Franklin, counties Vermont, U.S.
- Parent range: Green Mountains
- Topo map: USGS Jay Peak

Climbing
- Easiest route: Unmaintained hiking trail

Big Jay is a 3,786-foot (1,154 m) mountain in the northern Green Mountains of Vermont, located on the border of Franklin and Orleans counties.

The summit of Big Jay is the highest point of Franklin County. Big Jay is flanked to the south by Little Jay (3,182 ft or 970 m), and to the northeast by Jay Peak (3,865 ft or 1,178 m), the highest summit of the Jay Peak complex. Jay Peak is named for John Jay (1745–1829) of New York, one of the founding fathers of the United States.

Big Jay stands within the watershed of the Trout River, a tributary of the Missisquoi River, which drains into Lake Champlain, thence into Canada's Richelieu River, the Saint Lawrence River, and into the Gulf of Saint Lawrence. The east and southeast sides of Big Jay drain into Jay Brook, which joins the South Branch Trout River in Montgomery to form the Trout River. The southwest and western sides of Big Jay drain into Hannah Clark Brook, and thence into the Trout. The northern end of Big Jay drains into Black Falls Brook, and thence into the Trout.

There is no official hiking trail on Big Jay, although there is a herd path to the summit from Jay Peak. There is also a summit register. In the summer of 2007 two men cut an illegal ski trail several hundred yards down the eastern side of the protected habitat. The offense carries a maximum $5,000 fine and five years in jail. Hikers and skiers have been encouraged to stay away from the scar caused by the vandalism so that the area can recover.

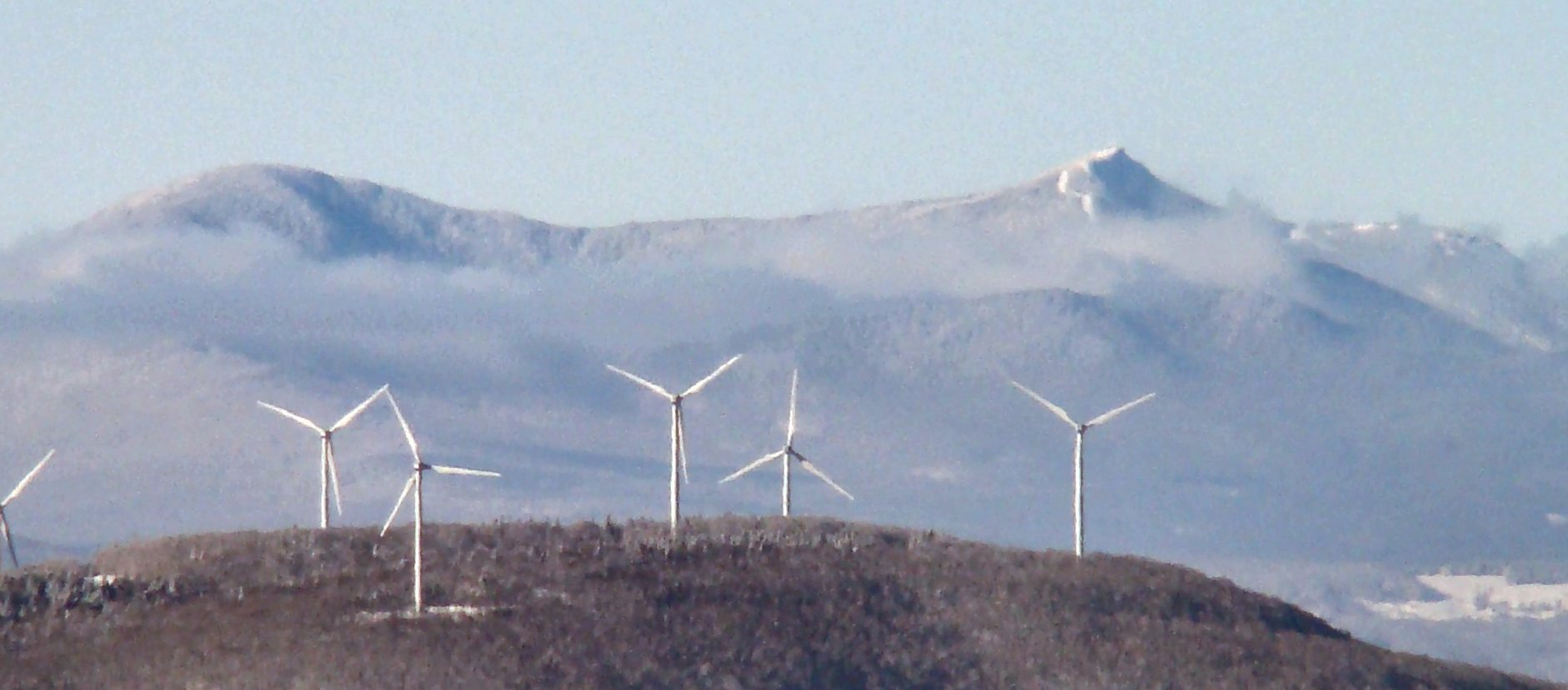
View of Big Jay (left) and Jay Peak (right) from Burke Mountain. The turbines of the Sheffield wind farm are in the foreground.

== See also ==
- List of mountains in Vermont
- New England Hundred Highest
