= Coolidge State Park =

State park in Windsor County, Vermont

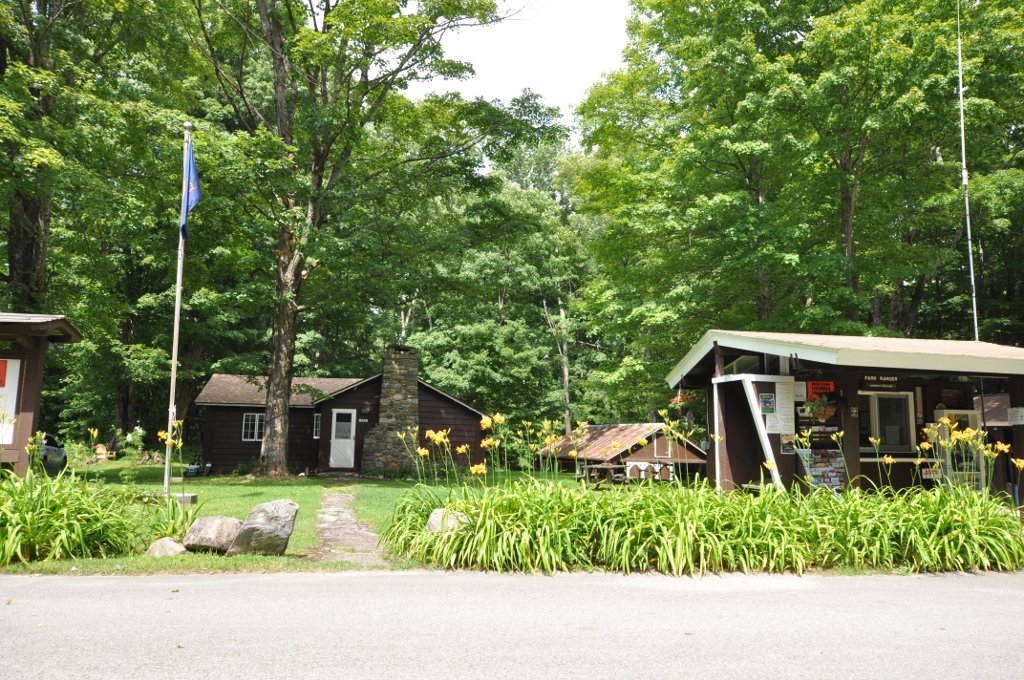
- Ranger station and other administrative buildings

- Location within Vermont
- Interactive map of Coolidge State Park
- Location: Plymouth, Vermont, United States
- Coordinates: 43°33′11″N 72°42′01″W
- Area: 1,300 acres (530 ha)
- Established: 1925
- Administrator: Vermont Department of Forests, Parks, and Recreation
- Website: Official website
- Vermont State Parks
- Coolidge State Park
- U.S. National Register of Historic Places
- U.S. Historic district
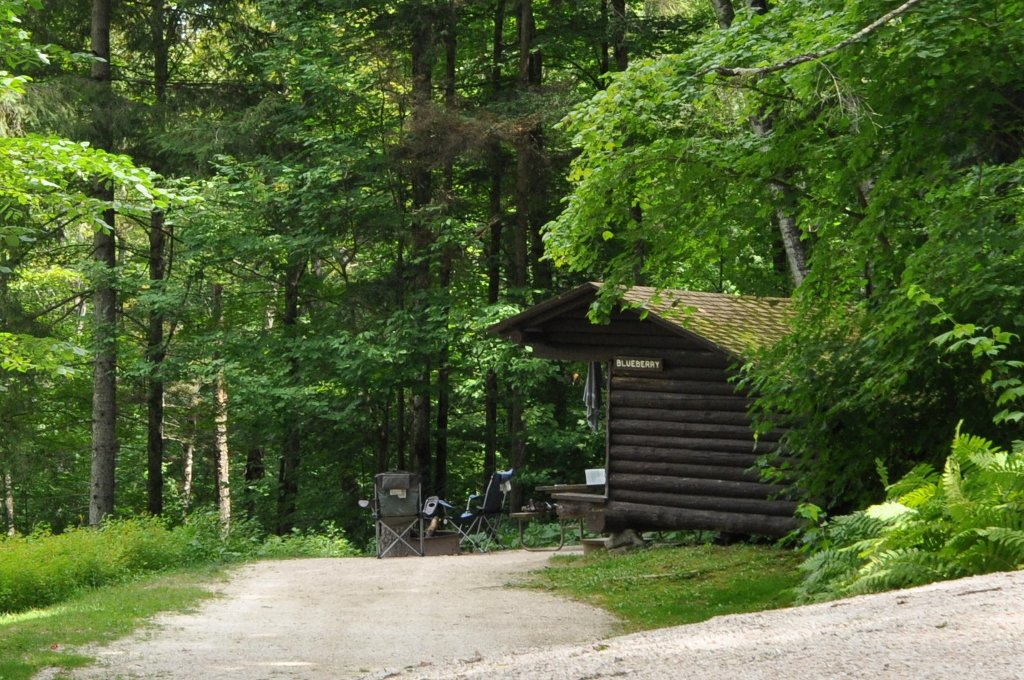
- Lean-to
- MPS: Historic Park Landscapes in National and State Parks MPS
- NRHP reference No.: 02000281
- Added to NRHP: March 29, 2002

Coolidge State Park is a Vermont state park located in Plymouth, Vermont, United States. The park is named after Calvin Coolidge, the 30th President of the United States, who was born and raised in Plymouth and is buried there as well. It is the primary recreational center for Calvin Coolidge State Forest, the largest state forest in Vermont. The park's facilities, built by the Civilian Conservation Corps (CCC) in the 1930s, are listed on the National Register of Historic Places. Activities in the park include camping, hiking, picnicking, mountain biking, stream fishing, wildlife watching and winter sports.

== Geography and landscape ==
Coolidge State Park is located in Windsor County, Vermont, in central Vermont, and consists of two land areas, one on each side of Vermont Route 100A, about 2 miles (3.2 km) north of Plymouth Notch, the birthplace of Calvin Coolidge. The park's total area is 1,300 acres (530 ha), and it is flanked in part by eastern sections of the 21,000-acre (8,500 ha) Calvin Coolidge State Forest. The western section, or Pinney Hollow block, is 800 acres (320 ha) in size, and houses the park maintenance facilities, located at the site of the CCC camp where workers who built the park lived. The eastern section, or Bradley Hill block, is a large wooded parcel on the western slope of Slack Hill (which has a 2174-foot summit). The park contact station, campground, and picnic areas are located in this section. The terrain is generally steep, but there is a level area where the contact station and main parking area are located.

== History ==
Prior to the establishment of the state forest and state park, land that makes up the park saw a variety of agricultural and light industrial uses. In the 1920s, the state began purchasing land for the state forest, and considered the area north of Plymouth Notch a good candidate for a campground and other recreational amenities. With federal funding made available for CCC works in 1933, work on the park facilities began. The main access road was cut, and the leanto camping loop was built, as were the picnic and maintenance facilities, and the contact station. Areas that had formerly been in agricultural use were planted with trees, and the CCC crews also cut some of the area's hiking trails. They also built a small swimming hole just west of VT 100A by damming Pinney Hollow Brook; this site is no longer in use.

== Facilities ==
Near the park access road on VT 100A is a small parking and picnic area. The main access road climbs steeply to the contact station, from which a camping loop composed entirely of lean-tos branches off. This loop road roughly follows the contours of the hill, and the lean-tos are placed to provide views of the surrounding countryside. Continuing down the main access road, there is a second wooded camping loop for the use of tent campers and recreational vehicles; there are no sanitary or electrical connections here, but a dump station is located near the contact station. Beyond the tent loop is a larger picnic area with CCC-built pavilions.

== See also ==
- National Register of Historic Places listings in Windsor County, Vermont
