= Dorand State Forest =

State Forest in Windham County, Vermont

- Interactive map of Dorand State Forest
- Type: State forest
- Location: Grafton and Rockingham, Windham County, Vermont
- Coordinates: 43.1998°N 72.5529°W
- Area: 531 acres (2.15 km^{2})
- Operator: Vermont Department of Forests, Parks, and Recreation
- Website: Website

Dorand State Forest, also known as John Dorand State Forest, covers 531 acres (2.15 km^{2}) in Grafton and Rockingham in Windham County, Vermont. The forest is managed by the Vermont Department of Forests, Parks, and Recreation.

Activities in the forest include hiking, hunting, fishing, snowshoeing, trapping and wildlife viewing.
