= Lord State Forest =

State Forest in Windsor County, Vermont

- Interactive map of Lord State Forest
- Type: State forest
- Location: Cavendish, Windsor County, Vermont
- Coordinates: 43.4212°N 72.5513°W
- Area: 64 acres (0.26 km^{2})
- Operator: Vermont Department of Forests, Parks, and Recreation
- Website: Website

Lord State Forest, also known as Albert C. Lord State Forest, covers 64 acres (0.26 km^{2}) in Cavendish, Vermont in Windsor County. The forest is managed by the Vermont Department of Forests, Parks, and Recreation.

Activities in the forest include hunting and snowshoeing.
