= Townshend State Park =

State park in Windham County, Vermont

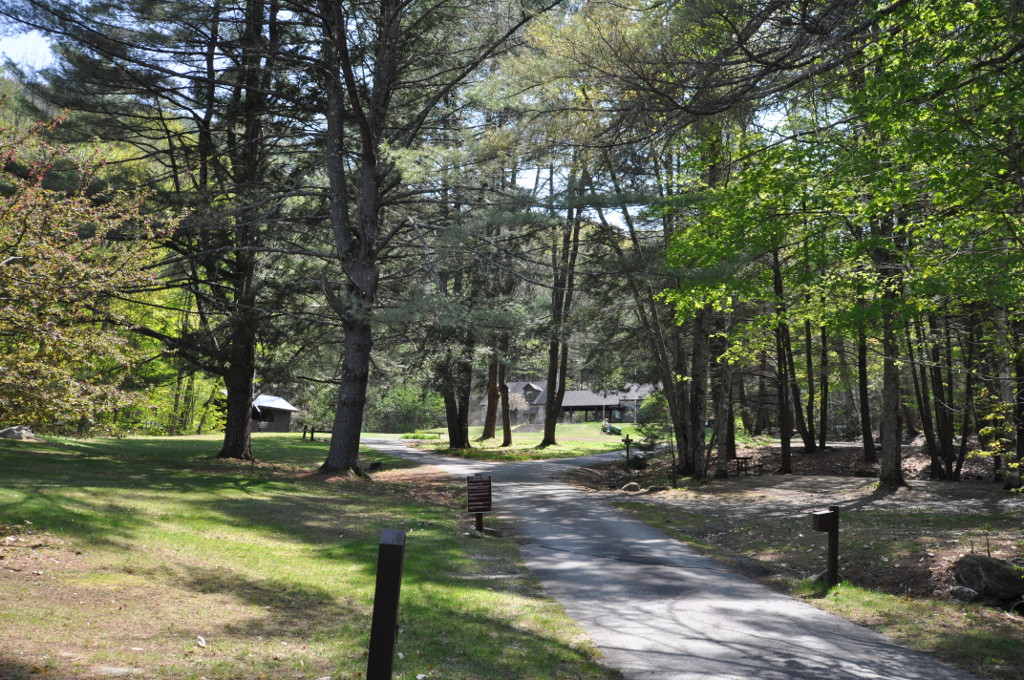
- Interactive map of Townshend State Park
- Type: State park
- Location: 2755 State Forest Rd. Townshend, Vermont
- Coordinates: 43.0409°N 72.6924°W
- Area: 41 acres (17 ha)
- Created: 1912
- Operator: Vermont Department of Forests, Parks, and Recreation
- Open: Memorial Day weekend - Labor Day weekend
- Website: https://vtstateparks.com/townshend.html
- Townshend State Park
- U.S. National Register of Historic Places
- U.S. Historic district
- Built by: Civilian Conservation Corps
- MPS: Historic Park Landscapes in National and State Parks MPS
- NRHP reference No.: 02000030
- Added to NRHP: February 14, 2002

Townshend State Park is a state park in Townshend, Vermont. Embedded within Townshend State Forest, the park provides a camping facility and hiking trails for accessing Bald Mountain. The park's facilities were developed by the Civilian Conservation Corps in the 1930s, and are listed on the National Register of Historic Places for their well-preserved state.

== Description ==
Townshend State Park is located in central Windham County, embedded within Townshend State Forest in southern Townshend. The park entrance is located on State Forest Road east of the Scott Covered Bridge, on the south side of the West River. The park is 41 acres (17 ha) in size and is set on the north slope of Bald Mountain, whose peak is at an elevation of 1,680 feet (510 m). The principal feature of the park is its campground, which provides 30 sites in a combination of tent sites, leantos, and minimally improved bare campsites. The campground has three spurs emanating from a central area, where the ranger contact station is located. The station is a pair of stone buildings connected by a gable-roofed open shelter. The building on the left houses the park office and ranger quarters, while that on the right are restrooms. Other CCC-built elements of the park include eight tent platforms and a storage building originally used as a comfort facility, as well as fireplaces, a water fountain, and a concrete water tank.

Land for the park and the surrounding state forest was purchased by the state in 1912. Originally 700 acres (280 ha), the forest is now over 1,000 acres (400 ha) in size. A fire tower (since removed) was built on Bald Mountain in 1924, and a picnic area was built by the state later in the 1920s. Most of the facilities seen in the park today were built by the CCC between 1933 and 1938, with only modest alterations, replacements of some features, and the loss of a few of the original tent platforms.

Activities at the park include picnicking, hiking, camping, and fishing.

== See also ==
- List of Vermont state parks
- National Register of Historic Places listings in Windham County, Vermont
