= Mathewson State Forest =

State forest in Caledonia County, Vermont

- Interactive map of Mathewson State Forest
- Type: State forest
- Location: Caledonia County, Vermont
- Coordinates: 44.612°N 72.068°W
- Area: 788 acres (3.19 km^{2})
- Operator: Vermont Department of Forests, Parks, and Recreation
- Website: Website

Mathewson State Forest covers 788 acres (3.19 km^{2}) in Sheffield, Sutton and Wheelock, Vermont in Caledonia County. The forest is managed by the Vermont Department of Forests, Parks, and Recreation for timber resources and wildlife habitat.

Activities in the park include hunting, snowmobiling, primitive camping, hiking, horseback riding and mountain biking.
