= Downer State Forest =

State Forest in Windsor County, Vermont

- Interactive map of Downer State Forest
- Type: State forest
- Location: Sharon, Windsor County, Vermont
- Coordinates: 43.7872°N 72.3879°W
- Area: 705 acres (2.85 km^{2})
- Created: 1910
- Operator: Vermont Department of Forests, Parks, and Recreation
- Status: Open For Public use
- Website: Website

Downer State Forest, also known as Charles Downer State Forest, covers 705 acres (2.85 km^{2}) in Sharon, Vermont in Windsor County. The forest is managed by the Vermont Department of Forests, Parks, and Recreation. The forest was established in 1910 by a gift from Charles Downer to establish a forestry demonstration area.

Activities in the forest include hiking, mountain biking, cross-country skiing, snowshoeing, snowmobiling, horseback riding, hunting and wildlife viewing. It is also managed for timber resources.

The Vermont Association of Snow Travelers grooms the forest road as a snowmobile trail in the winter.

== History ==
The forest was established in 1910 by a gift from Charles Downer to create a forestry demonstration area. The forest features conifer plantations he planted. The state forest highway, Camp Downer, and fishing pond were built by the Civilian Conservation Corps.
