= Granville Notch =

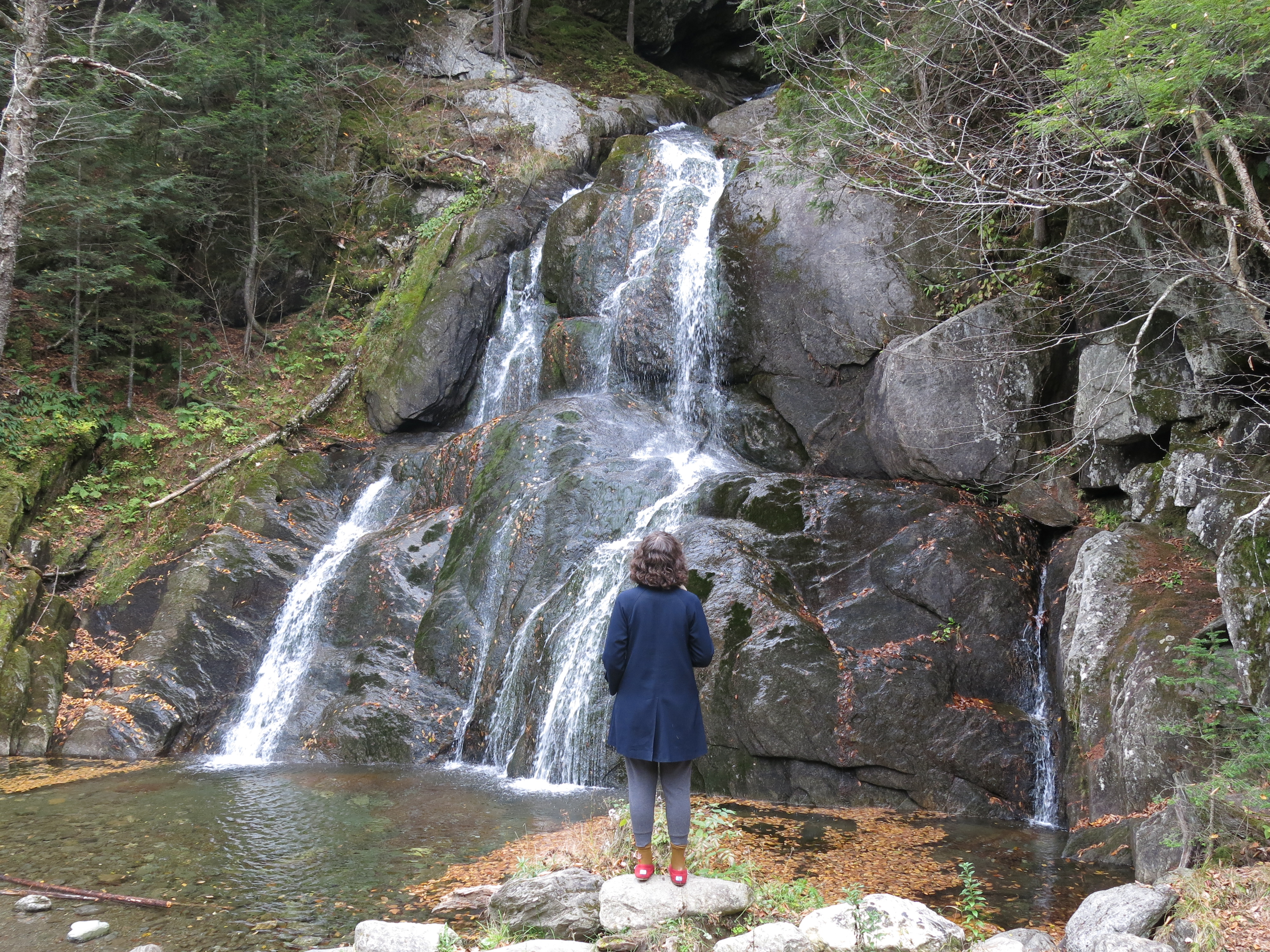
- Moss Glen Falls
- Interactive map of Granville Notch
- Elevation: 430 metres (1,410 ft)
- Traversed by: Vermont Route 100

Third Approach
- Location: Addison County, Vermont, United States
- Range: Green Mountains
- Coordinates: 44°1.94′N 72°49.91′W
- Topo map: USGS Warren

Granville Notch, or Granville Gulf, is a notch, or mountain pass, located in Granville, Vermont.

North of the height of land, the notch is the source of the Mad River, which drains into the Winooski River, and into Lake Champlain. Lake Champlain drains into the Richelieu River in Quebec, thence into the Saint Lawrence River, and into the Gulf of Saint Lawrence. To the south, the notch is drained by Alder Meadow Brook, a tributary of the White River, which drains into the Connecticut River, and into Long Island Sound in Connecticut.

The land within the notch is in Granville Gulf Reservation (1,171 acres), which extends about 7 mi (11 km) along the streams, from the border of Addison County with Washington County south to about a mile north of the town of Granville. It includes the Moss Glen Falls, where Deer Hollow Brook enters Alden Meadow Brook.
