= Proctor Piper State Forest =

- Interactive map of Proctor Piper State Forest
- Type: State forest
- Location: Cavendish, Windsor County, Vermont
- Coordinates: 43.3626°N 72.6316°W
- Area: 1,513 acres (6.12 km^{2})
- Operator: Vermont Department of Forests, Parks, and Recreation
- Website: Website

Proctor Piper State Forest covers 1,513 acres (6.12 km^{2}) in Cavendish, Vermont in Windsor County. The forest is managed by the Vermont Department of Forests, Parks, and Recreation.

The primary activities within the forest include seasonal hunting and snowmobiling, but can also include fishing and hiking.
