= Hapgood State Forest =

State Forest in Bennington County, Vermont

- Interactive map of Hapgood State Forest
- Type: State forest
- Location: Peru, Bennington County, Vermont
- Coordinates: 44.2042°N 72.61955°W
- Area: 118 acres (0.48 km^{2})
- Operator: Vermont Department of Forests, Parks, and Recreation
- Website: Website

Hapgood State Forest covers 118 acres (0.48 km^{2}) in Peru, Vermont in Bennington County. The forest is managed by the Vermont Department of Forests, Parks, and Recreation and surrounds the summit of 3,260-foot Bromley Mountain.

Much of this State Forest is leased to Bromley, Inc. to be operated as a ski area.
