= Shrewsbury Peak =

Mountain in Vermont, United States

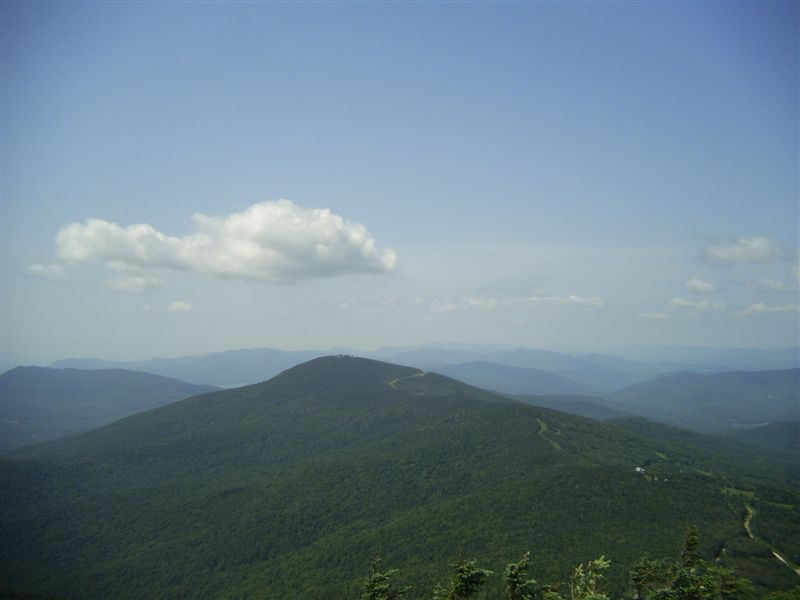
- Pico Peak seen from Killington Peak

Highest point
- Elevation: 1,130 metres (3,710 ft)
- Prominence: 190 m (620 ft)
- Coordinates: 43°34.54′N 72°48.36′W

Geography
- Location: Rutland County, Vermont, U.S.
- Parent range: Coolidge Range
- Topo map: USGS Killington Peak

Shrewsbury Peak is a mountain located in Rutland County, Vermont, in the Calvin Coolidge State Forest. The mountain is part of the Coolidge Range. Shrewsbury is flanked to the northwest by Little Killington.

The northeast slopes of Shrewsbury Peak drain into Madden Brook, thence into the Ottauquechee River, the Connecticut River, and into Long Island Sound in Connecticut. The southeast slopes of Shrewsbury Peak drain into Woodward Reservoir, thence into the Ottauquechee River. The south end of Shrewsbury Peak drains into Tinker Brook, thence into the headwaters of the Black River, another tributary of Connecticut River. The southwest slopes of Shrewsbury Peak drain into Gould Brook, thence into the Cold River, and Otter Creek, which drains into Lake Champlain, and thence into the Richelieu River in Québec, the Saint Lawrence River, and into the Gulf of Saint Lawrence. The west side of Shrewsbury Peak drains into Sargent Brook, thence into Gould Brook and the Cold River.

The Appalachian Trail, a 2,170-mile (3,500-km) National Scenic Trail from Georgia to Maine, and Vermont's Long Trail run through the Coolidge Range, about 1.5 miles (2 km) northwest of Shrewsbury Peak.

== See also ==
- List of mountains in Vermont
