= Jones State Forest =

State Forest in Washington County, Vermont, US

- Interactive map of Jones State Forest
- Type: State forest
- Location: Plainfield, Washington County, Vermont
- Coordinates: 44.230°N 72.371°W
- Area: 642 acres (2.60 km^{2})
- Created: 1909
- Operator: Vermont Department of Forests, Parks, and Recreation
- Website: Website

Jones State Forest, officially known as L.R. Jones State Forest, covers 642 acres (2.60 km^{2}) in Plainfield, Washington County in Vermont. The forest is managed by the Vermont Department of Forests, Parks, and Recreation.

Activities in the forest include hiking. The Spruce Mountain trail hikes up Spruce Mountain, a 3,037 foot peak, with a historic fire tower at the top.
