= Mount Putnam (Vermont) =

Mountain in Vermont, United States

Highest point
- Elevation: 3,642 ft (1,110 m)
- Prominence: 2,470 ft (750 m)
- Listing: #18 New England Fifty Finest
- Coordinates: 44°25.10′N 72°38.30′W

Geography
- Location: Worcester / Stowe, Vermont, U.S.
- Parent range: Worcester Range
- Topo map: USGS Stowe

Mount Putnam is a mountain located on the border between Washington County and Lamoille County, Vermont, in the Putnam State Forest. Mount Putnam, the high point of the Worcester Range, is flanked to the northeast by Mount Worcester, and to the southwest by Mount Hunger. It is the sixth most prominent peak in Vermont. The summit is in Washington County, but the mountain extends into Lamoille County as well.

Mount Putnam stands within the watershed of the Winooski River, which drains into Lake Champlain, and ultimately into the Gulf of Saint Lawrence in Canada. The north side of Mount Putnam drains into Gold Brook, thence into the Little River and the Winooski River. The west side of Mt. Putnam drains into Thatcher Brook, and thence into the Winooski. The east side of Mt. Putnam drains into Minister Brook, thence into the North Branch of the Winooski River.

== See also ==
- List of mountains in Vermont
- New England Fifty Finest
