= William C. Putnam State Forest =

- Interactive map of William C. Putnam State Forest
- Type: State forest
- Location: Grafton, Windham County, Vermont
- Coordinates: 43.2047°N 72.6224°W
- Area: 146 acres (0.59 km^{2})
- Operator: Vermont Department of Forests, Parks, and Recreation
- Website: Website

William C. Putnam State Forest covers 146 acres (0.59 km^{2}) in Grafton in Windham County, Vermont. The forest is managed by the Vermont Department of Forests, Parks, and Recreation.

Activities in the forest include hiking, snowshoeing and hunting.
