= Aitken State Forest =

State Forest in Rutland County, Vermont

- Interactive map of Aitken State Forest
- Type: State forest
- Location: Mendon, Rutland County, Vermont
- Coordinates: 43.5834°N 72.9285°W
- Area: 918 acres (3.72 km^{2})
- Created: 1912
- Operator: Vermont Department of Forests, Parks, and Recreation
- Website: Website

Aitken State Forest covers 918 acres (3.72 km^{2}) in Mendon, Vermont in Rutland County. The forest is managed by the Vermont Department of Forests, Parks, and Recreation for timber resources, wildlife habitat, and recreational activities.

Activities in the forest include hiking, hunting, primitive camping, cross-country skiing and snowmobiling. The Bald Mountain Trail (4.2 miles round trip) is noted for its four vista locations with panoramic views of the Green Mountains, Otter Creek and Cold River valleys, and Rutland. The forest is also known as a birding site.

The Vermont Association of Snow Travelers (VAST) maintains a ½ mile snowmobiling trail in the forest.

== Natural features ==
Bald Mountain (2087’) is located at the center of the park, and provides views in all directions.

== History ==
The Civilian Conservation Corps (CCC) had a camp on this state forest in the 1930s, and helped with forest management work including thinning 192 acres of Norway spruce trees and white pines that were planted between 1913 and 1924 following forest fires in the early 1900s.
