= West Rutland State Forest =

Managed forest in the United States

- Interactive map of West Rutland State Forest
- Type: State forest
- Location: West Rutland, Rutland County, Vermont
- Coordinates: 43.6583°N 73.0963°W
- Area: 344 acres (1.39 km^{2})
- Created: 1913
- Operator: Vermont Department of Forests, Parks, and Recreation
- Website: Website

West Rutland State Forest covers 344 acres (1.39 km^{2}) in West Rutland, Vermont in Rutland County. The forest is managed by the Vermont Department of Forests, Parks, and Recreation.

Activities in the forest include hunting, primitive camping and walking.
