= Arlington State Forest =

State Forest in Bennington County, Vermont

- Interactive map of Arlington State Forest
- Type: State forest
- Location: Arlington, Bennington County, Vermont
- Coordinates: 43.031089°N 73.20275°W
- Area: 225 acres (0.91 km^{2})
- Created: 1913
- Operator: Vermont Department of Forests, Parks, and Recreation
- Website: Website

Arlington State Forest covers 225 acres (0.91 km^{2}) in Arlington, Vermont in Bennington County. The forest is managed by the Vermont Department of Forests, Parks, and Recreation for timber resources and wildlife habitat.
