= Roxbury State Forest =

State Forest in Vermont

- Interactive map of Roxbury State Forest
- Type: State forest
- Location: Roxbury, Washington County, Vermont
- Coordinates: 44.0752°N 72.7809°W
- Area: 5,509 acres (22.29 km^{2})
- Operator: Vermont Department of Forests, Parks, and Recreation
- Website: Website

Roxbury State Forest covers 5,509 acres (22.29 km^{2}) in 3 blocks in Roxbury, Vermont in Washington County. The forest is managed by the Vermont Department of Forests, Parks, and Recreation for timber management, dispersed recreation, and wildlife habitat protection.

Activities in the forest include remote camping, backcountry hiking, skiing and snowshoeing. In 2025, 52 acres (21 ha) were added through a bargain sale and funding from the Warren Conservation Reserve Fund.
