= Jack Lazor =

American organic farmer (died 2020)

Jack Lazor (died November 28, 2020) was an American organic farmer. He was co-owner of Butterworks Farm in Westfield, Vermont, since 1976. The farm is credited with being the first certified organic dairy farm in the United States.

== Early life and education ==
Ledger grew up in Somers, Connecticut. His father was a polymer chemist at Monsanto. He first became interested in farming while working at Sturbridge Village during the summer in his college years.

Lazor graduated from Tufts University with self-designed degree in the history of agriculture.

== Butterworks Farm ==
Lazor started Butterworks Farm in Westfield, Vermont with his wife Anne.

Initially, the farm sold raw milk products. Jack delivered them door to door. Their lack of license led to inquiries by regulators, but the state of Vermont helped get certification for them, with their milk handlers license given in 1984.

When their products were first sold in retail stores in 1984, they were one of the few organic brands during the rise in yogurt consumption. They quickly established themselves as a respected brand and shipped to markets across the United States.

The rise of large corporate organic brands has led to a decline in the farm's profits.

In 2016, the farm transitioned into a grain free, 100% grass fed operation.

== Northern Grain Growers Association ==
Lazor co-founded the Northern Grain Growers Association.

He wrote the 2013 book, The Organic Grain Grower: Small-Scale, Holistic Grain Production for the Home and Market Producer.

== Personal life ==
With his wife Anne he had one daughter, Christine.
