= Victory State Forest =

Forest in Vermont, United States

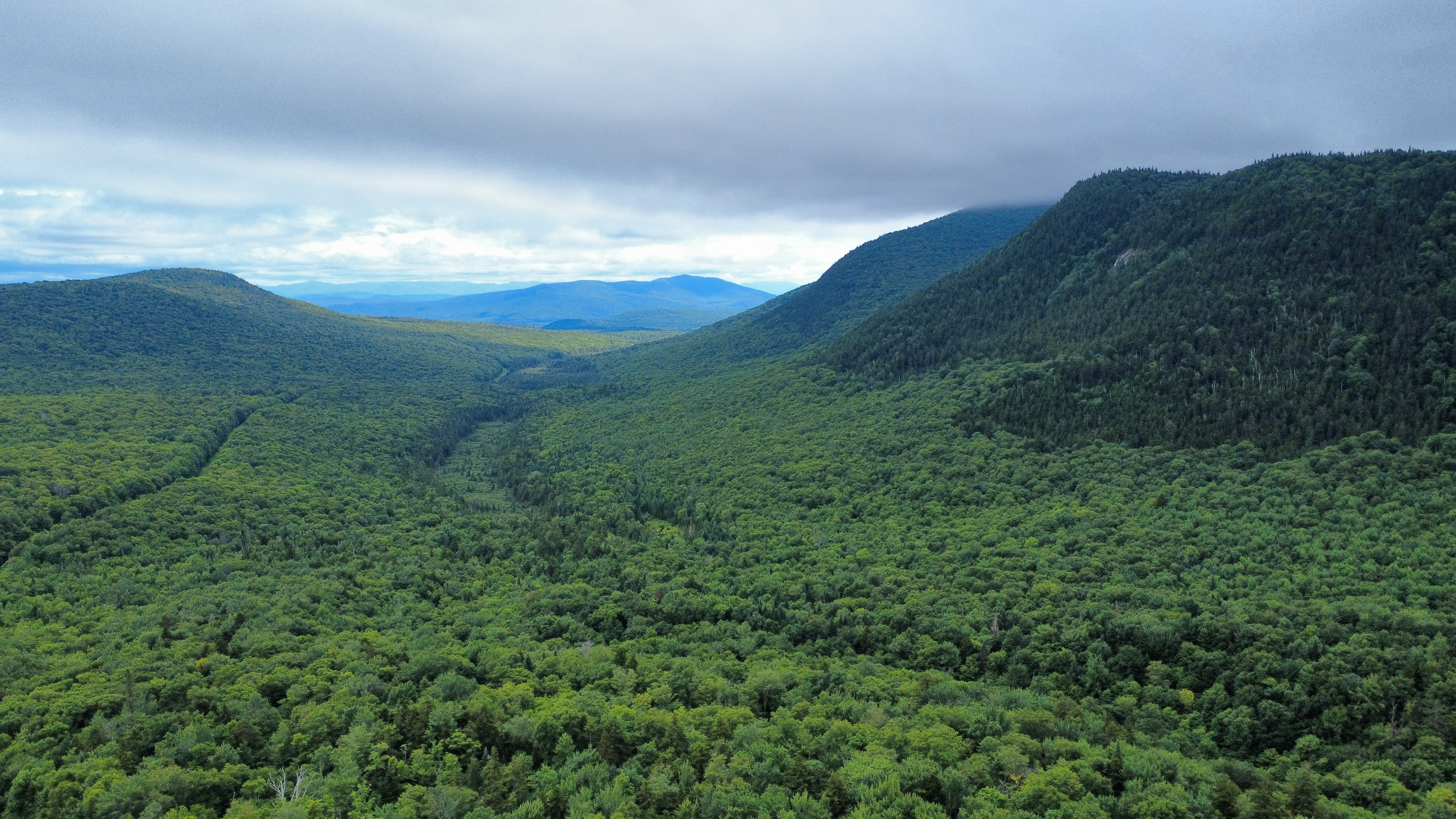
- View looking south towards Victory State Forest between East Burke and Gallup Mills
- Interactive map of Victory State Forest
- Type: State forest
- Location: Essex County, Vermont
- Coordinates: 44.5481°N 71.8278°W
- Area: 16,272 acres (65.85 km^{2})
- Operator: Vermont Department of Forests, Parks, and Recreation
- Website: Website

Victory State Forest covers 16,272 acres (65.85 km^{2}) in Concord, Granby, Lunenburg, and Victory, Vermont in Essex County. The forest is managed by the Vermont Department of Forests, Parks, and Recreation mainly for timber resources and wildlife habitat.

Activities in the forest include hunting, trapping, wildlife viewing, snowmobiling, hiking, snowshoeing, and horseback riding. Portions of the forest are open for primitive camping.
