= Rupert State Forest =

Forest in Vermont, United States

- Interactive map of Rupert State Forest
- Type: State forest
- Location: Rupert, Bennington County, Vermont
- Coordinates: 43.232°N 73.148°W
- Area: 363 acres (1.47 km^{2})
- Created: 1959
- Operator: Vermont Department of Forests, Parks, and Recreation
- Website: Website

Rupert State Forest covers 363 acres (1.47 km^{2}) in Rupert, Vermont in Bennington County. The forest is managed by the Vermont Department of Forests, Parks, and Recreation. It consists of two parcels located on the Rupert-Dorset town line that were a gift to the state in 1959, along with another 27 acres from the state in 2013.

There is no legal right-of-way to these lands.
