= Eshqua Bog Natural Area =

Coordinates: 43.593114°N 72.481835°W

The Eshqua Bog Natural Area is a protected area in Hartland, Vermont. It is 41 acres containing a wet bog. It is near Woodstock, about 11 miles west of White River Junction. There is a boardwalk allowing access to the wetland and views of rare plants. The flora of the area includes many post-glacial cold-climate plants native to bog and fen habitat, including Labrador tea, cotton grass, pitcher plants, showy lady's slippers, larches, and buckbean.
