= Joel Porte =

American literacy scholar

Joel Miles Porte (November 13, 1933 – June 1, 2006) was an American literary scholar, who was an internationally renowned authority on the life and work of Ralph Waldo Emerson.

== Biography ==
Porte was born in Brooklyn, New York, to "impecunious and unpedigreed" second-generation Russian Jewish immigrants and was raised there with his two brothers. Intellectually curious from an early age, he mastered Morse code and obtained, at the age of fourteen, a licence to operate the radio station W2YIR. Attending the selective public Brooklyn Technical High School, Porte excelled not only in English but also in the science of industrial processes, mechanical drawing, and printing technology. Porte enrolled at Cooper Union (1951–52) after graduating from high school and intended to pursue an engineering career, but left owing to lack of interest and of perceived ability. A paragraph from Mark Van Doren's A Liberal Education (1943) compelled him to switch to literary studies, first at night school at Brooklyn College (1952–53) and subsequently at the City College of New York. In 1957, he received his A.B. magna cum laude in English and Classics from City College, and won two Claflin medals for excellence in Greek and the Ward Prize in English Composition, besides being elected to Phi Beta Kappa.

Admitted to Harvard for graduate studies, Porte studied with Perry Miller, earning his Ph.D. in 1962 and receiving the Bowdoin Prize for an essay on Emerson. Seven years later, at the age of 36, Porte would become one of the youngest persons to reach the rank of full professor in the history of the Harvard English department. Awarded a Rockefeller Scholarship to Bellagio, Italy (1979), and a Guggenheim Fellowship (1981–82), Porte's career took him throughout the world as a visiting scholar and lecturer, and also led him to scholarly consultancies with publishers, universities, professional associations, and media groups, and to the editorial boards of leading academic journals. Even though he now moved in the privileged milieu of Ivy League academia, he still remembered the ethnic and economic marginality he experienced in his youth, which disposed him to extend his generosity to others who "lacked 'natural' entitlement."

In 1987, he resigned as Ernest Bernbaum Professor of Literature and Chair of the Harvard English Department to become the Frederick J. Whiton Professor of American Literature at Cornell. Two years later, Porte was appointed Cornell's Director of American Studies and Ernest I. White Professor of American Studies and Humane Letters. Porte retired from the university in 2004 with the title Emeritus. In recognition of his lifetime contribution to Emerson scholarship, the national Emerson Society granted him the Distinguished Achievement Award in 2006. Porte died in Ithaca, New York, in June, the same year, from esophageal cancer. He was survived by his second wife Helene Sophrin Porte and his only child, Susanna Maria Porte, from his first marriage to Ilana d'Ancona, which had ended in divorce.

== Contributions to literary scholarship ==
Porte was prolific and original in his contributions to the study of nineteenth-century American literature. He published 12 books, the most highly admired of which were Representative Man (Oxford, 1979; rev. ed., Columbia, 1988), a study of Emerson; In Respect to Egotism: Studies in American Romantic Writing (Cambridge, 1991), and Consciousness and Culture: Emerson and Thoreau Reviewed (Yale, 2004).

Porte's approach to Emerson was distinctive, and it remains fresh despite the passage of time. Porte brought a luminous intelligence to the often-overlooked specifics of Emerson's language, tracing vibrant images and motifs through his essays and demonstrating the imaginative power not of Emerson's sometimes hazy concepts, but of what Emerson called a "living, leaping Logos." Part of the problem, Porte noted, was the reverential emphasis usually placed on Emerson's character, which could obscure actual attention to his work. In his influential 1973 essay "The Problem of Emerson" Porte noted that despite the triumph of New Critical methods, Emerson's work "has manifestly not been accorded that careful scrutiny of his work as writing which Poe, Hawthorne, Melville, Thoreau, Dickinson, Whitman, [and other writers of the American Renaissance]...have received in superabundance." Porte set out to remedy the oversight. Finely attuned to the intricate ebb and flow of Emerson's writing, Porte's criticism revealed Emerson as a writer of stunning depth, power, and complexity. In Representative Man (1979) Porte brought this approach to its culmination, placing Emerson's imagination in fresh cultural and psychological contexts; the book was widely recognized as an enduring achievement.

Works edited by Porte included Emerson in His Journals (Belknap, 1982), which presented for the first time in generations a well-edited selection from that sprawling masterwork; the Library of America Emerson (1983); the Cambridge New Essays volume (1990) on Henry James' The Portrait of a Lady; the Cambridge Companion to Ralph Waldo Emerson (1999); and Emerson's Prose and Poetry: a Norton Critical Edition (2001). The last two of these were co-edited with Saundra Morris, a former student of his from Cornell who now teaches at Bucknell. Porte's critical editions of Emerson's works have been staples of college reading lists in the United States, but his influence spread much farther afield. In 2002, the French Ministry of Education decided to prescribe the Norton for the Agrégation exam required of prospective college teachers.
