= Okemo State Forest =

State Forest in Andover, Ludlow, Mount Holly, and Weston counties, Vermont

- Interactive map of Okemo State Forest
- Type: State forest
- Location: Windsor and Rutland Counties, Vermont
- Coordinates: 43.3797°N 72.7519°W
- Area: 7,466 acres (30.21 km^{2})
- Operator: Vermont Department of Forests, Parks, and Recreation
- Website: Website

Okemo State Forest covers 7,466 acres (30.21 km^{2}) in Andover, Ludlow, Mount Holly and Weston, Vermont, United States, in Windsor and Rutland Counties. Okemo Mountain Resort is located in the forest. The forest is managed by the Vermont Department of Forests, Parks, and Recreation.

Activities in the forest include hiking, biking, cross country skiing, snowmobiling and hunting. Portions of the forest are open to primitive camping. Access is both by state and town road as well as state forest highways (4WD gravel roads).

Okemo State Forest is home to the 798-acre Terrible Mountain Natural Area.
