= Putnam State Forest =

State forest in Lamoille and Washington counties, Vermont

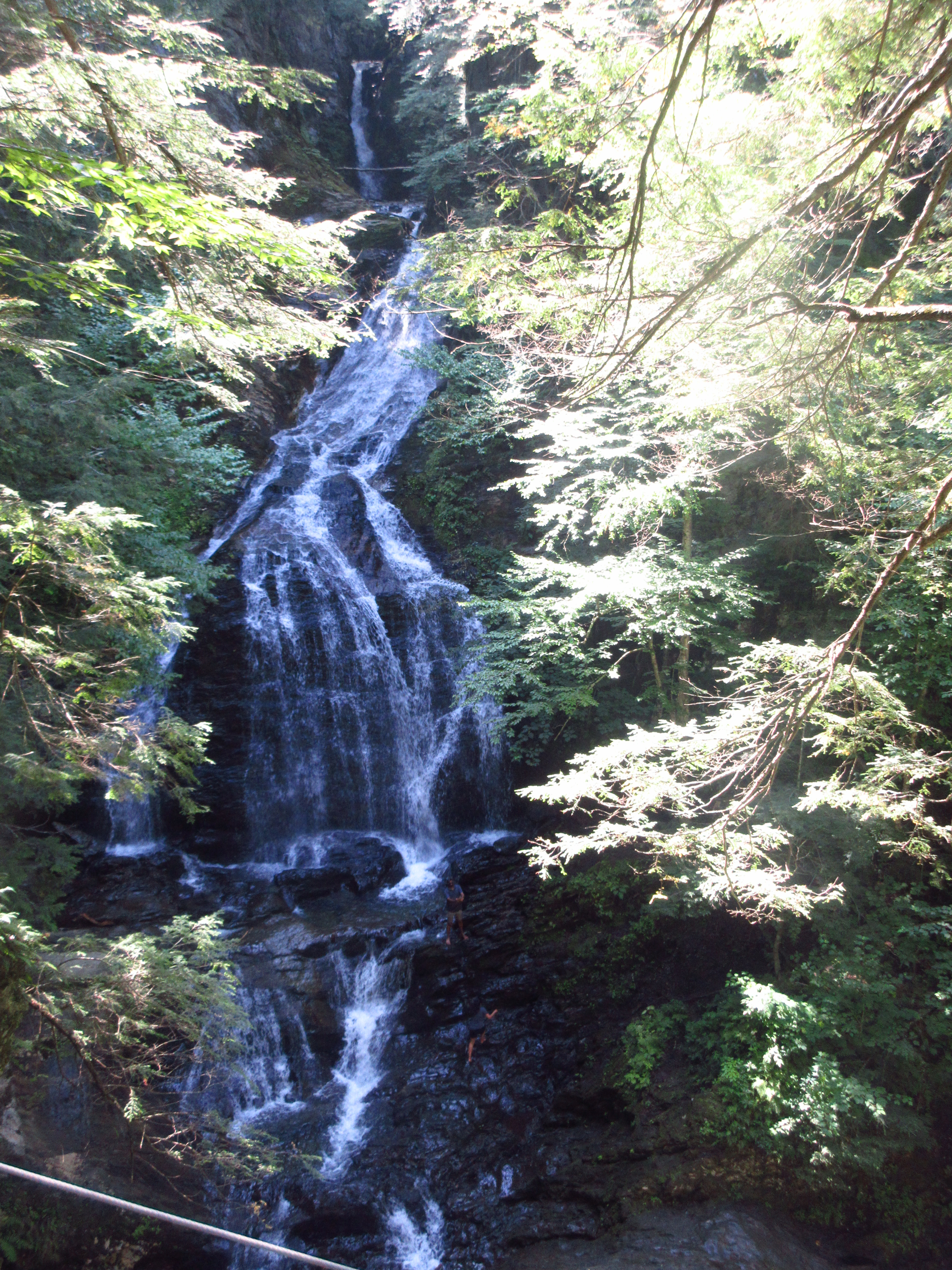
- Moss Glen Falls lies within the boundaries of the forest.
- Interactive map of Putnam State Forest
- Type: State forest
- Location: Lamoille and Washington County, Vermont
- Coordinates: 44.4234°N 72.6228°W
- Area: 13,633 acres (55.17 km^{2})
- Operator: Vermont Department of Forests, Parks, and Recreation
- Website: Website

Putnam State Forest, officially known as C.C. Putnam State Forest, covers 13,633 acres (55.17 km^{2}) in Lamoille and Washington County in Vermont. The forest is managed by the Vermont Department of Forests, Parks, and Recreation in parts of Stowe, Elmore, Waterbury, Worcester and Middlesex.

Activities in the forest include hiking, cross-country skiing, snowshoeing, and wildlife viewing.

The forest is located in the Worcester Range, part of the Green Mountains, and includes Mount Hunger, Mount Putnam and Mount Worcester. All the land above 2,500 feet elevation is designated as Worcester Range Natural Area, an area of 4,032 acres.

An 80-acre section in Stowe is designated as the Moss Glen Falls Natural Area (Stowe) and features one of the highest waterfalls in the state, with a total drop of over 100 feet.
