= Big Falls of the Missisquoi Natural Area =

State Natural Area in Orleans County, Vermont

Coordinates: 44°58′21″N 72°23′10″W

Big Falls of the Missisquoi Natural Area is an Orleans County, Vermont recreation area for swimming, fishing, and sight-seeing. The area also has many old-growth hemlock plants and pine trees. Currently an undeveloped site near the small rural town of Troy, the falls is composed of 16 acres (6.5 ha) on both sides of the Missisquoi River, 2,400 feet (730 m) of which is frontage. Classified as a Vermont Natural Area protected site, the area is managed by the Vermont Department of Forests, Parks and Recreation.

Originating from its headwaters in Lowell, the falls have an estimated 100-foot (30 m) drop. The somewhat isolated acreage has always been a popular picnic and recreation spot for local residents. In the 1950s, the water rights were held by an out-of-state entity, when purchased by the Vermont Citizens Utilities Company, following an assessment by the United States Army Corps of Engineers that the falls held potential as a substantive source of output from an on-site hydroelectric plant. The area was subsequently deeded back to the state in 1996 after the utilities company abandoned its plans.
