= Granville Gulf Reservation =

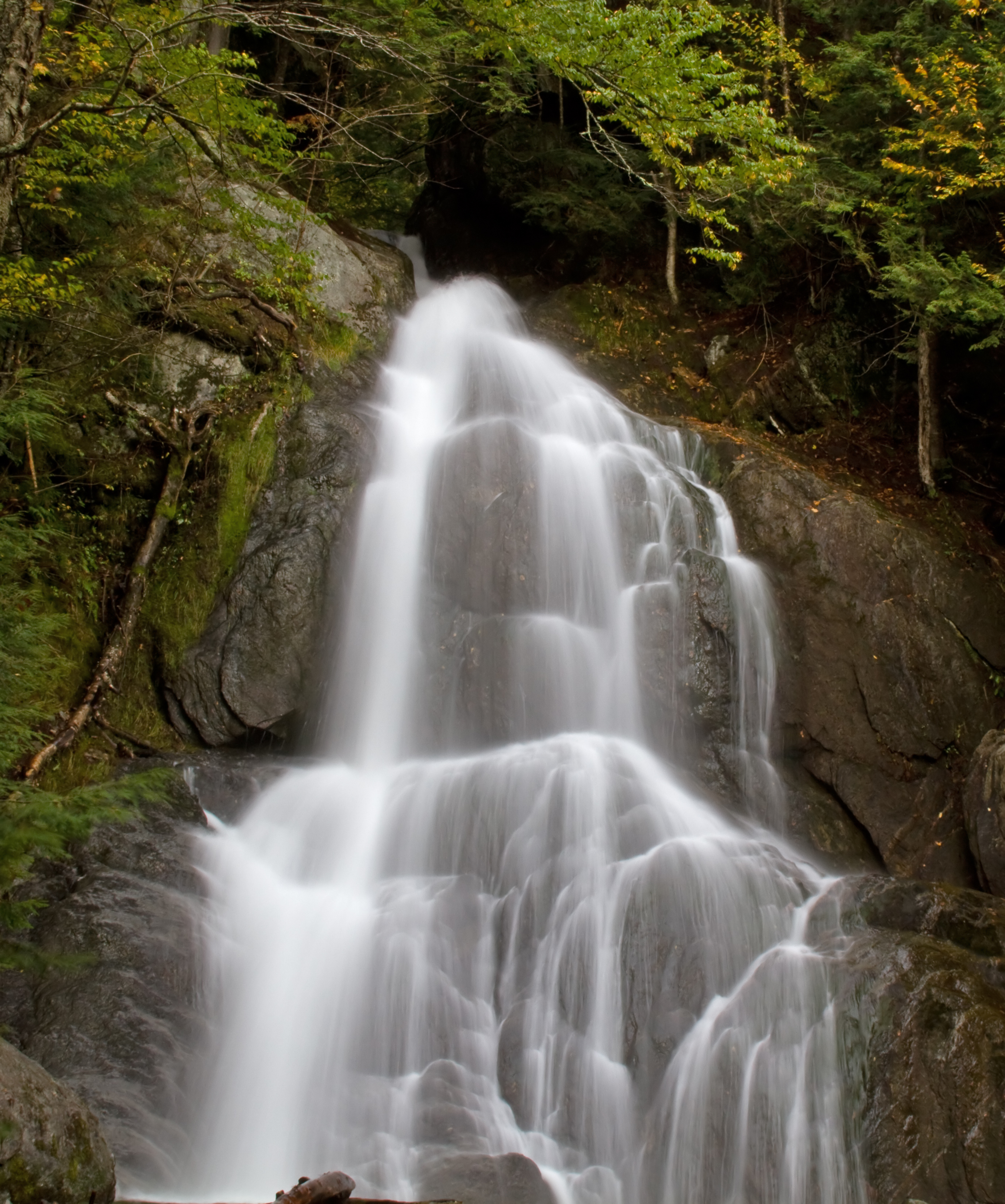
- Moss Glen Falls in Granville Gulf Reservation
- Interactive map of Granville Gulf Reservation
- Type: State protected area
- Location: Granville, Addison County, Vermont
- Coordinates: 43.1998°N 72.5529°W
- Area: 1,171 acres (4.74 km^{2})
- Created: 1928
- Operator: Vermont Department of Forests, Parks, and Recreation
- Website: Website

Granville Gulf Reservation protects 1,171 acres (4.74 km^{2}) on either side of a six-mile section of Vermont Route 100 in Granville, Vermont. The area is managed by the Vermont Department of Forests, Parks, and Recreation and traverses the Granville Notch.

The land extends about 7 mi (11 km) along the streams, from the border of Addison County with Washington County south to about a mile north of the town of Granville. It includes the 80-foot Moss Glen Falls, which is visited by a short walk off Route 100. The Moss Glen Falls Natural Area is a 5-acre state-designated Natural Area.

A 20-acre old-growth stand of red spruce and hemlock has been designated as the Granville Gulf Spruce-Hemlock Stand, a State Natural Area.

== History ==
In 1928, former governor Redfield Proctor Jr. donated the first 900 acres of the site to the state. Additional purchases were made in 1942 and 1952.
