= Francis W. Hatch =

American poet

Francis Whiting Hatch (January 9, 1897 – May 14, 1975) was an American businessman, writer, poet, playwright, composer, performer, and philanthropist.

== Early life ==
Hatch was born on January 9, 1897, in Medford, Massachusetts, to George Stanley Hatch and Mary Kidder Whiting. During World War I he served as a lieutenant in the 48th Infantry Regiment. He graduated from Harvard University in 1919 and was a member of the Delphic Club. On June 27, 1922, he married Marjorie Katherine Kennard in Cazenovia, New York. The ceremony was performed by Charles Brent, Bishop of the Episcopal Church's Diocese of Western New York. The Hatches resided in Wayland, Massachusetts, and had a summer home in Castine, Maine. They had one child, Francis W. Hatch Jr.

== Business ==
In 1921, Hatch went to work for the firm of Barton, Durstine & Osborne (later Batten, Barton, Durstine & Osborne). He eventually became the firm's vice president and manager of its Boston office. He retired from the firm in 1956. In 1960, the Advertising Club of Boston created the Francis W. Hatch Awards for creative excellence in advertising.

Outside of advertising, Hatch was a director of the Putnam Fund, Metro-Goldwyn-Mayer, and Shreve, Crump & Low.

== Philanthropy ==
Hatch served as the New England Chairman and was a member of the national board of directors for the Boy Scouts of America. He also served as chairman of the Committee on Boys' Life. In 1945, he received the Silver Buffalo Award, the organization's highest honor.

During World War II, Hatch was active in the United States Red Cross, Community Fund, and War Bond campaigns. He also was a member of the Naval Manpower Survey Board of the First Naval District, the Naval Officer Recruitment Board, and the Massachusetts Committee on Public Safety. Hatch led the Greater Boston Red Cross Fund campaign for 1946. In 1947 he was elected to the Massachusetts General Hospital board of trustees. In 1953 he was named publicity chairman of the Mental Health Fund of Massachusetts. He served as chairman of the 1956 Red Feather drive. For 30 years, Hatch was the president and treasurer of Castine Hospital.

Hatch also served as a trustee of the Noble and Greenough School, Mount Auburn Cemetery, Boston Symphony Orchestra and the New England Conservatory of Music, member of the corporation of the Robert Breck Brigham Hospital, chairman of the Harvard Fund, president of the Harvard Alumni Association, and president-general of the Society of the Cincinnati.

== Writing ==
In 1955, Hatch was described in The Boston Daily Globe as a "writer of short, mostly humorous, verses and occasional prose articles". His writings appeared in The Atlantic, The New Yorker, Down East, Yankee, American Neptune, The Saturday Evening Post, The Boston Globe, The Christian Science Monitor, The Pilot, the Boston Herald, The Ellsworth American, and other publications. He had a weekly column, "Where But New England", published by Essex County Newspapers. Hatch was also known for writing music and lyrics for amateur music shows. His first published song was "Some of the Time I'm Lonely", which he wrote for the Hasty Pudding Club Show of 1919. He was known for the songs "Some Coward Closed the Old Howard," a humorous paean to Boston's famous vaudeville house The Old Howard, and "Vote Early and Often for Curley," a parody reelection campaign song for Boston Mayor James Michael Curley. He also launched a mock campaign against Manhattan clam chowder, which included the song "Why Doesn't a Clam Get Claustrophobia", which he performed on LP record. Another Hatch record, "Urban Redevelopment and Other Swan Songs of Old Boston" included songs such as "Scollay Square, Where Are You Today?", "Henry Thoreau Fell in Love with a Pond", and "God Save the Bricks on Beacon Hill". In Castine, Hatch had an outdoor theater on a bank above a beach, where he wrote, produced, directed, and occasionally performed in plays based on the town's legends and history.

== Death ==
In 1967, Hatch moved to Castine, Maine. He died on May 14, 1975, at Massachusetts General Hospital in Boston.
