= Vermont Land Trust =

American non-profit environmental organization

- Vermont Land Trust Inc.
- Formation: 1977; 48 years ago
- Type: Nonprofit
- Tax ID no.: 03-0264836
- Legal status: 501(c)(3)
- Headquarters: Montpelier, Vermont
- Board of directors: Bill Keeton; Abbie Corse; Carolyn Gilbert; Charlie Hancock; Cheryl Morse; Hannah Sessions; Jean Hamilton; Jess Phelps; John Kassel; John Laggis; Katherine Sims; Maria Young; Meriwether Hardie; Mike Donohue; Pieter Bohen; Ramsey Luhr
- Website: https://vlt.org/

The Vermont Land Trust is a non-profit environmental organization in the U.S. state of Vermont, working to conserve productive, recreational, and scenic lands which give the state and its communities their rural character.

== History ==
The Vermont Land Trust was founded in 1977 by a group of citizens concerned about the rapidly accelerating development that threatened open space in Vermont. The founding group feared that state legislation Act 250 and local zoning was not strong enough to protect the rural character of the state.

== Operation ==
The trust provides the money to purchase undeveloped land when necessary. It then protects the land with a special easement which prevents development. It then sells the land to interested purchasers, which may be the state government. In selling the land, the trust principal is continually renewed.

The organization works with The Nature Conservancy.

== Officers ==
- President - Gilbert Livingston. Salary - $101,079
- Vice-President - Barbara Wagner. Salary - $92,484
- Vice-President - Elise Annes. Salary - $76,820
