= Mendon, Vermont =

- Town
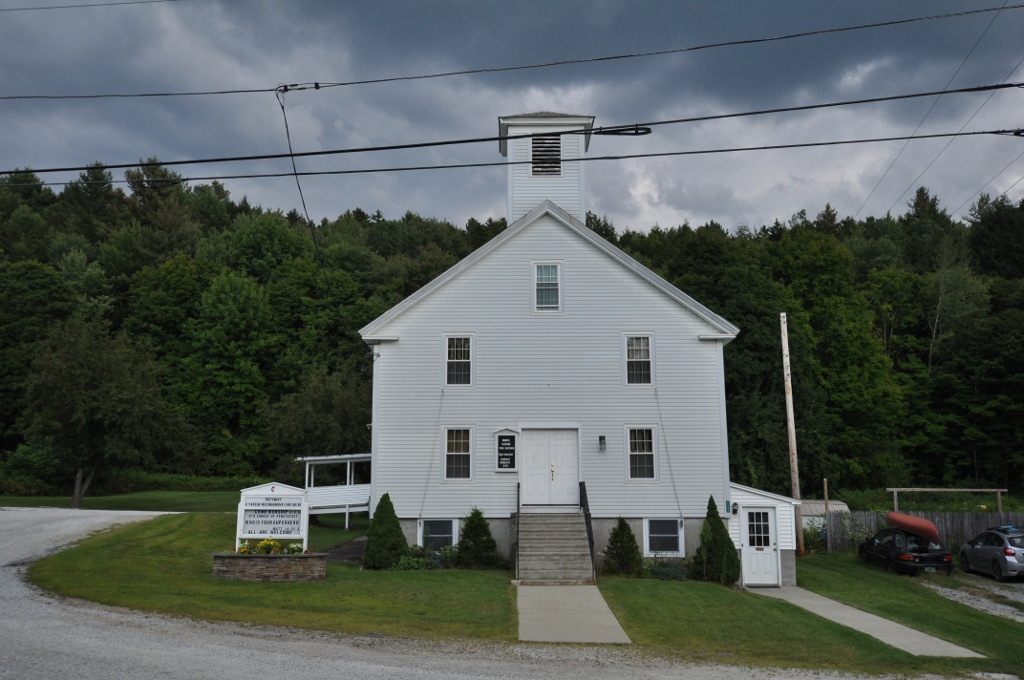
- United Methodist Church

- Logo

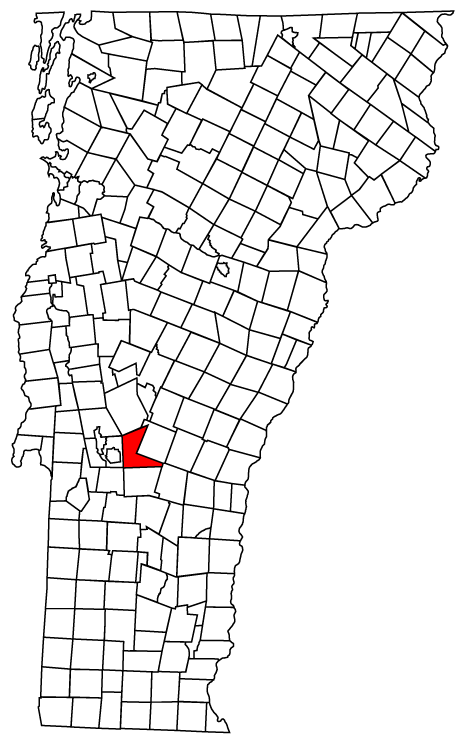
- Mendon, Vermont
- Coordinates: 43°37′30″N 72°52′44″W
- Country: United States
- State: Vermont
- County: Rutland

Area
  - Total: 38.1 sq mi (98.7 km^{2})
  - Land: 38.1 sq mi (98.6 km^{2})
  - Water: 0 sq mi (0.0 km^{2})
- Elevation: 1,847 ft (563 m)

Population (2020)
  - Total: 1,149
  - Density: 30.2/sq mi (11.7/km^{2})
- Time zone: UTC-5 (Eastern (EST))
  - Summer (DST): UTC-4 (EDT)
- ZIP code: 05701
- Area code: 802
- FIPS code: 50-44125
- GNIS feature ID: 1462145
- Website: mendonvt.gov

Mendon is a town in Rutland County, Vermont, United States. The population was 1,149 at the 2020 census.

== History ==
In February 1781, the town chartered under the name "Medway." The town name changed "Parkerstown" after it annexed a tract of land in November 1804. Finally, the town was renamed to "Mendon" in November 1828.

Mendon was one of thirteen Vermont towns isolated by flooding caused by Hurricane Irene in 2011.

== Geography ==
According to the United States Census Bureau, the town has a total area of 38.1 square miles (99 km^{2}), of which 0.03% is water.

Aitken State Forest is located in Mendon. The state land covers 918 acres (3.72 km^{2}) and includes a hiking trail up Bald Mountain (2,090 ft), hunting, primitive camping, cross-country skiing and snowmobiling. The Appalachian Trail/Long Trail crosses the southeast corner of the town, passing near the summit of Killington Peak.

== Demographics ==
Historical population
Census	Pop.	Note	%±
1790	34		—
1800	39		14.7%
1810	111		184.6%
1820	174		56.8%
1830	432		148.3%
1840	545		26.2%
1850	504		−7.5%
1860	633		25.6%
1870	612		−3.3%
1880	629		2.8%
1890	570		−9.4%
1900	392		−31.2%
1910	321		−18.1%
1920	264		−17.8%
1930	251		−4.9%
1940	313		24.7%
1950	334		6.7%
1960	461		38.0%
1970	743		61.2%
1980	1,056		42.1%
1990	1,049		−0.7%
2000	1,028		−2.0%
2010	1,059		3.0%
2020	1,149		8.5%
U.S. Decennial Census

As of the census of 2000, there were 1,028 people, 410 households, and 296 families residing in the town. The population density was 27.0 people per square mile (10.4 people/km^{2}). There were 616 housing units at an average density of 16.2 units per square mile (6.3 units/km^{2}). The racial makeup of the town was 98.25% White, 0.78% Asian, and 0.97% from two or more races. Hispanic or Latino of any race were 0.19% of the population.

There were 410 households, out of which 31.2% had children under the age of 18 living with them, 62.2% were married couples living together, 7.3% had a female householder with no husband present, and 27.6% were non-families. 19.0% of all households were made up of individuals, and 6.1% had someone living alone who was 65 years of age or older. The average household size was 2.49 and the average family size was 2.83.

In the town, the population was spread out, with 23.2% under the age of 18, 5.5% from 18 to 24, 28.7% from 25 to 44, 28.8% from 45 to 64, and 13.7% who were 65 years of age or older. The median age was 42 years. For every 100 females, there were 106.8 males. For every 100 females age 18 and over, there were 111.0 males.

The median income for a household in the town was $53,125, and the median income for a family was $61,250. Males had a median income of $39,375 versus $30,592 for females. The per capita income for the town was $26,206. About 2.3% of families and 4.7% of the population were below the poverty line, including 5.6% of those under age 18 and none of those age 65 or over.

== Notable people ==
- Edward H. Ripley, Brevet Brigadier General in the Union Army during the American Civil War
- John E. Woodward, U.S. Army brigadier general during World War I

== See also ==
- List of municipalities in Vermont
