= Vermont Association of Snow Travelers =

American snowmobiling organization

The Vermont Association of Snow Travelers, Inc. (VAST) was founded in 1967 and is responsible for the organization of the sport of snowmobiling, maintaining and grooming over 5,000 miles of trails in the state of Vermont. Based in Berlin, Vermont, VAST is a private, non-profit organization with six full-time employees and one seasonal employee. Across the state, VAST includes more than 120 clubs, with over 24,000 members combined. Over 80% of the trails are on private land, and the clubs obtain landowner permission for trails on private property.

According to state law, all snowmobile riders in the state must belong to VAST and a local club in order to ride on trails or else face a fine. Use of VAST trails is permitted only in the winter, starting December 16th; other use is considered trespassing.

The organization is also responsible for renovation and management of the 93-mile Lamoille Valley Rail Trail, which is open for recreational use year-round.

Federal tax forms for 2017 show that VAST had revenues of $3.6 million (of which $2.1 million was membership dues) and expenses of $3.7 million. Over $3 million of that spending was on programs, with $625,811 dedicated to administration and $4,418 spent on fundraising.
