= Westfield, Vermont =

- Town
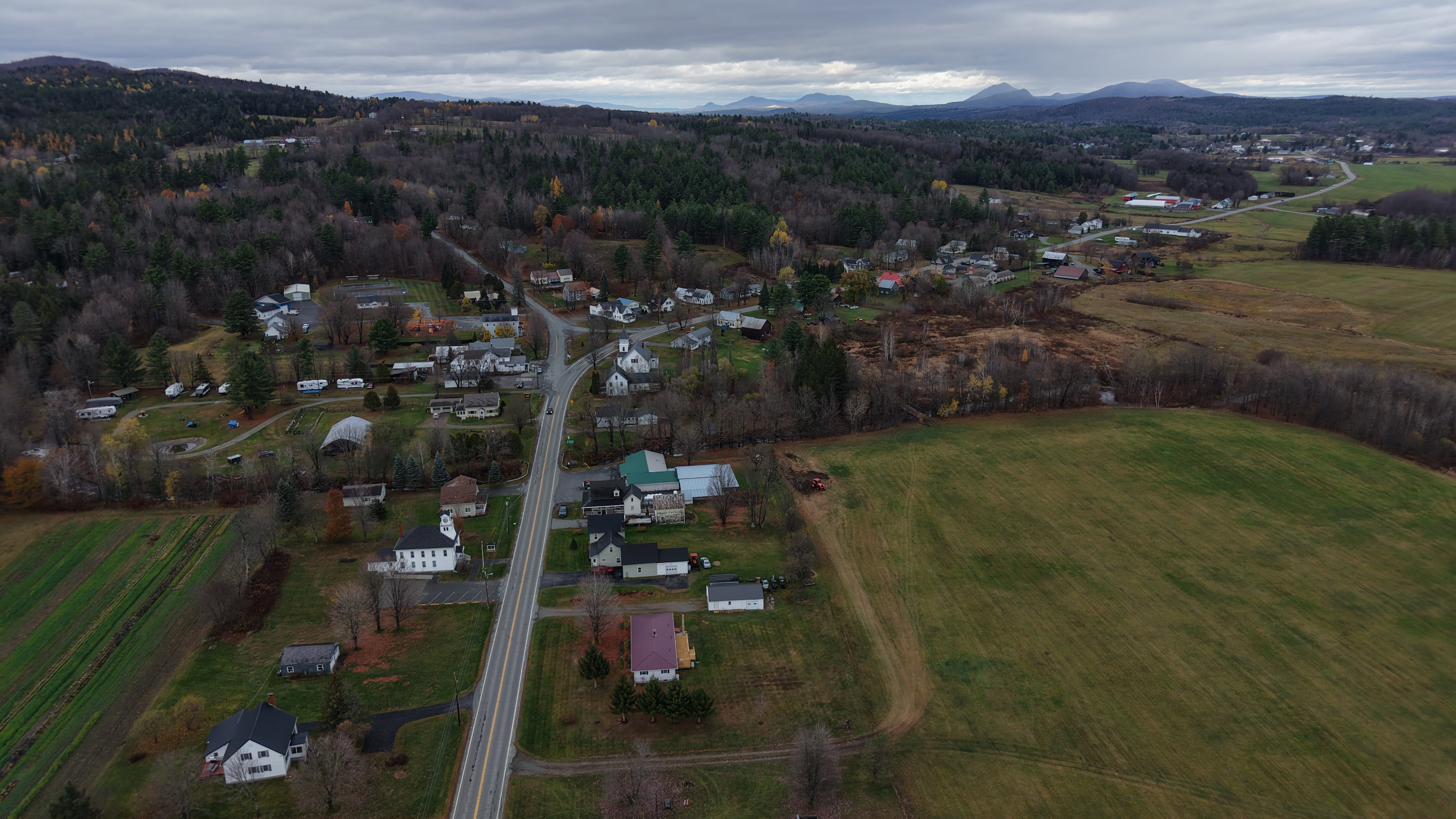
- Westfield from the south

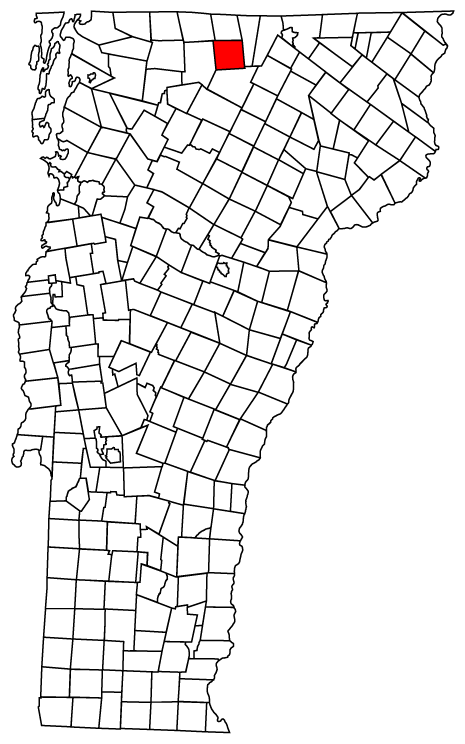
- Location in Orleans County, Vermont
- Coordinates: 44°52′50″N 72°29′40″W
- Country: United States
- State: Vermont
- County: Orleans
- Chartered: May 15, 1780

Area
  - Total: 40.2 sq mi (104.1 km^{2})
  - Land: 40.2 sq mi (104.0 km^{2})
  - Water: 0 sq mi (0.0 km^{2})
- Elevation: 1,824 ft (556 m)

Population (2020)
  - Total: 534
  - Density: 13/sq mi (5.1/km^{2})
- Time zone: UTC-5 (EST)
  - Summer (DST): UTC-4 (EDT)
- ZIP code: 05874
- Area code: 802
- FIPS code: 50-80200
- GNIS feature ID: 1462250
- Website: westfield.vt.gov

Westfield is a town in Orleans County, Vermont United States. The population was 534 at the 2020 census. The town was founded in 1780 and named after Rhode Island general and politician, William West, a supporter of Vermont statehood.

Westfield is home to the Immaculate Heart of Mary Abbey, a contemplative order of women, following the Benedictine rule.

== History ==
The Abbey Sainte-Marie de Deux-Montagnes, near Montreal, Canada, founded the Monastery of the Immaculate Heart of Mary in Westfield, Vermont, in 1981.

== Geography ==
According to the United States Census Bureau, the town has a total area of 40.2 square miles (104.1 km^{2}), all land.

Hazens Notch is located in town.

=== Climate ===
Climate data for Westfield, Vermont
| Month | Jan | Feb | Mar | Apr | May | Jun | Jul | Aug | Sep | Oct | Nov | Dec | Year |
|---|---|---|---|---|---|---|---|---|---|---|---|---|---|
| Record high °F (°C) | 64 (18) | 62 (17) | 83 (28) | 87 (31) | 92 (33) | 95 (35) | 98 (37) | 95 (35) | 96 (36) | 84 (29) | 74 (23) | 66 (19) | 98 (37) |
| Mean daily maximum °F (°C) | 26 (−3) | 31 (−1) | 41 (5) | 54 (12) | 69 (21) | 77 (25) | 81 (27) | 79 (26) | 70 (21) | 57 (14) | 43 (6) | 31 (−1) | 55 (13) |
| Mean daily minimum °F (°C) | 6 (−14) | 8 (−13) | 19 (−7) | 31 (−1) | 43 (6) | 52 (11) | 57 (14) | 55 (13) | 47 (8) | 37 (3) | 27 (−3) | 13 (−11) | 33 (1) |
| Record low °F (°C) | −38 (−39) | −38 (−39) | −32 (−36) | −2 (−19) | 20 (−7) | 28 (−2) | 36 (2) | 32 (0) | 23 (−5) | 0 (−18) | −7 (−22) | −40 (−40) | −40 (−40) |
| Average precipitation inches (mm) | 2.96 (75) | 2.16 (55) | 2.96 (75) | 2.93 (74) | 3.67 (93) | 3.93 (100) | 4.19 (106) | 4.18 (106) | 3.76 (96) | 3.45 (88) | 3.47 (88) | 3.12 (79) | 40.78 (1,036) |

== Demographics ==
Historical population
| Census | Pop. | Note | %± |
|---|---|---|---|
| 1800 | 16 | | — |
| 1810 | 149 | | 831.3% |
| 1820 | 225 | | 51.0% |
| 1830 | 353 | | 56.9% |
| 1840 | 370 | | 4.8% |
| 1850 | 502 | | 35.7% |
| 1860 | 618 | | 23.1% |
| 1870 | 721 | | 16.7% |
| 1880 | 698 | | −3.2% |
| 1890 | 763 | | 9.3% |
| 1900 | 646 | | −15.3% |
| 1910 | 613 | | −5.1% |
| 1920 | 490 | | −20.1% |
| 1930 | 448 | | −8.6% |
| 1940 | 354 | | −21.0% |
| 1950 | 358 | | 1.1% |
| 1960 | 347 | | −3.1% |
| 1970 | 375 | | 8.1% |
| 1980 | 418 | | 11.5% |
| 1990 | 422 | | 1.0% |
| 2000 | 503 | | 19.2% |
| 2010 | 536 | | 6.6% |
| 2020 | 534 | | −0.4% |
U.S. Decennial Census

As of the census of 2000, there were 503 people, 200 households, and 141 families residing in the town. The population density was 12.5 people per square mile (4.8/km^{2}). There were 339 housing units at an average density of 8.4 per square mile (3.3/km^{2}). The racial makeup of the town was 96.02% White, 0.40% African American, 0.20% Native American, 0.20% Asian, 0.60% from other races, and 2.58% from two or more races. Hispanic or Latino of any race were 1.59% of the population.

There were 200 households, out of which 26.5% had children under the age of 18 living with them, 55.0% were married couples living together, 9.0% had a female householder with no husband present, and 29.5% were non-families. 21.0% of all households were made up of individuals, and 8.5% had someone living alone who was 65 years of age or older. The average household size was 2.45 and the average family size was 2.78.

In the town, the population was spread out, with 21.3% under the age of 18, 7.8% from 18 to 24, 22.9% from 25 to 44, 31.6% from 45 to 64, and 16.5% who were 65 years of age or older. The median age was 44 years. For every 100 females, there were 101.2 males. For every 100 females age 18 and over, there were 96.0 males.

The median income for a household in the town was $38,021, and the median income for a family was $43,125. Males had a median income of $30,694 versus $21,042 for females. The per capita income for the town was $18,098. About 6.1% of families and 9.7% of the population were below the poverty line, including 9.0% of those under age 18 and none of those age 65 or over.

== Notable people ==
- Thomas J. Boynton, Massachusetts Attorney general
- Elisha W. Keyes, Wisconsin politician
- Jack Lazor, pioneering organic dairy farmer
- Carroll S. Page, governor of Vermont
- Harrison Stebbins, Wisconsin politician
