= Grand Isle =

Grand Isle may refer to:

== Places ==
In the United States:

- Grand Isle, a barrier island on the Gulf Coast, part of Jefferson Parish, Louisiana
  - Grand Isle, Louisiana, a town located on the island
  - Grand Isle State Park (Louisiana), a park on the island
- Grand Isle, Maine, a town in Maine
  - Grand Isle (CDP), Maine, the primary village in the town
- Grand Isle, Vermont, a town in Vermont
- Grand Isle (island), an island in Vermont
- Grand Isle County, Vermont
- Grand Isle State Park (Vermont)

== Other uses ==
- Grand Isle (1991 film), a film directed by Mary Lambert
- Grand Isle (2019 film), a film directed by Stephen Campanelli
- USCGC Grand Isle, a 110 ft Island Class cutter

== See also ==
- Grandisle, Edmonton, Alberta, Canada
- Grand Island (disambiguation)
- Grande Île (disambiguation)
- Rail Car Grand Isle, an exhibition building at Shelburne Museum in Shelburne, Vermont
