= Grand Isle State Park =

Grand Isle State Park may refer to a place in the United States:

- Grand Isle State Park (Louisiana)
- Grand Isle State Park (Vermont)
