= Grand Island =

Grand Island may refer to:

== Places ==
=== United States ===
- Grand Island, California, a community in Colusa County
- Grand Island (California), an island in the Sacramento-San Joaquin River Delta
- Grand Island, Florida, a community
- Grand Island, Nebraska, a city
  - Grand Island (Nebraska), a former island on the Wood and Platte Rivers; original site of the city
- Grand Island, New York, a town and island in the Niagara River
- Grand Island (Massachusetts), an island
- Grand Island Township, Michigan, on an island of the same name in Lake Superior
  - Grand Island National Recreation Area, located on the same island

=== Other countries ===
- Ilha Grande, in Brazil
- Grand Island (Balsam Lake) in Balsam Lake in Canada
- Grand Jason Island, sometimes known as "Grand Island", in the Falkland Islands
- Isla Grande, in Panama

== Other ==
- Grand Island (band), a Norwegian rock band
- USS Grand Island, a frigate of the United States Navy

== See also ==
- Grand Isle (disambiguation)
- Grande Île (disambiguation)
- Grand Island Senior High School (disambiguation)
