= Champlain-Adirondack Biosphere Reserve =

Biosphere reserve in New York and Vermont, US

Coordinates: 44.0000°N 73.2200°W

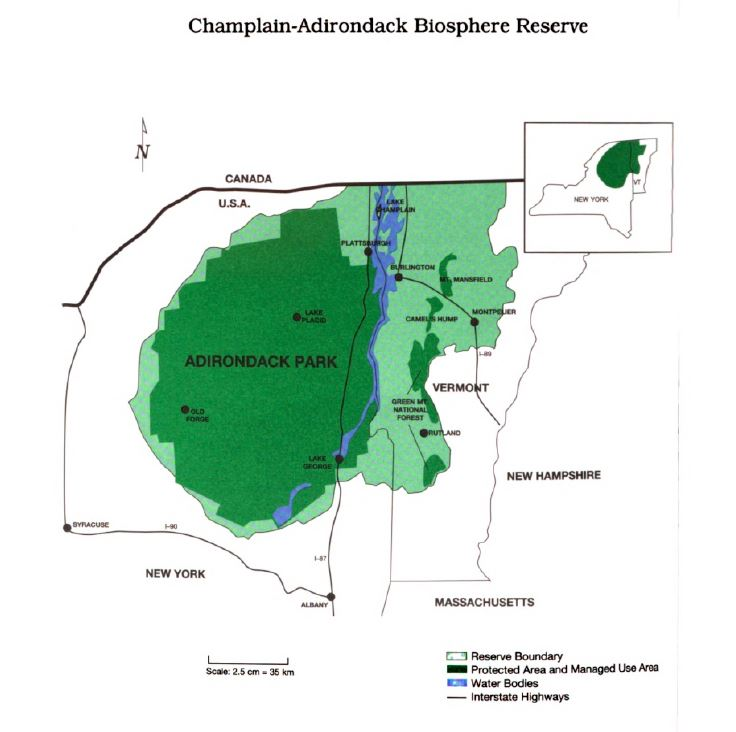
Map of the Champlain-Adirondack Biosphere Network

The Champlain-Adirondack Biosphere Network (formerly Champlain-Adirondack Biosphere Reserve) is a UNESCO-designated biosphere reserve. The Champlain-Adirondack Biosphere Network is part of a global network of 727 biosphere reserves in 131 countries and it is one of 28 internationally recognized biosphere regions in the United States.

== Summary ==
The Champlain-Adirondack Biosphere Network straddles the border of north-central New York and northwestern Vermont. Lake Champlain, the sixth largest lake in the United States, and the Adirondack and Green Mountains are the central features of the biosphere region. It includes extensive temperate coniferous and deciduous forests as well as large numbers of lakes, bogs, and freshwater wetlands. The primary goal of the Champlain-Adirondack Biosphere Network is to use education, research, and demonstration projects to encourage social and economic vitality and to preserve and improve the environmental health of the region.

This temperate broadleaf forest measures 3,990,000 hectares in total. Its core area measures 960,000 hectares, its buffer zones 1,130,000 hectares, and transition areas 1,900,000 hectares. Its altitude is +29 to +1,629.

It was designated as a biosphere reserve by UNESCO in 1989. The administrative authorities overseeing the Champlain-Adirondack Biosphere Network include Adirondack Park Agency, the U.S. Department of Agriculture, the Forest Service, and the Vermont Agency of Natural Resources. The Champlain-Adirondack Biosphere Network is managed by co-chairs Jim Brangan, Cultural Heritage and Recreation Coordinator for the Lake Champlain Basin Program (LCBP) and assistant director of the Champlain Valley National Heritage Partnership (CVNHP), Professor Kelly Cerialo from Paul Smith's College, and a steering committee composed of members from New York and Vermont.

== Research ==
Research in the Champlain-Adirondack Biosphere Network focuses on atmospheric pollutants, water quality, watershed management, geographic information systems, and forest research or silviculture. Specific abiotic variables include acid rain and hydrology.

== Socioeconomic characteristics ==
The biosphere region and its outlying areas are inhabited by over 400,000 people (1994) and are within a day's drive of 60 million people living in the U.S. and Canada. Of all the biosphere reserves in the United States, it has the highest population. Forestry and tourism are the economic base in the Adirondack region on the New York side of Lake Champlain. The more diverse economy on the Vermont side of the lake is based on forestry, farming, tourism, light manufacturing, and production of specialty agricultural products.

== Sources ==
This article incorporates text from a free content work (license statement/permission). Text taken from UNESCO - MAB Biosphere Reserves Directory, UNESCO, UNESCO.
