= Split Rock =

Split Rock may refer to:

== Places ==
=== United States ===
- Split Rock, New York, also industrial disaster site
- Split Rock, Wisconsin, an unincorporated community
- Split Rock Township, Minnesota

== Rock formations ==
- Split Rock (Bronx, New York), a boulder in Pelham Bay Park, New York City, United States
- Split Rock, or Tracy's Rock, on the Moon
- The Split Rock, a landmark in Easky, Ireland
- Split Rock, Antarctica
- Split Rock (Wyoming), along Sweetwater River

== Other uses ==
- Pleiospilos, a genus of South African succulent plants

== See also ==
- Split Rock Lighthouse, Minnesota, United States
- Split Rock Lighthouse State Park, Minnesota, United States
- Split Rock Creek State Park, Minnesota, United States
- Split Rock Wildway, New York, United States
- Split Rock Dam, Australia
- Splitrock Reservoir, New Jersey, United States
