= Cumberland Head, New York =

- Census-designated place
- Flag
- Nickname: Le Bijou du Nord
- Location in Clinton County and the state of New York.
- Coordinates: 44°42′59″N 73°24′9″W
- Country: United States
- State: New York
- County: Clinton
- Town: Plattsburgh

Area
  - Total: 3.86 sq mi (10.00 km^{2})
  - Land: 3.86 sq mi (10.00 km^{2})
  - Water: 0 sq mi (0.00 km^{2})
- Elevation: 144 ft (44 m)

Population (2020)
  - Total: 1,735
  - Density: 449.5/sq mi (173.56/km^{2})
- Time zone: UTC-5 (Eastern (EST))
  - Summer (DST): UTC-4 (EDT)
- ZIP Code: 12901 (Plattsburgh)
- FIPS code: 36-19408
- GNIS feature ID: 1867398

Cumberland Head is a census-designated place and region of the town of Plattsburgh in Clinton County, New York, United States. As of the 2020 census, Cumberland Head had a population of 1,735.

Cumberland Head is a peninsula projecting into Lake Champlain, and includes the communities of Rocky Point and Champlain Park.

A landing for the Lake Champlain Transportation Company's ferry to Gordon Landing on Grand Isle, Vermont, is near the southern end of Cumberland Head. Cumberland Bay State Park is located at the northern end of the peninsula.

There is a historic lighthouse on the end of Cumberland Head.

== Geography ==
Cumberland Head is located in the northeastern part of the town of Plattsburgh at 44°42′59″N 73°24′9″W (44.716345, -73.402603).

According to the United States Census Bureau, the CDP has a total area of 3.6 square miles (9.3 km^{2}), all land.

== Demographics ==
Historical population
| Census | Pop. | Note | %± |
|---|---|---|---|
| 2000 | 1,494 | | — |
| 2010 | 1,635 | | 9.4% |
| 2020 | 1,735 | | 6.1% |
U.S. Decennial Census

As of the census of 2000, there were 1,532 people, 629 households, and 439 families residing in the CDP. The population density was 413.9 inhabitants per square mile (159.8/km^{2}). There were 793 housing units at an average density of 214.3 per square mile (82.7/km^{2}). The racial makeup of the CDP was 96.08% White, 1.50% African American, 0.33% Native American, 0.33% Asian, 0.07% Pacific Islander, 0.59% from other races, and 1.11% from two or more races. Hispanic or Latino of any race were 0.91% of the population. Common ancestries included English (18.8%), French (17.6%), Irish (15.6%), French Canadian (12.6%), Polish (7.4%), and a few Italian-American families.

There were 629 households, out of which 29.9% had children under the age of 18 living with them, 58.8% were married couples living together, 7.2% had a female householder with no husband present, and 30.2% were non-families. 23.2% of all households were made up of individuals, and 8.1% had someone living alone who was 65 years of age or older. The average household size was 2.44 and the average family size was 2.89.

In the CDP, the population was spread out, with 24.0% under the age of 18, 4.7% from 18 to 24, 28.6% from 25 to 44, 28.9% from 45 to 64, and 13.9% who were 65 years of age or older. The median age was 41 years. For every 100 females, there were 99.5 males. For every 100 females age 18 and over, there were 99.1 males.

The median income for a household in the CDP was $54,659, and the median income for a family was $62,434. Males had a median income of $41,100 versus $27,438 for females. The per capita income for the CDP was $29,092. About 1.7% of families and 3.5% of the population were below the poverty line, including none of those under age 18 and 21.5% of those age 65 or over.

== Locations on Cumberland Head ==
- Champlain Park – A community on the western shore of Cumberland Point, south of Rocky Point.
- Colligan Point – A projection into Lake Champlain on the eastern side of Cumberland Point.
- Cumberland Bay – The bay formed between Cumberland Point and the mainland.
- Cumberland Bay State Park – A state park at the northern end of Cumberland Point.
- Martin Point – A projection into Lake Champlain, south of Colligan Point.
- Rocky Point – A hamlet on the western shore of Cumberland Point near Cumberland Bay.

== Education ==
The census-designated place is within the Beekmantown Central School District.

== See also ==
- Plattsburgh (town), New York
- Lake Champlain
- Monte Cristo sandwich
