= Lake Champlain Transportation Company =

Ferry company in the United States

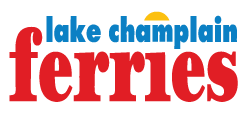

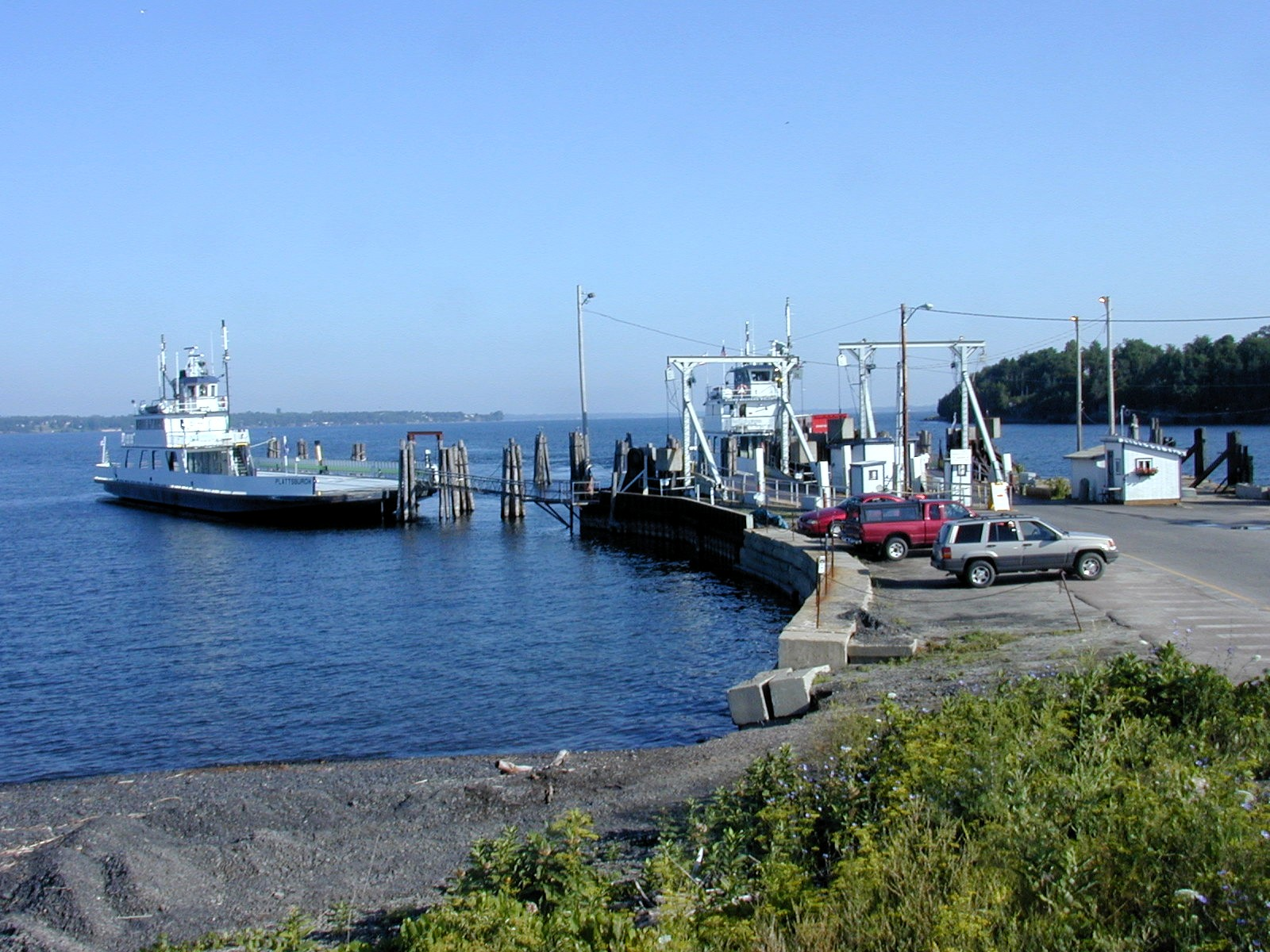
- The Plattsburgh and Cumberland at Grand Isle
- Company type: Private company
- Industry: Transportation
- Founded: 1826; 200 years ago; incorporated 1976; 50 years ago
- Headquarters: Burlington, Vermont, United States
- Key people: Raymond Pecor III, President
- Products: Ferry service, Sightseeing cruises
- Website: ferries.com

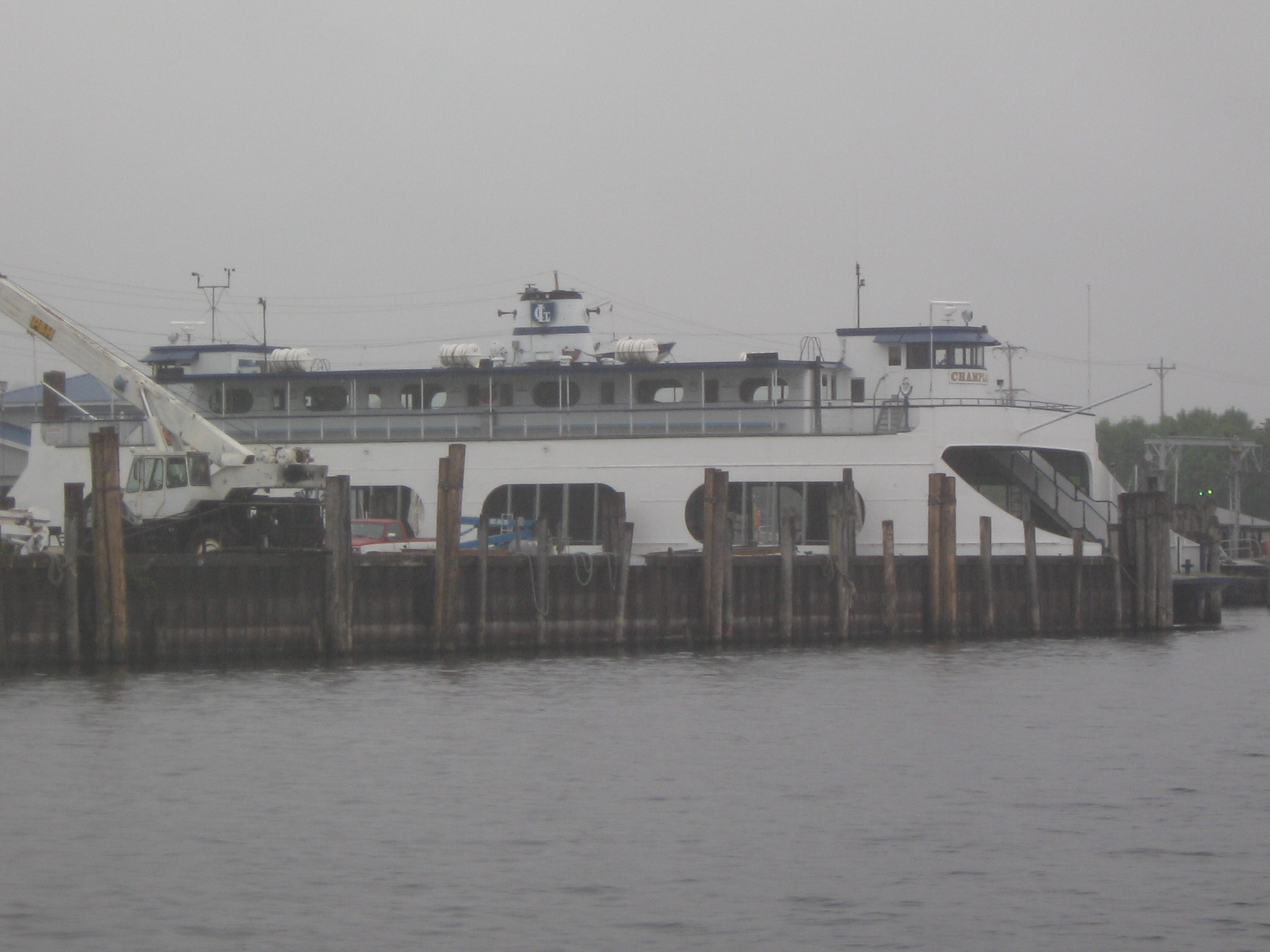
An LCTC ferry on the Burlington-Port Kent route

The Lake Champlain Transportation Company (LCTC or LCT) is a vehicle ferry operator that runs three routes across Lake Champlain between the U.S. states of New York and Vermont. From 1976 to 2003, the company was owned by Burlington, Vermont businessman Raymond C. Pecor Jr., who is chairman of its board. In 2003, he sold the company to his son, Raymond Pecor III.

Lake Champlain is the thirteenth-largest lake in the United States, reaching a maximum width of 12 miles (19 km) and depths of more than 300 feet (91 m). As such, there is no bridging of the "broad lake" north of Crown Point, New York, and south of the Rouses Point–Alburgh–Swanton crossing near the Canada–United States border, though bridging of the lake near Plattsburgh has been proposed. Approximately one million passengers cross the lake by ferry each year.

== Service area ==
Service was originally provided at three points, listed from south to north:

- Charlotte, Vermont to Essex, New York
- Burlington, Vermont to Port Kent, New York
- Grand Isle, Vermont to Plattsburgh, New York at Cumberland Head

All runs employ at least two double-ended diesel ferries, making the crossings in opposite directions. All ferries are capable of carrying large trucks as well as cars, bicycles, and foot passengers and are of a roll-on, roll-off design (although they can operate single-ended in the event of an engine failure). Under the terms of the Maritime Transportation Security Act, vehicles and luggage brought on board some LCT vessels may be subject to search. Most runs are considered quite scenic.

During the summer, the company also provides dinner cruises and charters from Burlington as well as special runs that allow the watching of the Independence Day fireworks display at the Burlington waterfront.

=== Charlotte–Essex ===
The Charlotte–Essex ferry is run year-round, but may not operate if there is heavy icing on the lake. This became a year-round route in 1998 and has operated year-round all but two winters since.

Until the 1920s when the Champlain Bridge was built, this was the primary route for cross-lake travel.

=== Burlington–Port Kent ===
The Burlington–Port Kent ferry crossed the maximum width of the lake and did not operate in the winter. This crossing took approximately one hour. The ferry last operated in 2019 and has not run since.

=== Grand Isle–Plattsburgh ===
The Grand Isle–Plattsburgh ferry is an ice-breaking route and provides 24-hour service year-round. The crossing on this route takes approximately 12 minutes. In 2001, the company spoke out against a proposed plan to build a bridge that would replace this route.

=== Crown Point–Chimney Point ===
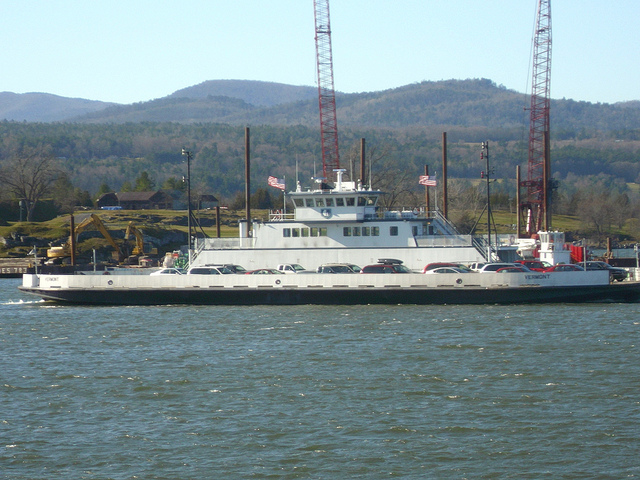
The Vermont running at Crown Point. Cranes for the construction of the new Lake Champlain Bridge in the background, November 2010.

In addition, LCTC operated a temporary ferry, free for users at a cost to the states of New York and Vermont of about $10 per car, from Crown Point, New York, to Chimney Point, Vermont from 2009–2011. This 20-minute crossing operated 24-hours per day following the removal of the Champlain Bridge due to structural problems and during the construction of a new span.

With the opening of the new Lake Champlain Bridge, this ferry crossing was no longer needed. Service ended on November 7, 2011.

== Fleet ==
=== Ferries currently in use ===
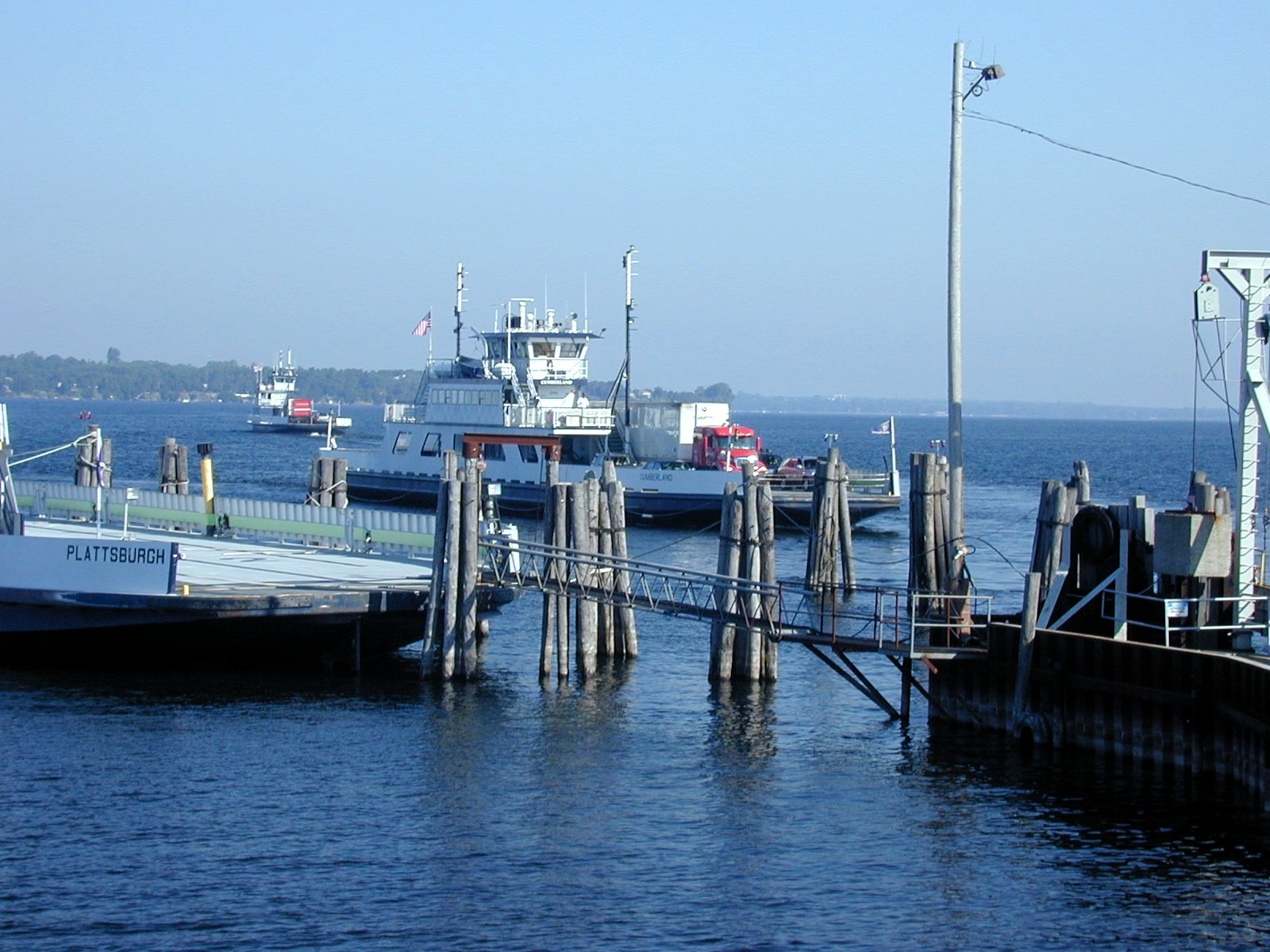
Plattsburgh, Cumberland, and (in the background) EWW

Ferries currently used by the Lake Champlain Transportation Company, including six vessels that can run in ice:

- The Evans Wadhams Wolcott (built 1988 to run in ice; the "EWW", pronounced "E, double-U, double-U" and named after Lewis P. Evans Jr., Richard H. Wadhams and James G. Wolcott, the founders of the modern company)
- The Governor George D. Aiken (built 1975; named after the former governor of Vermont and U.S. Senator)
- The Grand Isle (built 1953; was overhauled in the 1995 and extended by 40 feet (12.2 m); this vessel now runs in ice; named after the Vermont town but runs on the Charlotte-Essex crossing)
- The Northern Lights (built 2002 to resemble the steamer Ticonderoga; used for public scenic and charter cruises under the brand "Lake Champlain Cruises.")
- The Plattsburgh (built 1984 to run in the ice; named after Plattsburgh, New York)
- The Valcour (built 1947 from WWII surplus; named after Valcour Island, site of a military battle; this vessel was the last ferry to be built on Lake Champlain and was constructed at the historic Shelburne Shipyard)
- The Vermont (built 1992 to run in ice)
- The Cumberland (built 2000 to run in ice; named for Cumberland Head, the specific location of the Plattsburgh ferry slip)
- The Raymond C. Pecor Jr.,(built 2010) named for Raymond Pecor who ran the company from 1976 to 2004, father of Trey Pecor (aka Raymond Pecor III), the company's current president. (Raymond Pecor is also the owner of the Vermont Lake Monsters, a minor league baseball team headquartered in Burlington.)

American Recovery and Reinvestment Act of 2009 grants totaling approximately $600,000 were used under the National Clean Diesel Funding Assistance Program to reduce emissions by the ferries.

=== Decommissioned ferries ===
Some of the ferries that have been used by LCTC in the past:

- The Adirondack
  - The oldest, in-service, double-ended ferryboat of all time, built in 1913, named after the Adirondack Mountains.
  - Scrapped in 2022
- The Champlain
  - Built in 1930. Also doubled as a charter cruise boat for large groups under the brand "Lake Champlain Cruises".
  - Scrapped in 2022
- The Charlotte
- The Essex
- The Mount Marcy

== History ==
From about 1820 to 1850, approximately five horse ferry crossings operated on Lake Champlain.

The Burlington Bay Horse Ferry shipwreck discovered in 1983 in Lake Champlain is an example of a turntable team boat. "Horse-powered ferries like the one sunk in the Bay of Burlington, Vermont, had reached their heyday in the 1830s and 1840s. Eventually, in the 1850s, the steam boat took over and the days of horse-powered ferries quickly came to an end."

A brief history of the vessels owned by the Lake Champlain Transportation Co. from 1948–2010 is available online.

== Ice-breaking on Lake Champlain ==
During the winter, Lake Champlain sometimes ices over, making ferry service on the long Burlington-Port Kent route impractical. The Grand Isle-Plattsburgh route is short enough to maintain an open channel, and the distance to the Rouses Point Bridge makes it practical for substantial motor traffic to use the ferry, justifying the difficulty of keeping the ferry service operating. The ferries used on this run are of the ice-breaking type; their hulls and propellers are reinforced to allow the boats to operate through thin or broken ice. By operating continuously, the ferries maintain an open channel throughout the winter ice season.

In the past, the ferries did not operate around the clock, but in wintertime, a few runs were made through the night to prevent the ice from freezing solidly. Now, scheduled runs continue throughout the night.

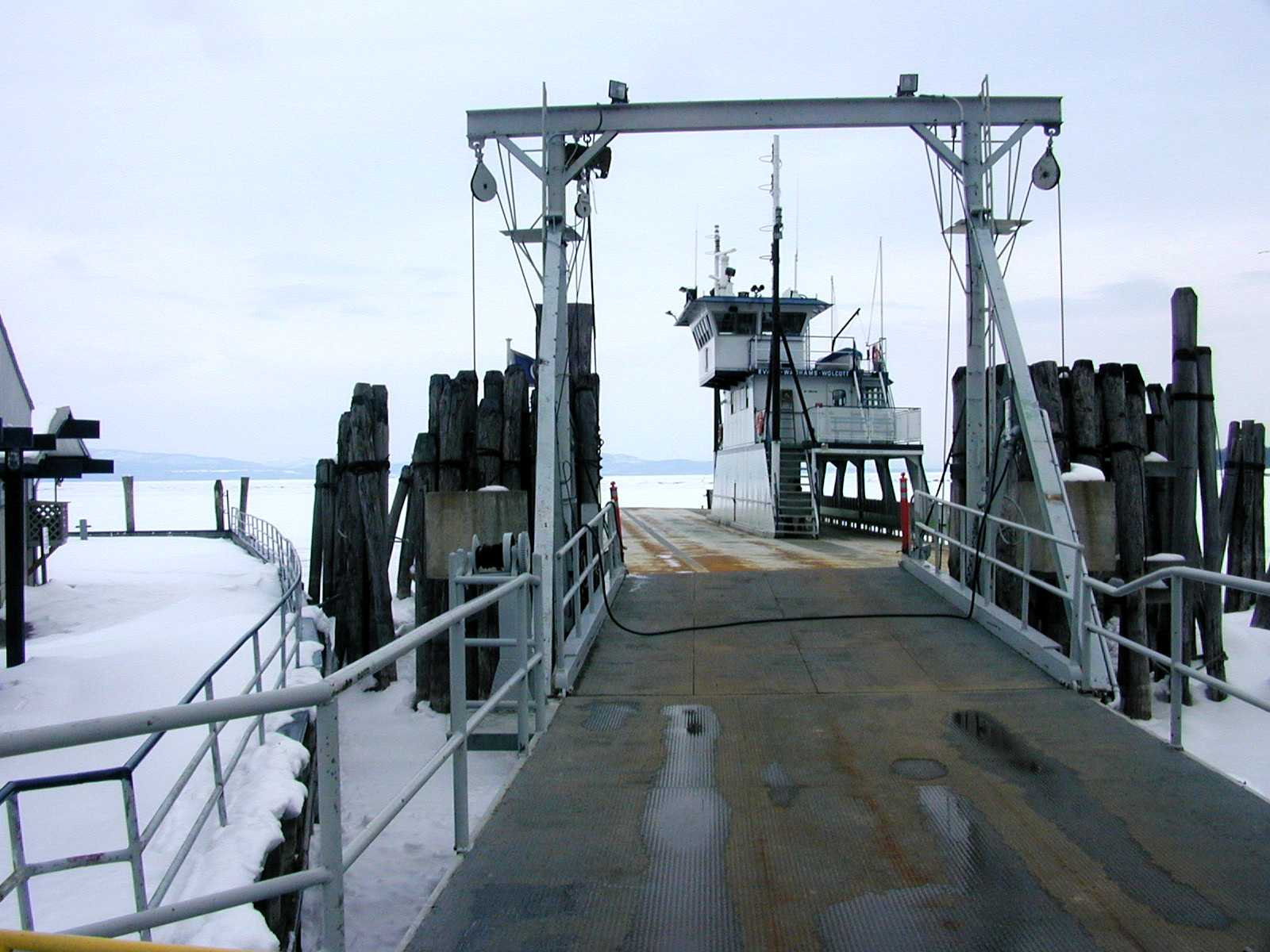
EWW sitting in the Grand Isle slip during ice-breaking season

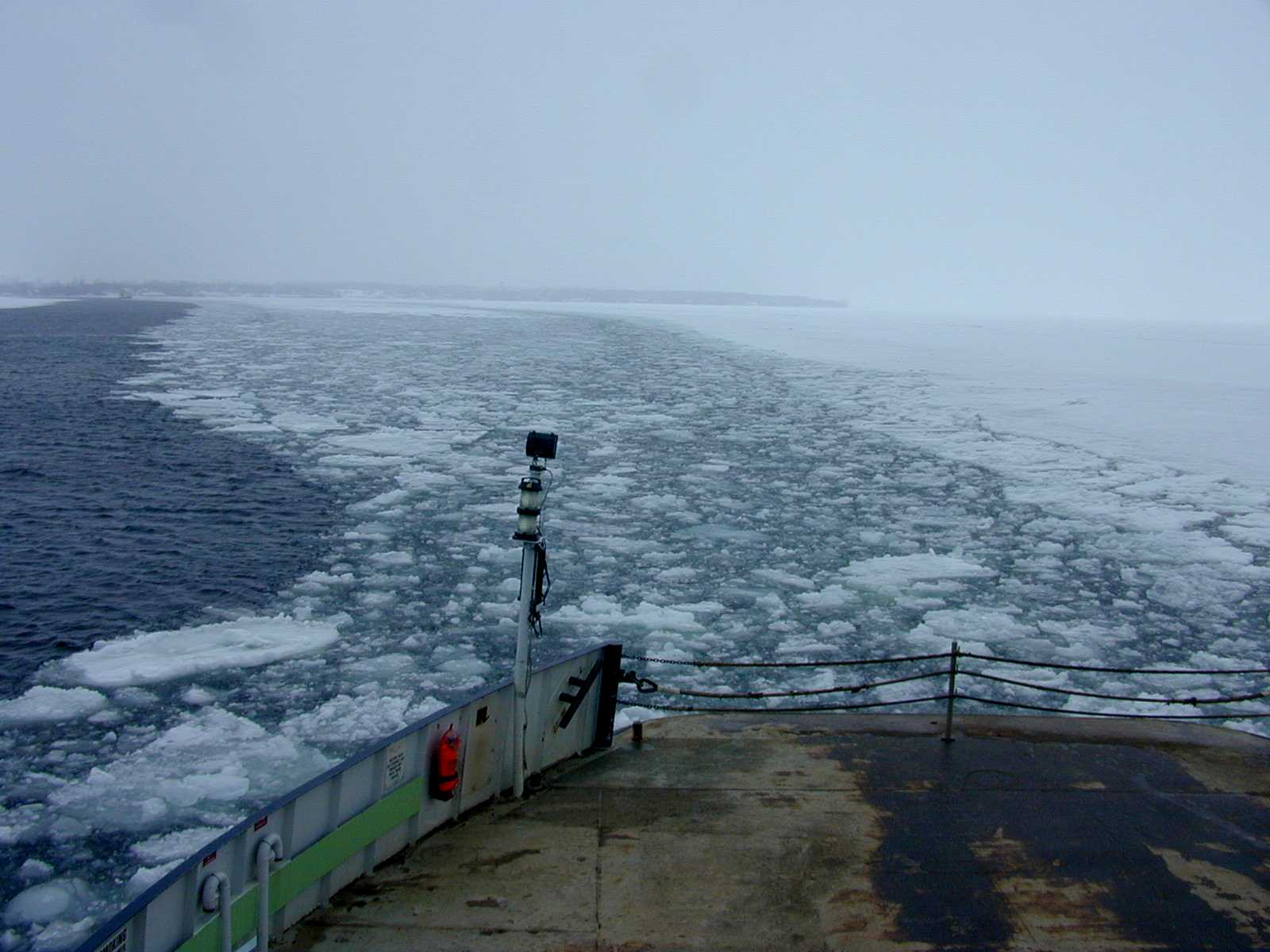
EWW moving west through the icy channel towards Plattsburgh

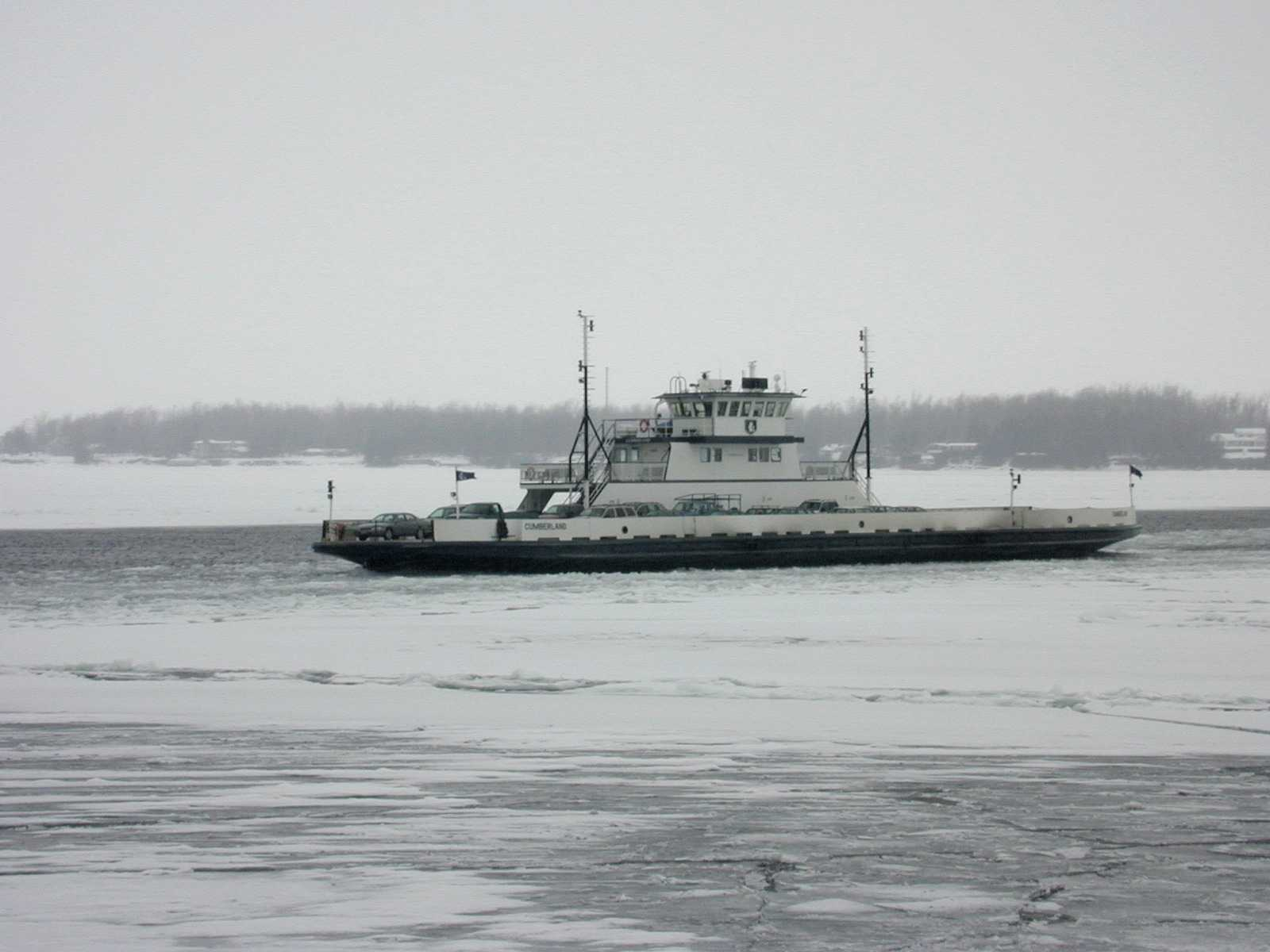
Cumberland headed east to Grand Isle

== See also ==
- Fort Ticonderoga Ferry – Cable ferry operating in the southern portion of Lake Champlain
- List of icebreakers
- Maritime Transportation Security Act
