= Cumberland Head Light =

Lighthouse in New York state

- Location: Cumberland Bay on Lake Champlain in New York
- Coordinates: 44°41′29″N 73°23′7″W

Tower
- Constructed: 1838
- Foundation: Concrete and Limestone
- Construction: Limestone
- Height: 15 m (49 ft)
- Shape: Conical

Light
- First lit: 1868
- Deactivated: 1934-2003
- Focal height: 23 m (75 ft)
- Lens: Fourth Order Fresnel lens
- Range: 7 nmi (13 km; 8.1 mi)
- Characteristic: Flashing White 4 seconds

Cumberland Head Light is a lighthouse on Lake Champlain's Cumberland Bay in New York state.

The lighthouse was established in 1838 and the tower was first lit in 1868. The lighthouse was deactivated in 1934. The foundation of the lighthouse is concrete and limestone and the lighthouse itself is made out of limestone. The shape of the tower is conical. The original lens was a fourth order Fresnel lens installed in 1856.
