= Grande Île =

Grande Île or Grande-Île can mean:

- Grande Île, Strasbourg, in France
- Grande-Île, Normandy, in France
- Grande-Île, Quebec, in Canada
- la Grande île, one of the islands of the Archipelago of Saint-Pierre Lake, in Canada
- la Grande île, a French nickname for Madagascar

== See also ==
- Grand Isle (disambiguation)
- Grand Island (disambiguation)
