= Cumberland Bay State Park =

State park in Clinton County, New York

- Cumberland Bay State Park Beach

- Location within New York
- Type: State park
- Location: 152 Cumberland Head Road; Plattsburgh, New York
- Nearest city: Plattsburgh, New York
- Coordinates: 44°44′06″N 73°25′08″W
- Area: 350 acres (1.4 km^{2})
- Created: 1932
- Operator: New York State Office of Parks, Recreation and Historic Preservation
- Visitors: 47,432 (in 2014)
- Open: All year
- Website: Cumberland Bay State Park

Cumberland Bay State Park is a 350-acre (1.4 km^{2}) state park located in the Town of Plattsburgh in Clinton County, New York. The park is located on the Cumberland Head peninsula on the western shore of Lake Champlain.

== Park description ==
Cumberland Bay State Park offers a 2,700-foot (820 m) sand beach, picnic tables, a playground, and playing fields. The park also hosts a campground with 152 tent and trailer sites, 18 of which include electrical hookups. The campground is open May through October.

The park is a popular location for ice fishing during the winter months.

== See also ==
- List of New York state parks
