= Lake Champlain Basin Program =

Cross-regional initiative to improve Lake Champlain's water quality and ecological health

The Lake Champlain Basin Program (LCBP) is a program to restore and protect Lake Champlain and its surrounding watershed or drainage basin for future generations. The LCBP works in partnership with government agencies from New York, Vermont, and Quebec, private organizations, local communities, and individuals to coordinate and fund efforts which benefit the Lake Champlain Basin's water quality, fisheries, wetlands, wildlife, recreation, and cultural resources.

These efforts are guided by the 1996 lake management plan "Opportunities for Action: An Evolving Plan for the Lake Champlain Basin." In 2003, the plan was updated and signed by the governors of Vermont and New York, the regional administrators of the United States Environmental Protection Agency, and the prime minister of Quebec. The plan can be read in English and French on the LCBP website. The LCBP is currently working with its partners to implement this plan. Most funding for the LCBP is through the US Environmental Protection Agency. The plan is renowned as an interstate and international model for environmental cooperation.

A local grant program run by the LCBP supports lake-related projects by local communities and non-profit organizations. As of 2007, more than $3 million was targeted to projects in Vermont and New York. Funded projects cover all actions in the plan, from phosphorus reduction, to preventing the spread of nuisance species, to public education and outreach, to restoring important cultural heritage sites.

== Priorities ==
The top priorities of the management plan are:

1. Reduce phosphorus inputs to Lake Champlain to promote a healthy and diverse ecosystem and provide for sustainable human use and enjoyment of the Lake.
2. Reduce toxic contamination to protect public health and the Lake Champlain ecosystem.
3. Minimize the risks to humans from water-related health hazards in the Lake Champlain Basin.
4. Control the introduction, spread, and impact of non-native nuisance species in order to preserve the integrity of the Lake Champlain ecosystem.

== Other projects ==
Other projects include supporting a lake-wide monitoring program, funding scientific research about the lake, and creating an environmental indicators program to access the progress of lake management actions. Public outreach is supported through school programs, and the LCBP Resource Room at the ECHO, Leahy Center for Lake Champlain on the Burlington, Vermont Waterfront. The LCBP is taking a lead role in coordinating the bi-state commemoration of the 400th anniversary of Samuel de Champlain’s 1609 exploration of the Lake.
