= Split Rock Wildway =

Wildlife corridor in New York state

Coordinates: 44.299°N 73.447°W

Map of Split Rock

Image of Split Rock

The Split Rock Wildway is a proposed wildlife corridor between the Split Rock Wild Forest and the Jay Mountain Wilderness Area in the eastern Adirondack Park in Essex County, New York. The area is located within the Champlain Valley along Lake Champlain. The Wildway captures a diversity of natural communities in the northern hardwood forest ecosystem, including low-lying clayplain forests, wetlands, the Boquet River floodplain forest, montane spruce-fir forests, and sub-alpine flora. The Champlain Valley is a major flyway for hawks, songbirds, and waterfowl; of the 193 birds that breed in the Adirondacks, 155 are found in the valley. The Wildway provides habitat for a variety of wildlife, including mink, otter, white-tailed deer, fisher, and bobcats. The northernmost population of eastern timber rattlesnakes, an endangered species in New York, inhabits rocky outcrops in the Split Rock Wild Forest. The majority of land in the Wildway is privately owned and at risk to land subdivision and habitat fragmentation.
