= Grand Isle (island) =

Island in Vermont, United States

Coordinates: 44.680°N 73.327°W

Location in Grand Isle County and the state of Vermont.

Grand Isle, also known as South Hero Island, is the largest island in Lake Champlain, Vermont, United States. It has a land area of 31.61 square miles (81.9 km^{2}). The island comprises the two towns of Grand Isle and South Hero and makes up the southern portion of Grand Isle County, Vermont. The total population as of the 2000 census was 3,651.
