= Grand Island Senior High School =

Grand Island Senior High School may refer to:

- Grand Island Senior High School (Nebraska) in Grand Island, Nebraska
- Grand Island Senior High School (New York) in Grand Island, New York
  - also see Grand Island Central School District
