= Grand Isle, Vermont =

- Town
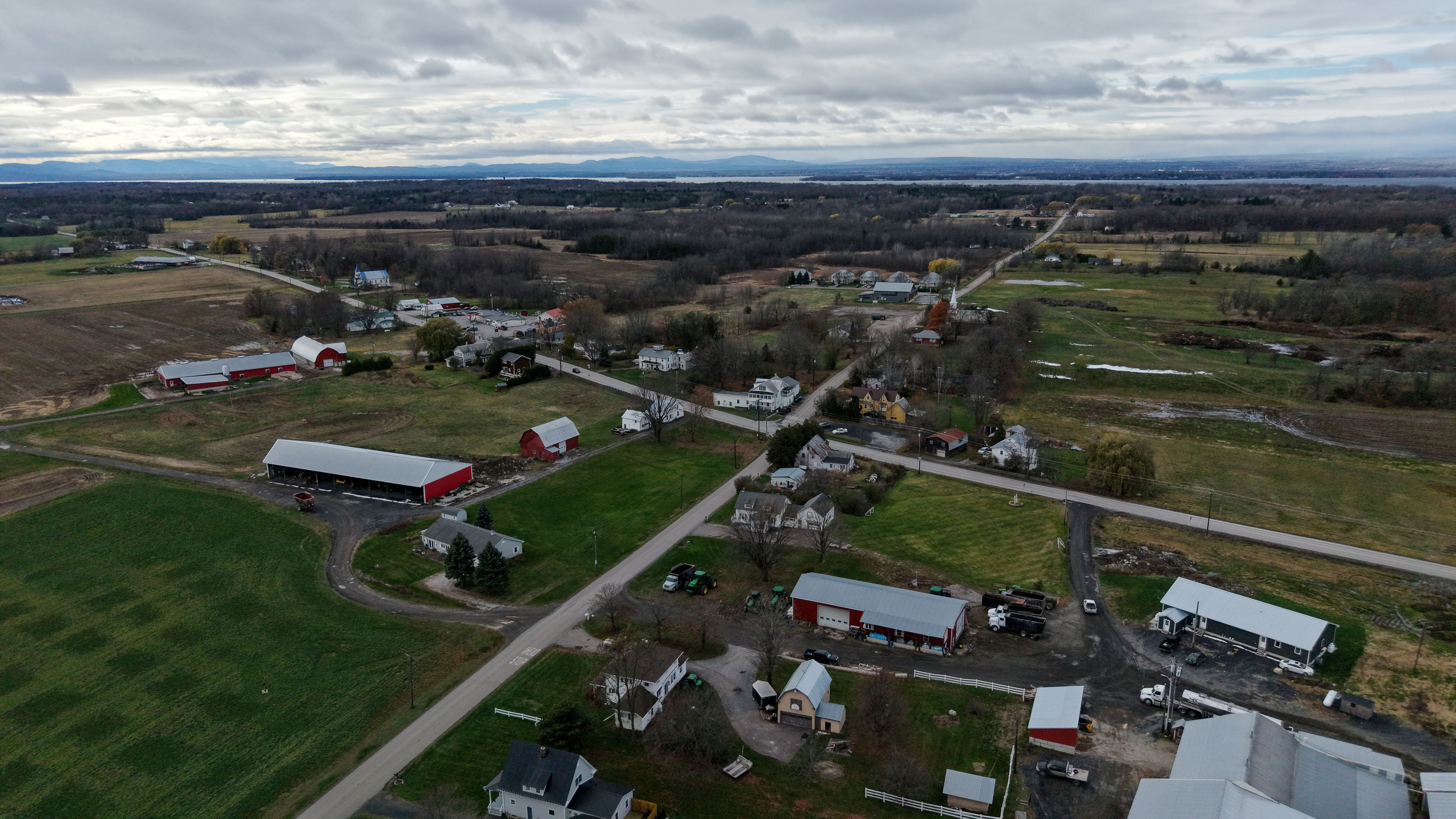
- Grand Isle, VT, from the east

- Seal
- Motto: "Beauty Spot of Vermont"
- Location in Grand Isle County and the state of Vermont
- Coordinates: 44°43′21″N 73°17′36″W
- Country: United States
- State: Vermont
- County: Grand Isle
- Communities: Grand Isle; Adams Landing; Gordon Landing; Grand Isle Station; Pearl

Area
  - Total: 35.1 sq mi (91.0 km^{2})
  - Land: 16.4 sq mi (42.5 km^{2})
  - Water: 18.7 sq mi (48.5 km^{2})
- Elevation: 171 ft (52 m)

Population (2020)
  - Total: 2,086
  - Density: 127/sq mi (49.1/km^{2})
- Time zone: UTC-5 (Eastern (EST))
  - Summer (DST): UTC-4 (EDT)
- ZIP code: 05458
- Area code: 802
- FIPS code: 50-29275
- GNIS feature ID: 1462107
- Website: www.grandislevt.org

Grand Isle is a town on Grand Isle in Grand Isle County, Vermont, United States. The population was 2,086 at the 2020 census.

A landing for the Lake Champlain Transportation Company's ferry to Plattsburgh, New York, at Cumberland Head is located on the western shore of Grand Isle at Gordon's Landing.

== History ==
The town was originally named "Middle Hero" when it was subdivided from the town of "South Hero" in November 1798. In November 1810, the town was renamed "Grand Isle".

== Geography ==
The town of Grand Isle occupies the northern half of South Hero Island, also known as "Grand Isle", in Lake Champlain. It is bordered to the south by the town of South Hero and to the north by the town of North Hero, both in Grand Isle County. To the west, across the western channel of Lake Champlain, is the town of Plattsburgh in Clinton County, New York, while to the east, across the eastern channel of Lake Champlain, is the town of Milton in Chittenden County, and the town of St. Albans in Franklin County. The town of Grand Isle includes Savage Island in the eastern part of town, and the much smaller Young Island and Bixby Island, comprising the Sister Islands, in the northwestern part of town. Grand Isle State Park, with frontage on Lake Champlain, is in the southeastern part of town.

According to the United States Census Bureau, the town has a total area of 35.1 square miles (91.0 km^{2}), of which 16.4 square miles (42.5 km^{2}) are land and 18.7 square miles (48.5 km^{2}), or 53.27%, are water.

== Demographics ==
Historical population
Census	Pop.	Note	%±
1800	678		—
1810	623		−8.1%
1820	698		12.0%
1830	648		−7.2%
1840	724		11.7%
1850	666		−8.0%
1860	708		6.3%
1870	682		−3.7%
1880	749		9.8%
1890	793		5.9%
1900	851		7.3%
1910	839		−1.4%
1920	808		−3.7%
1930	857		6.1%
1940	791		−7.7%
1950	735		−7.1%
1960	624		−15.1%
1970	809		29.6%
1980	1,238		53.0%
1990	1,642		32.6%
2000	1,955		19.1%
2010	2,067		5.7%
2020	2,086		0.9%
U.S. Decennial Census

As of the census of 2000, there were 1,955 people, 772 households, and 572 families residing in the town. The population density was 118.4 people per square mile (45.7/km^{2}). There were 1,047 housing units at an average density of 63.4 per square mile (24.5/km^{2}). The racial makeup of the town was 97.54% White, 0.20% African American, 0.31% Native American, 0.36% Asian, and 1.59% from two or more races. Hispanic or Latino of any race were 0.56% of the population.

There were 772 households, out of which 32.8% had children under the age of 18 living with them, 63.2% were married couples living together, 7.1% had a female householder with no husband present, and 25.9% were non-families. 20.2% of all households were made up of individuals, and 6.9% had someone living alone who was 65 years of age or older. The average household size was 2.53 and the average family size was 2.91.

In the town, the population was spread out, with 25.3% under the age of 18, 4.9% from 18 to 24, 30.1% from 25 to 44, 29.4% from 45 to 64, and 10.4% who were 65 years of age or older. The median age was 40 years. For every 100 females, there were 101.3 males. For every 100 females age 18 and over, there were 98.6 males.

The median income for a household in the town was $48,594, and the median income for a family was $52,143. Males had a median income of $39,191 versus $25,900 for females. The per capita income for the town was $22,955. About 2.7% of families and 4.2% of the population were below the poverty line, including 2.5% of those under age 18 and 6.4% of those age 65 or over.

== Notable person ==
- Herman R. Beardsley, Justice of the Vermont Supreme Court
