= Grand Isle State Park (Vermont) =

State park in Grand Isle County, Vermont

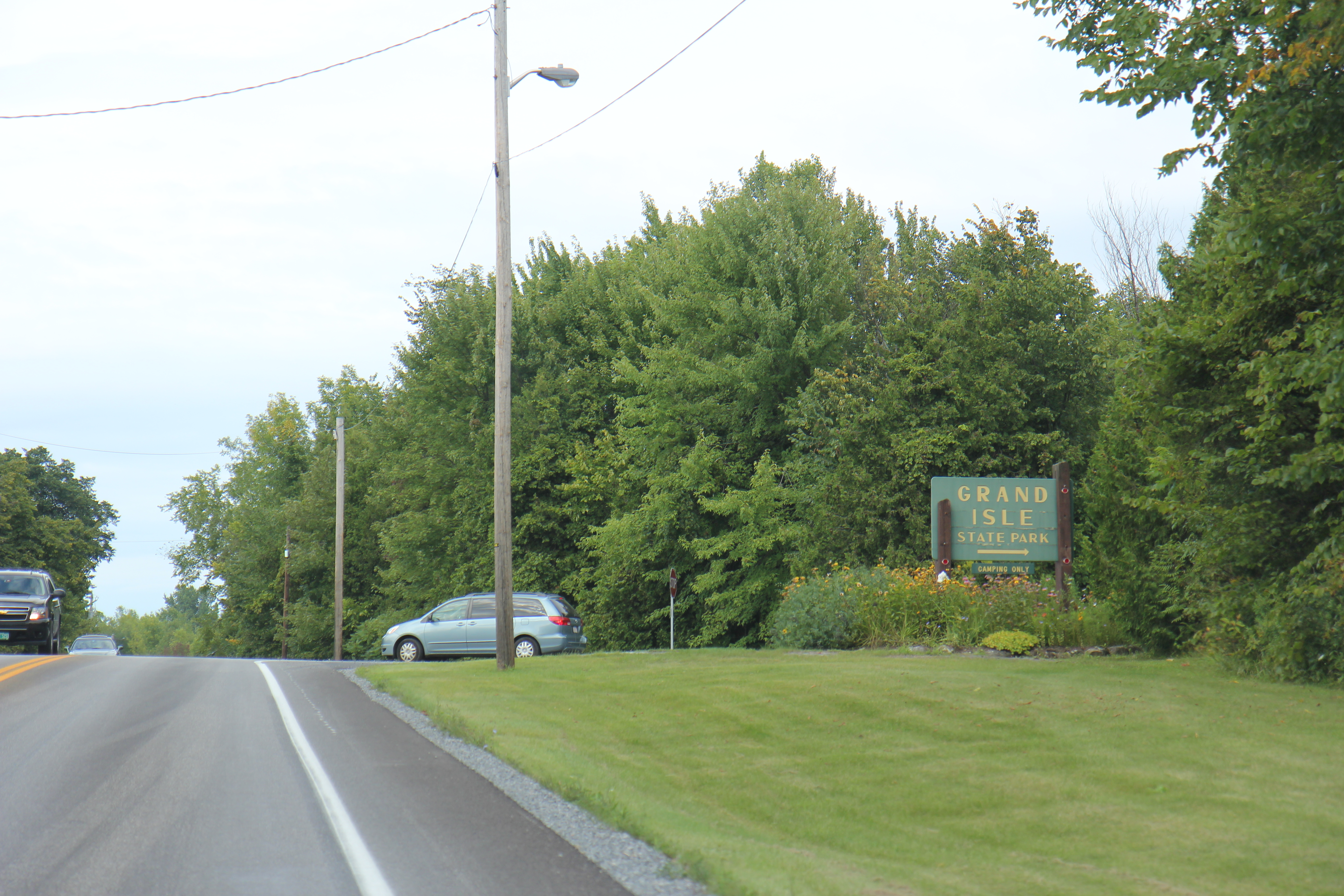
- Entrance

- Location within Vermont
- Interactive map of Grand Isle State Park
- Location: Grand Isle, Vermont, United States
- Coordinates: 44°41′12″N 73°17′28″W
- Area: 226 acres (91 ha)
- Established: 1959
- Administrator: Vermont Department of Forests, Parks, and Recreation
- Website: Official website
- Vermont State Parks

Grand Isle State Park is a 226-acre state park in Grand Isle, Vermont on the shore of Lake Champlain. Activities includes boating, swimming, camping, fishing, hiking, picnicking, bicycling, wildlife watching, water sports and winter sports. Facilities include a boat launching ramp, sand-court volleyball, horseshoes, a play area, 117 tent/RV sites, 36 lean-to sites, 4 cabin sites, restrooms with running water and hot showers, and a trailer sanitary station. The park features a nature center and park rangers offer interpretive programs including night hikes, campfire programs, amphibian explorations, and nature crafts and games.
