= Groton Nature Center =

- Interactive map of Groton Nature Center
- Type: Nature center
- Location: 1595 Boulder Beach Road; Groton, Vermont
- Coordinates: 44.286°N 72.265°W
- Operator: Vermont Department of Forests, Parks, and Recreation
- Status: Memorial Day Weekend - Columbus Day Weekend
- Website: http://www.vtstateparks.com/htm/groton-nature.html

Groton Nature Center is a nature center in Groton, Vermont that serves seven area state parks located in Groton State Forest. The free-to-the-public nature center features themed, tactile, and interactive exhibits on park resources, geography, plant and animal life, and human history. The nature center provides educational supplies to help visitors explore the natural world. The center offers naturalist programs, hikes and concerts. Visitors can obtain maps and trail guides for the parks and forest.

The Center is within walking distance of Big Deer State Park, Stillwater State Park and Boulder Beach State Park. The other parks in Groton State Forest are Kettle Pond State Park, New Discovery State Park, Ricker Pond State Park and Seyon Lodge State Park.

Groton Nature Center is operated by the Vermont Department of Forests, Parks, and Recreation, as part of the Vermont State Park system.

In June 2023, the Groton Nature Center celebrated a grand reopening after significant renovations to the structure and exhibits. Vermont Parks Forever, the non-profit foundation for Vermont’s state parks worked with ECHO, Leahy Center for Lake Champlain and Vermont State Parks to collaborate on the renovation of the Groton Nature Center. Interpretive displays, created and installed by the ECHO, Leahy Center for Lake Champlain, were funded by Vermont Parks Forever donors. Reconstruction of the nature center was funded by the Land and Water Conservation Fund. Construction began in summer 2022.

As of 2024, the Groton Nature Center is open to the public free of charge from the start of summer until Labor Day, Tuesday through Sunday, 9:30am to 6pm. Two park interpreters are employed along with various volunteers to staff the facility and offer programs on a variety of subjects related to Groton State Forest.
