= WYKR-FM =

WYKR-FM and WTWN
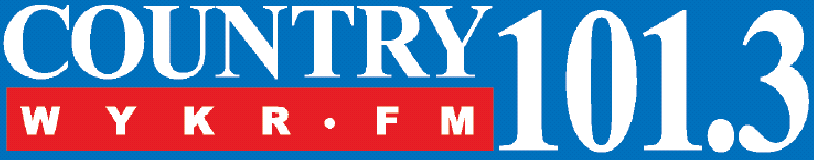

WYKR-FM: Haverhill, New Hampshire; WTWN: Wells River, Vermont; United States
- Broadcast area: Northeast Vermont & Northwest New Hampshire
- Frequencies: WYKR-FM: 101.3 MHz; WTWN: 1100 kHz
- Branding: WYKR Country 101.3

Programming
- Format: Country
- Affiliations: CBS News Radio; Westwood One; Motor Racing Network

Ownership
- Owner: Joshua Smith; (Yankee Kingdom Media Corp.)

History
- First air date: WYKR-FM: February 19, 1990; WTWN: October 3, 1976
- Former call signs: WTWN: WYKR (1976–1999)
- Former frequencies: WTWN: 1490 kHz (1976–1987)
- Call sign meaning: WTWN: "Twin State"

Technical information
- Licensing authority: FCC
- Facility ID: WYKR-FM: 53866; WTWN: 53865
- Class: WYKR-FM: A; WTWN: D
- Power: WTWN: 5,000 watts daytime; 2,000 watts critical hours
- ERP: WYKR-FM: 3,000 watts
- HAAT: WYKR-FM: 12 meters (39 ft)
- Transmitter coordinates: WYKR-FM: 44°6′49.2″N 71°58′52.3″W; WTWN: 44°8′55.23″N 72°4′0.33″W
- Translator(s): WTWN: 105.1 W286DE (Wells River)

Links
- Public license information: WYKR-FM: Public file; LMS; WTWN: Public file; LMS
- Webcast: Listen live
- Website: www.wykr.com

WYKR-FM (101.3 FM) is a radio station licensed to serve Haverhill, New Hampshire. It airs a country music format. WYKR-FM's programming is also heard on daytime-only station WTWN (1100 AM) and FM translator W286DE (105.1) in Wells River, Vermont. Both WYKR-FM and WTWN are owned by Joshua Smith's Yankee Kingdom Media Corp.

WYKR began broadcasting in 1976 over the AM station in Wells River, which operated at 1490 kHz until 1987. WYKR-FM was added in 1990. WYKR AM became WTWN in 1999, and aired Christian radio programming during the 2000s before returning to the WYKR-FM simulcast. The Puffer family owned the stations from 1976 until 2023, when they were acquired by Yankee Kingdom Media Corp.

== History ==
WYKR went on the air October 3, 1976, under the ownership of Eugene and Harold Puffer, doing business as the Puffer Brothers. The station's studios were located in the former Wells River Graded School. Harold Puffer left the station in 1981 to return to the insurance business; the following year, Eugene Puffer—who had previously worked at WCVR in Randolph—transferred WYKR's license to a new company, Puffer Broadcasting. WYKR was a 1,000-watt station at 1490 kHz until 1987, when it moved to 1100 kHz and boosted power to 5,000 watts.

In the late 1980s, Puffer Broadcasting obtained a construction permit for an FM station at 101.3 MHz, with the intent of simulcasting WYKR's country music programming. The new station was assigned the WYKR-FM call sign by the Federal Communications Commission on November 10, 1988, and went on the air February 19, 1990. The AM station changed its call sign from WYKR to WTWN, for "Twin State", on April 16, 1999; by June 2000, WTWN was a Christian radio station.

Puffer Broadcasting sold WYKR-FM and WTWN to Joshua Smith, through his Yankee Kingdom Media Corp., for $125,000 in 2023; the stations' towers, which the Puffers had separately held through Mill Street Enterprises, were also concurrently acquired by Smith.

== Translator ==
Broadcast translator for WTWN
Call sign	Frequency	City of license	FID	ERP (W)	Class	Transmitter coordinates	FCC info
W286DE	105.1 FM	Wells River, Vermont	200081	250	D	44°6′49″N 71°58′52″W	LMS
