= Kettle Pond State Park =

State park in Washington County, Vermont

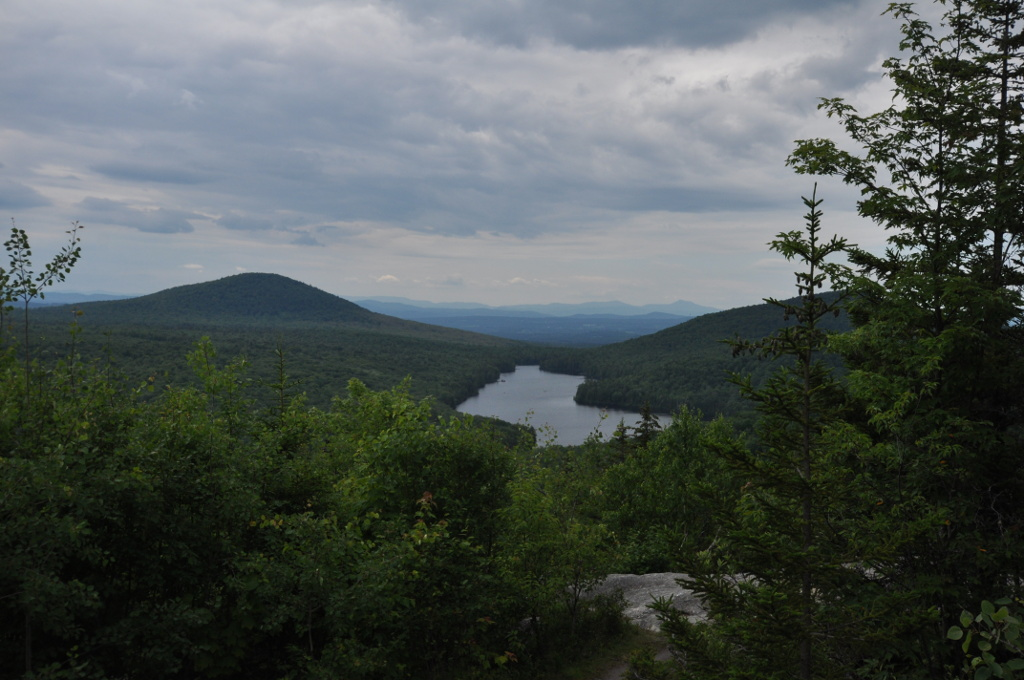
- Kettle Pond as seen from Owl's Head in nearby New Discovery State Park

- Location within Vermont
- Interactive map of Kettle Pond State Park
- Location: Marshfield, Vermont, United States
- Coordinates: 44°17′40″N 72°18′28″W
- Administrator: Vermont Department of Forests, Parks, and Recreation
- Website: Official website
- Vermont State Parks

Kettle Pond State Park is a state park near Marshfield, Vermont, in the United States. It is one of seven state parks located in Groton State Forest. The park is on Vermont Route 232 two miles west of Groton.

The park is located on Kettle Pond (109 acres), an undeveloped pond. Activities includes camping, boating, fishing, swimming, hiking, snowshoeing and cross-country skiing.

Features include 26 lean-tos arranged into five separate groups designed to accommodate groups. There are also individual lean-tos. There is a composting toilet for each group site and two double pit toilets, but no potable water at this site. There are six remote campsites/lean-tos on the pond.
