= New Discovery =

New Discovery may refer to:

- New Discovery, an album by Artension
- New Discovery State Park, Vermont, United States
