= Stillwater State Park =

State park in Caledonia County, Vermont

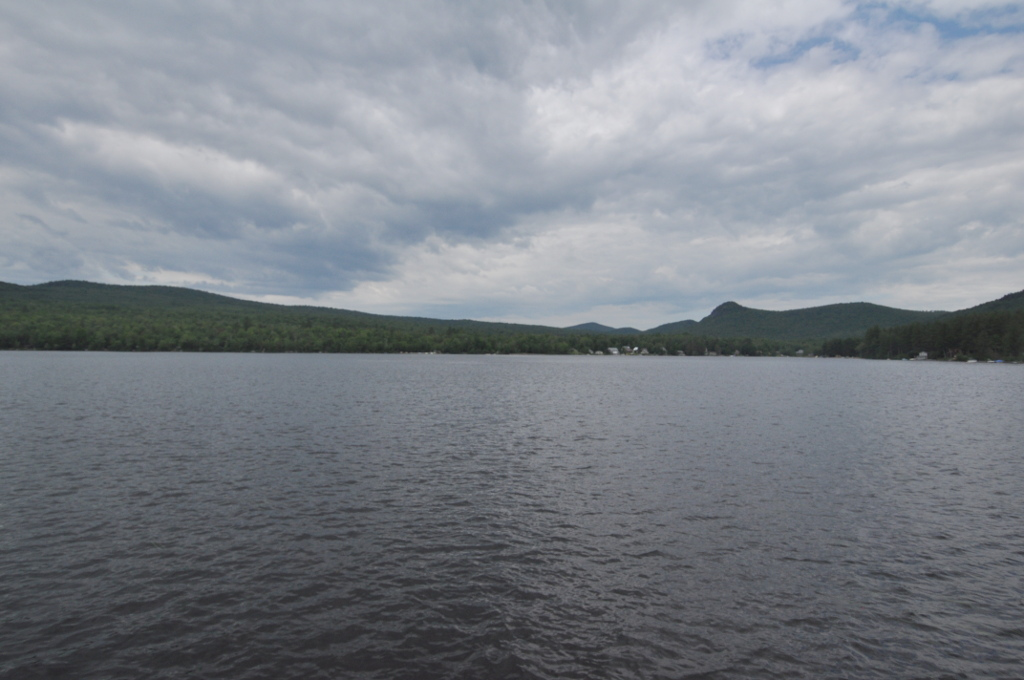
- View of the park from across the lake at Boulder Beach State Park
- Interactive map of Stillwater State Park
- Type: State park
- Location: 44 Stillwater Rd. Groton, Vermont
- Operator: Vermont Department of Forests, Parks, and Recreation
- Status: Memorial Day weekend - Labor Day weekend
- Website: https://vtstateparks.com/stillwater.html
- Stillwater State Park
- U.S. National Register of Historic Places
- U.S. Historic district
- Location within Vermont Location within the United States
- Location: 126 Boulder Beach Rd., Groton, Vermont
- Coordinates: 44.2799°N 72.2729°W
- Area: 57 acres (23 ha)
- Built: 1938
- Built by: CCC
- Architectural style: CCC
- MPS: Historic Park Landscapes in National and State Parks MPS
- NRHP reference No.: 02000278
- Added to NRHP: March 29, 2002

Stillwater State Park is a state park located on Lake Groton in Groton, Vermont. The park is located in Groton State Forest close to the Groton Nature Center, Boulder Beach State Park and Big Deer State Park. The park offers camping, picnicking, and access to water-related activities on Lake Groton. The park was developed in the 1930s by crews of the Civilian Conservation Corps (CCC). It is open to the public between Memorial Day weekend and Columbus Day weekend; fees are charged for day use and camping.

== Features ==
The park is located in northern Groton, between Vermont Route 232 and Lake Groton off Boulder Beach Road. The park is 57 acres (23 ha) on the west side of the lake, which is ringed by vacation cottages and the facilities of the Groton Nature Center, Boulder Beach State Park and Big Deer State Park, also state parks. From the contact station a short way off Boulder Beach Road, the camp road divides to provide access to camping and recreational areas on either side of Stillwater Creek. To the left is a campground loop, originally built as a picnic area by the CCC. To the right is a second, larger campground loop, which includes day use facilities near the ranger's house at the northern end. The campground has a total of 62 tent/RV sites and 17 lean-tos. All rest rooms include hot showers. A sanitary dump station is available, but no hookups. There is a swimming beach, boat launch/dock facility, play area, shelter, and access to hiking trails.

== History ==
The park facilities were developed in 1938 by the CCC, on state forest land the state began purchasing in 1919. The CCC was also responsible for building Vermont Route 232, which provides access into the forest. Crews built the park access roads, a picnic area on the north side of the creek, and a camp loop (about half the extant loop) on the south side. Surviving elements of their work include the ranger's house, the picnic shelter in the north loop, numerous stone fireplaces, and several leanto camping shelters. The north loop was converted into a campground in the late 1960s, when the southern loop was also enlarged. The park was listed on the National Register of Historic Places in 2002 for its well-preserved CCC architecture.

== See also ==
- National Register of Historic Places listings in Caledonia County, Vermont
