= J. R. Darling Store =

- J.R. Darling Store
- U.S. National Register of Historic Places
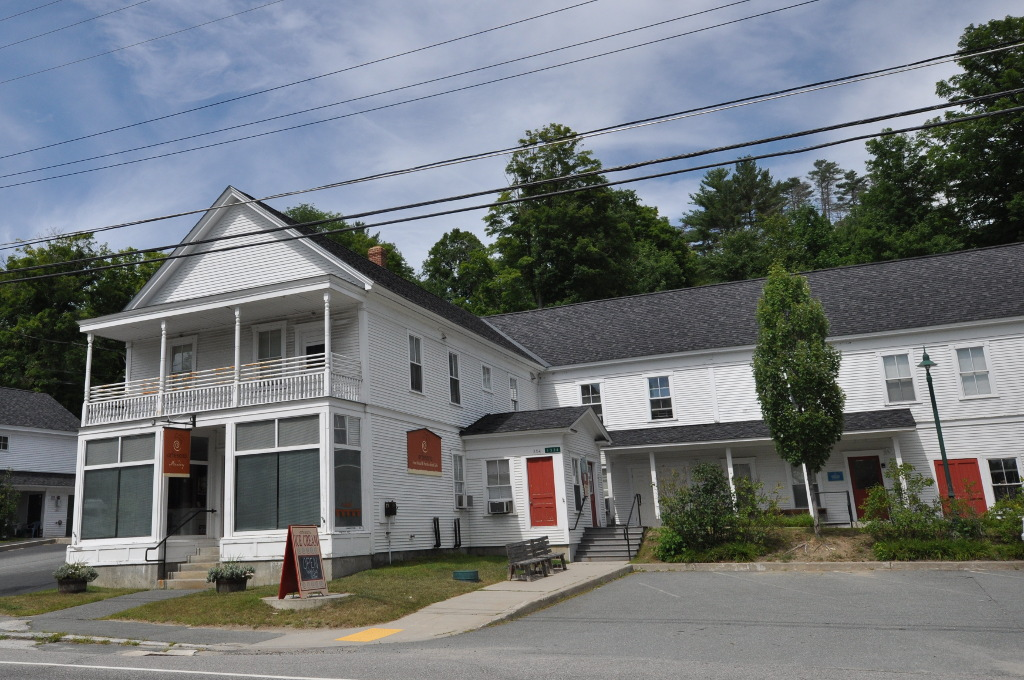

- Location within Vermont Location within the United States
- Location: 284 Scott Highway, Groton, Vermont
- Coordinates: 44°12′44″N 72°11′41″W
- Area: 0.8 acres (0.32 ha)
- Built: 1895
- Built by: Carpenter, George; Hayes, Fred E.
- Architectural style: Colonial Revival, Early Commercial
- NRHP reference No.: 04000442
- Added to NRHP: May 12, 2004

The J.R. Darling Store is a historic commercial building at 1334 Scott Highway (United States Route 302) in Groton, Vermont. It was built about 1895 on a site that has long housed commercial activity, and was the town's last general store. It was listed on the National Register of Historic Places in 2004.

== Description and history ==
The J.R. Darling Store is located in the linear village center of Groton, on the north side of Scott Highway near its junction with Powder Spring Road. Scott Highway (US 302) is a major regional east–west route, connecting to Montpelier in the west and Littleton, New Hampshire in the east, and points beyond. The store is an L-shaped 2 1/2-story wood-frame structure, with a gabled roof and mostly granite foundation. The exterior is finished in a combination of wooden clapboards and vinyl siding, and has modest vernacular Victorian decoration. The front facade has a recessed entrance flanked by a square commercial display windows, with an open balustraded porch above. A secondary entrance projects from the side of the main block. A residential ell extends to the right of the main block from its rear, with part covered by a single-story shed-roof porch.

The location where the Darling Store stands has a commercial history, including a tailor's shop established by one of Groton's first white settlers in the early 19th century. Later, a tavern with meeting hall was built in the site; the hall was for many years where town meetings were held. About 1877, Jonathan R. Darling, a prominent local businessman and politician, purchased the property, and relocated the tavern portion to adjacent land (where it now forms part of the Alice Lord Goodine House, the public library). The oldest portion of the present building, its front section, was built about 1895, and it was enlarged several times, achieving its present form in the 1920s. Portions of the building were extensively damaged by a fire in 1980, but were sympathetically rebuilt. The building now houses residences in the rear and a winery shop in the front retail section.

== See also ==
- National Register of Historic Places listings in Caledonia County, Vermont
