= Ryegate, Vermont =

- Town
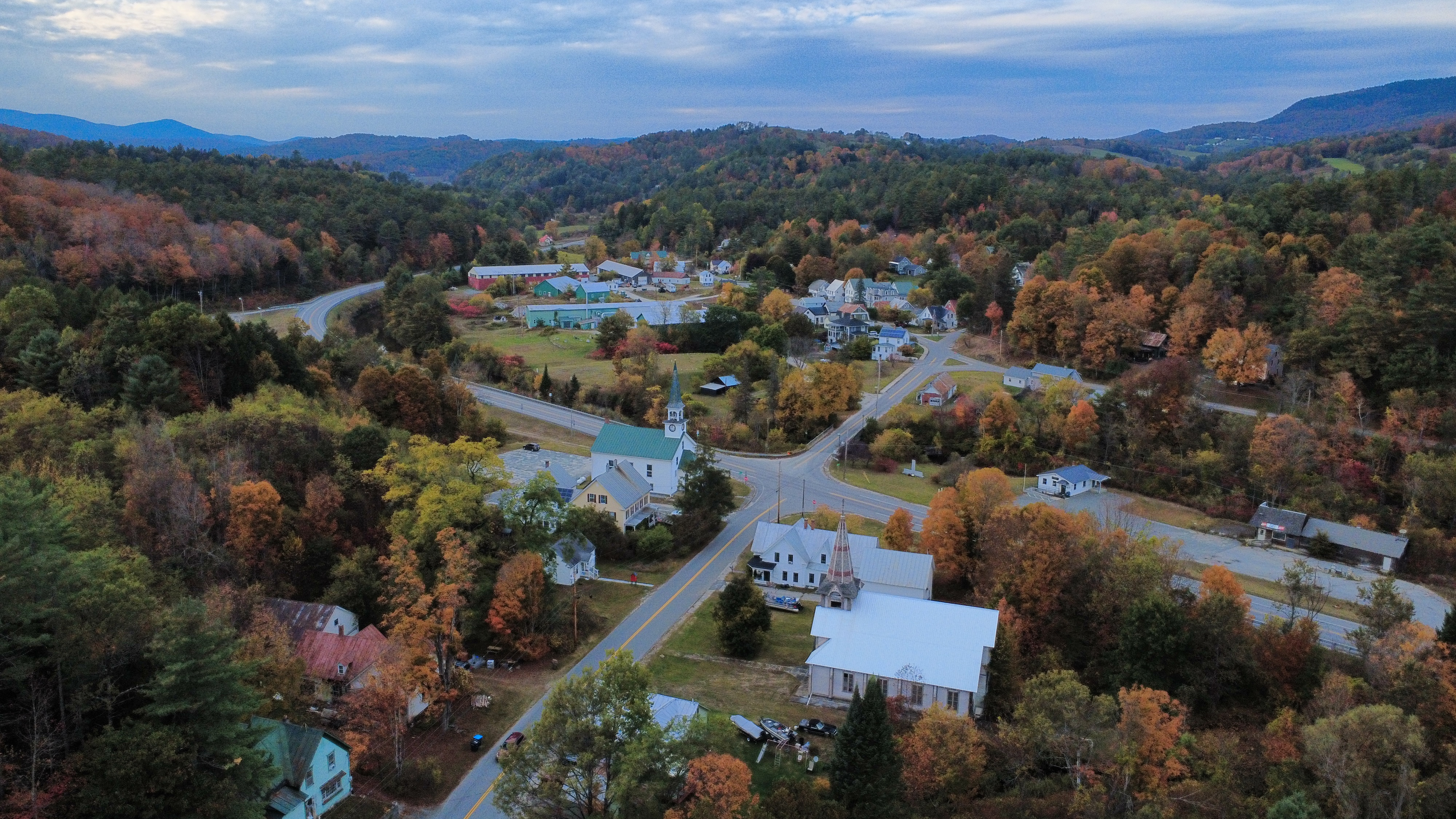
- South Ryegate, VT, from the southeast

- Seal

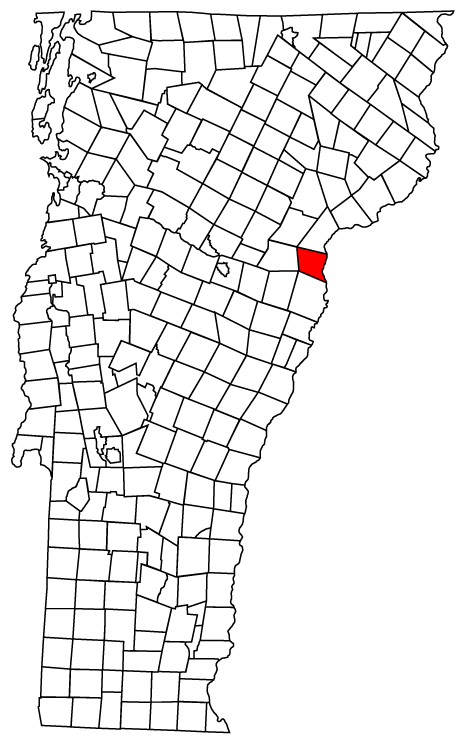
- Ryegate, Vermont
- Coordinates: 44°14′23″N 72°07′52″W
- Country: United States
- State: Vermont
- County: Caledonia
- Chartered: 1763
- Communities: East Ryegate; Ryegate Corner; South Ryegate

Area
  - Total: 36.8 sq mi (95.2 km^{2})
  - Land: 36.5 sq mi (94.5 km^{2})
  - Water: 0.31 sq mi (0.8 km^{2})
- Elevation: 1,207 ft (368 m)

Population (2020)
  - Total: 1,167
  - Density: 32/sq mi (12.3/km^{2})
- Time zone: UTC-5 (Eastern (EST))
  - Summer (DST): UTC-4 (EDT)
- ZIP codes: 05042 (East Ryegate); 05069 (South Ryegate); 05081 (Wells River); 05046 (Groton)
- Area code: 802
- FIPS code: 50-61525
- GNIS feature ID: 1462195
- Website: www.ryegatevt.org

Ryegate is a town in Caledonia County, Vermont, United States. The population was 1,165 at the 2020 census. The town contains the villages of South Ryegate, East Ryegate, and Ryegate Corner.

== History ==
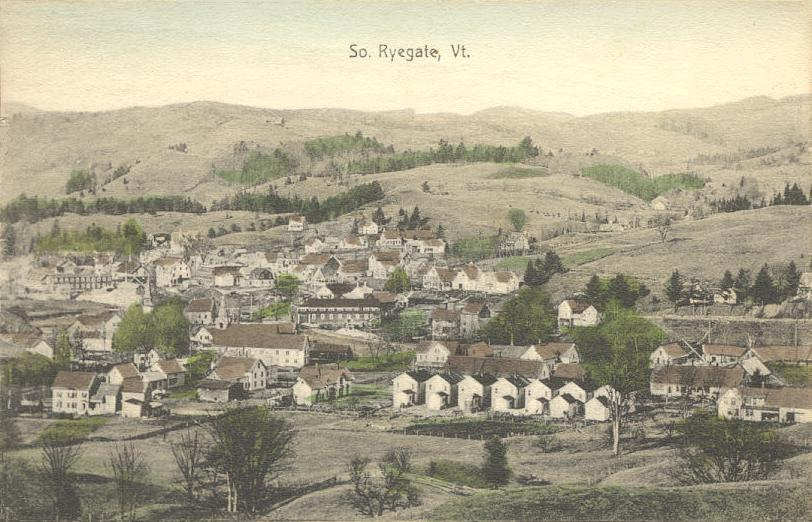
South Ryegate in 1909

One of the New Hampshire Grants, it was chartered by Governor Benning Wentworth on September 8, 1763. Granted to Richard Jenness and 93 others, it was named Ryegate, a variant spelling of Reigate in Surrey, England. The first settlers were Aaron Hosmer and his family. Sold to John Witherspoon and others, the southern half of town was purchased in 1773 by two agents for the Scotch American Company of Farmers from Renfrew and Lanark, Scotland, whose members began settlement in 1774.

The town had excellent soil for the cultivation of grains, vegetables and orchards. Streams teemed with salmon and trout. Hills and valleys provided pasturage for grazing sheep and cattle. Connected in 1847 to the Connecticut & Passumpsic Rivers Railroad, the town by 1859 was noted for producing butter and leather. The Wells River supplied water power for one gristmill and five sawmills. In 1873, the Montpelier & Wells River Railroad was completed. In 1890, a big brickyard opened; then in 1906, the Ryegate Paper Company began operation. But the town's dominant industry was six granite quarries at Blue Mountain.

== Geography ==
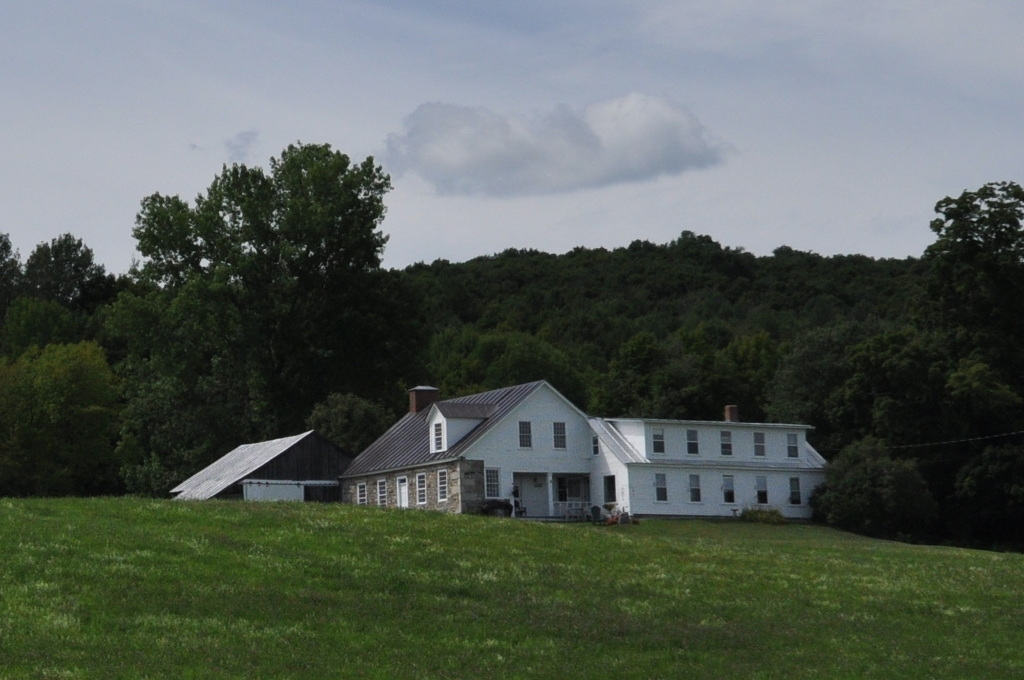
Built in 1808 by Scottish settlers, the Whitehill House is the oldest surviving home in Ryegate

According to the United States Census Bureau, the town has a total area of 36.8 square miles (95.2 km^{2}), of which 36.5 square miles (94.5 km^{2}) is land and 0.31 square miles (0.8 km^{2}), or 0.80%, is water. Bounded on the east by the Connecticut River (the boundary between Vermont and New Hampshire), Ryegate is drained by the Wells River. Blue Mountain, the highest point in the town, has an elevation of 2,192 feet (668 m) above sea level.

The town is crossed by Interstate 91, U.S. Route 5, and U.S. Route 302. It is bordered by the town of Newbury to the south, Groton to the west, and Barnet to the north. To the east, across the Connecticut River lies Bath, New Hampshire.

== Demographics ==
Historical population
Census	Pop.	Note	%±
1790	187		—
1800	406		117.1%
1810	812		100.0%
1820	994		22.4%
1830	1,119		12.6%
1840	1,222		9.2%
1850	1,606		31.4%
1860	1,098		−31.6%
1870	935		−14.8%
1880	1,046		11.9%
1890	1,126		7.6%
1900	995		−11.6%
1910	1,194		20.0%
1920	1,188		−0.5%
1930	1,216		2.4%
1940	1,105		−9.1%
1950	996		−9.9%
1960	894		−10.2%
1970	830		−7.2%
1980	1,000		20.5%
1990	1,058		5.8%
2000	1,150		8.7%
2010	1,174		2.1%
2020	1,165		−0.8%
U.S. Decennial Census

As of the census of 2000, there were 1,150 people, 435 households, and 324 families residing in the town. The population density was 31.4 people per square mile (12.1/km^{2}). There were 564 housing units at an average density of 15.4 per square mile (6.0/km^{2}). The racial makeup of the town was 98.35% White, 0.09% African American, 0.43% Native American, 0.35% Asian, and 0.78% from two or more races. Hispanic or Latino of any race were 0.17% of the population.

There were 435 households, out of which 31.3% had children under the age of 18 living with them, 61.8% were married couples living together, 7.4% had a female householder with no husband present, and 25.3% were non-families. 19.8% of all households were made up of individuals, and 7.8% had someone living alone who was 65 years of age or older. The average household size was 2.64 and the average family size was 3.05.

In the town, the population was spread out, with 25.2% under the age of 18, 7.0% from 18 to 24, 24.6% from 25 to 44, 28.4% from 45 to 64, and 14.7% who were 65 years of age or older. The median age was 41 years. For every 100 females, there were 107.2 males. For every 100 females age 18 and over, there were 100.0 males.

The median income for a household in the town was $36,761, and the median income for a family was $41,607. Males had a median income of $26,875 versus $21,705 for females. The per capita income for the town was $17,880. About 3.3% of families and 5.9% of the population were below the poverty line, including 6.2% of those under age 18 and 5.2% of those age 65 or over.

== Education ==
The Blue Mountain Union School (BMU) serves students from the town of Ryegate and consists of Pre-K through grade 12 housed in one building. Total enrollment for the 2017–2018 school year was 419 students. BMU is located on Route 302 (Exit 17 off Interstate-91), just east from P & H Truckstop.

The Blue Mountain Union School District was formed in November 1964 merging the Wells River Graded School District, the Groton Town School District, and the Ryegate Town School District. This merger resulted in the closing of five local schools: Groton School, Wells River School, South Ryegate School, Ryegate Corner School, and East Ryegate School. The merger also removed the option for high school choice in the town of Ryegate, in favor of attending the new union high school. Although the merger was approved in 1964, there was a lengthy legal battle regarding the formation of the district, and the new district did not operate a school building until 1970.

On July 1, 2018, the State Board of Education temporarily reassigned the Blue Mountain Union School District to Orange East Supervisory under the Act 46 school district consolidation law. Merger plans and implementation continue following lawsuits and local district votes. Blue Mountain is, now, a part of the Orange East Supervisory Union.

== Notable people ==
- Alexander Dunnett, US Attorney for Vermont
- John Zampieri, member of the Vermont House of Representatives
