= Wells River (Vermont) =

River in Vermont, United States

Coordinates: 44.1542302°N 72.0470357°W

Physical characteristics
- Source: Ricker Pond
- Mouth: Connecticut River
- Discharge
  - location: Wells River
  - average: 154.6 cu ft/s (4.38 m^{3}/s)

The Wells River is a tributary of the Connecticut River, approximately 15 miles (24 km) long, located in the U.S. state of Vermont.

The Wells River begins at the outlet of Ricker Pond at the southern boundary of Groton State Forest in the town of Groton. The river flows generally southeast through the towns of Ryegate and Newbury before joining the Connecticut River at the village of Wells River. U.S. Route 302 follows the river for most of its length.

== See also ==
- List of rivers of Vermont
