= Groton (CDP), Vermont =

Census-designated place in Vermont, United States

Groton, Vermont
- Census-designated place
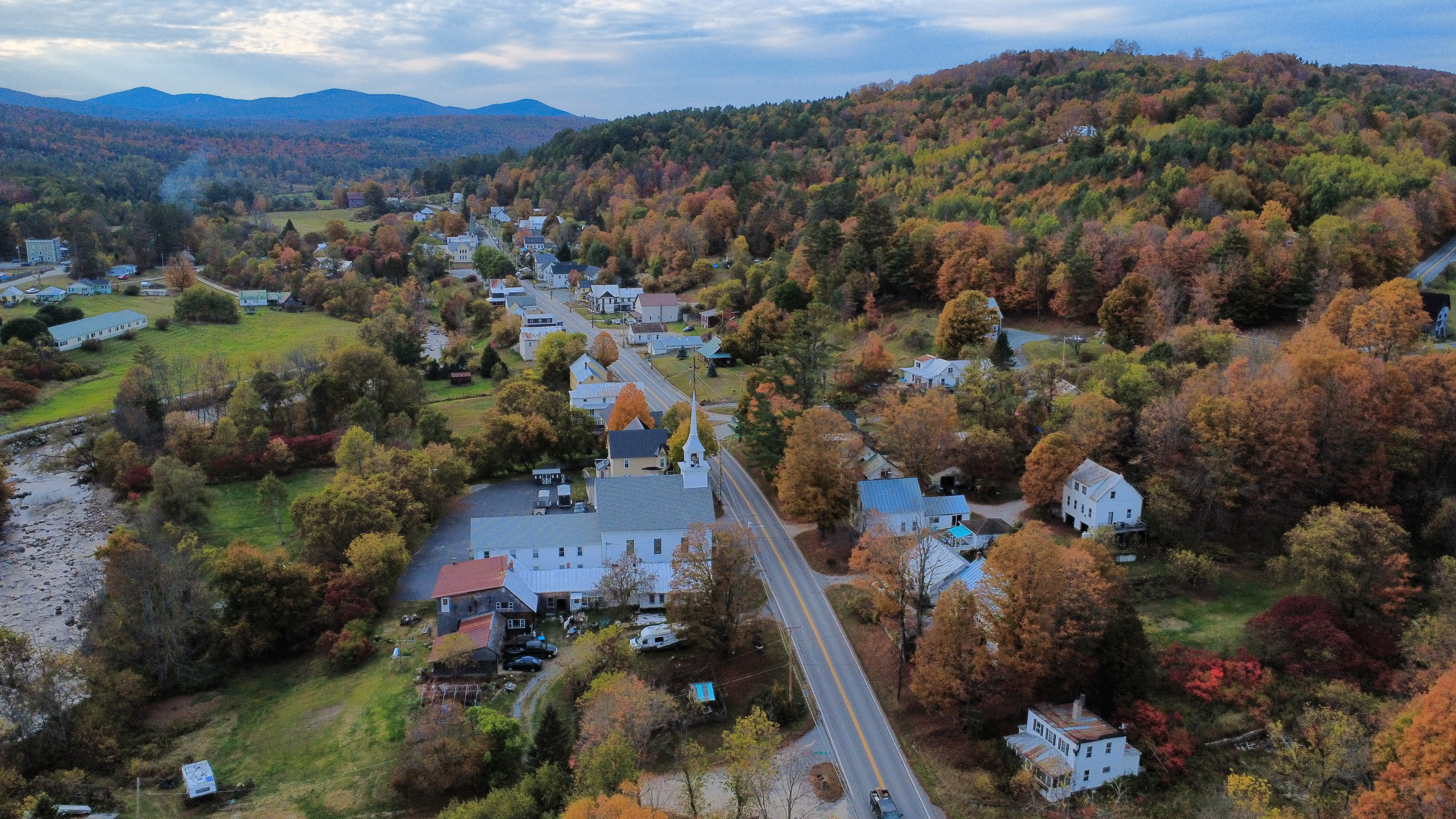
- Groton, VT, from the southeast

- Location within Vermont Location within the United States
- Coordinates: 44°12′52″N 72°11′52″W
- Country: United States
- State: Vermont
- County: Caledonia
- Town: Groton

Area
  - Total: 2.39 sq mi (6.18 km^{2})
  - Land: 2.36 sq mi (6.11 km^{2})
  - Water: 0.027 sq mi (0.07 km^{2})
- Elevation: 1,063 ft (324 m)

Population (2020)
  - Total: 419
- Time zone: UTC-5 (Eastern (EST))
  - Summer (DST): UTC-4 (EDT)
- ZIP Code: 05046
- Area code: 802
- FIPS code: 50-30475
- GNIS feature ID: 2586635

Groton is the primary village and a census-designated place (CDP) in the town of Groton, Caledonia County, Vermont, United States. As of the 2020 census, the CDP had a population of 419, out of 984 in the entire town of Groton.

Groton village is in southern Caledonia County, in the southeast corner of the town of Groton, along U.S. Route 302, which leads southeast 10 miles (16 km) to Wells River and southwest 20 miles (32 km) to Barre. The Wells River flows through the village, running southeast to the Connecticut River at the village of Wells River.
