= Big Deer State Park =

State park in Caledonia County, Vermont

- Location within Vermont
- Interactive map of Big Deer State Park
- Location: Groton, Vermont, United States
- Coordinates: 44.2872°N 72.2678°W
- Administrator: Vermont Department of Forests, Parks, and Recreation
- Open: Memorial Day weekend - Labor Day weekend
- Website: Official website
- Vermont State Parks

Big Deer State Park is a state park in Groton, Vermont. The park is a campground located in Groton State Forest close to the Groton Nature Center, Boulder Beach State Park and Stillwater State Park. The park features 21 tent/RV sites, 5 lean-tos, and a restroom with hot showers.
