= John Zampieri =

American politician (1941–2021)

Member of the Vermont House of Representatives
- In office 1965 – January 14, 1985
- Succeeded by: Richard Hausman
- Constituency: Caledonia County (1965–1967); 52nd district (1967–1973); Caledonia Orange 1st district (1973–1985)

Personal details
- Born: January 19, 1941 South Ryegate, Vermont, U.S.
- Died: June 7, 2021 (aged 80) Boston, Massachusetts, U.S.
- Party: Democratic
- Spouse: Joyce Hudson Andreoletti (m. 1969)
- Education: Champlain College

John Zampieri Jr. (January 19, 1941 – June 7, 2021) was an American politician who served in the Vermont House of Representatives from 1965 to 1985, as a member of the Democratic Party. Following his tenure in the state house he served as director of the Vermont Buildings Division.

Zampieri was born in South Ryegate, Vermont, and educated in Woodsville, New Hampshire, and graduated from Champlain College. He entered politics with his election to the state house and was the second youngest member at the time of his election and youngest after winning reelection.

During his tenure in the state house he served as chair of the Transportation and Institutions committees, with him being the only Democratic chair of a committee in the 51st session of the legislature. He considered running for Secretary of State and Lieutenant Governor, but declined both times. He was appointed to serve as director of the Vermont Buildings Division after unsuccessfully seeking the position of Speaker of the House.

== Early life ==
John Zampieri Jr. was born in South Ryegate, Vermont, on January 19, 1941, to John Zampieri. His parents were Italian and he held dual citizenship with Italy. He attended high school in Woodsville, New Hampshire. Zampieri's father served as cemetery commissioner and school director in Ryegate. He graduated from Champlain College. Zampieri worked in St. Petersburg, Florida for a few months before returning to Vermont in 1960. He served in the United States Air Force and trained at Lackland Air Force Base for three months. Zampieri married Joyce Hudson Andreoletti on June 21, 1969.

== Career ==
=== Politics ===
==== State ====
Zampieri endorsed Senator George Aiken, a member of the Republican Party, for reelection during the 1968 election. Zampieri was critical of former United States Representative William H. Meyer during the 1970 Senate election, and Zampieri stated that Meyer should be voted out of the Democratic Party and sent to the Liberty Union Party. During the 1974 election he served as the chair of Francis J. Esposito's congressional campaign committee.

Zampieri considered running for Secretary of State of Vermont in the 1974 election, but later declined to run, stating that his business responsibilities would prevent him from campaigning. Stuart St. Peter won the Democratic nomination for Secretary of State but was defeated by Republican nominee Richard C. Thomas.

Zampieri considered running for the Democratic nomination for Lieutenant Governor in the 1976 election and claimed that he had support from members of the state house and Vermont Senate, choosing to seek reelection to the state house instead. John Alden won the Democratic nomination and defeated Republican nominee T. Garry Buckley in the popular vote, but the state legislature selected Buckley to serve as Lieutenant Governor.

On October 16, 1979, he announced that he was considering running for Lieutenant Governor in the event that Lieutenant Governor Madeleine Kunin did not seek reelection, but he instead chose to seek reelection to the state house. Kunin won reelection as Lieutenant Governor in the 1980 election.

Zampieri ran for the position of vice-chair of the Vermont Democratic Party in 1975 to succeed retiring vice-chair Margaret Lucenti and won without opposition. He served as vice-chair until his resignation in 1977.

==== Presidential ====
During the 1968 Democratic presidential primaries, Zampieri served as a delegate for Hubert Humphrey to the Democratic National Convention. He stated that if President Lyndon B. Johnson attempted to gain the presidential nomination at the convention then Zampieri would vote for him based on who his running mate would be although he stated that if Johnson was nominated then Richard Nixon would win the presidential election. All of the Humphrey and George McGovern delegates except for Zampieri and John Fitzpatrick performed a walkout after a proposed plank opposing the Vietnam War failed. He was one of Vermont's nine delegates to support Humphrey while seven other delegates supported Eugene McCarthy and six others supported McGovern.

During the 1972 Democratic presidential primaries, he supported Edmund Muskie for the nomination stating that "Muskie can help us win in Vermont in 1972". Zampieri ran to serve as an uncommitted delegate to the Democratic National Convention as Muskie had dropped out of the election.

=== Vermont House of Representatives ===
==== Elections ====
In 1964, Zampieri won the Democratic nomination to run for a seat in the Vermont House of Representatives from Caledonia County and defeated Republican nominee Philip Nelson in the general election. He was given the Democratic nomination following reapportionment to run in the 52nd district in the 1966 election and defeated Republican nominee Charles Grant. He was reelected in the 1968 election. He was reelected in the 1970 election against Republican nominee James G. Thomas. He won reelection in the 1972 election. He was reelected in the 1974 and 1976 elections from the Caledonia Orange 1st district without opposition. He won reelection in the 1978 election. He defeated Republican nominee Russel C. Bullard in the 1980 election. He was reelected in the 1982 election. He faced no opposition in the 1984 election as he held both the Democratic and Republican nominations.

==== Tenure ====
Upon taking office Zampieri was the second youngest member of the state house as he was three months older than Representative James A. Field, but he became the youngest member of the state house following the 1966 election. Zampieri and Representative Brian D. Burns opposed William Hunter's, the chair of the Vermont Democratic Party, decision to not allow the public into the meeting of the executive committee in 1968.

Zampieri offered his resignation in 1979, which was to take effect on November 30, so that he could become executive vice-president of the Vermont Bankers Association, but later withdrew his resignation. He withdrew his resignation after working as executive vice-president for a short time and decided that he would rather want to be in the state house.

Zampieri served on the Joint Canvassing committee to certify the results of the 1964 elections. During his tenure in the state house he served as chair of the Transportation committee and as a member of the Natural Resources and Highways committees. He was the only Democrat to serve as a committee chair when Speaker Walter L. Kennedy appointed him as chair of the Institutions committee for the 51st session of the legislature in 1971. He was appointed to serve on the Democratic steering committee by Minority Leader Thomas Candon in 1973.

Before the 1984 election both Zampieri and Minority Leader Ralph G. Wright stated that they were interested in running for Speaker of the House. Zampieri announced that he would run for Speaker on November 9, but Wright defeated him when the Democratic Party voted 45 to 27 in favor of Wright.

=== Vermont Buildings Division ===
Irving Bates, the director of the Vermont Buildings Division, retired after serving eighteen years in the position in 1985. Governor Kunin appointed Zampieri to replace Bates as director, and he assumed office on January 14, 1985. Richard Hausman was appointed by Kunin on January 29 to fill the vacancy in the state house created by Zampieri becoming director. Governor Richard A. Snelling reappointed Zampieri as director. Renovations of the Vermont State House and Grand Isle County Courthouse were conducted during his tenure as director. He announced his retirement on April 2, 1997, due to ill health.

U.W. Marx Inc. filed a lawsuit against Zampieri and the John A. Russell Corporation claiming that John Russell Jr., the president of the Russell Corporation, contacted Zampieri to give the corporation a $3.5 million construction project. However, the lawsuit was thrown out of court twice.

== Later life ==
Zampieri's house was robbed in 1992, with around $10,000 worth of property being stolen. He was named as Citizen of the Year by the Vermont Freemasons in 2000. Zampieri died from heart failure at Tufts Medical Center in Boston, Massachusetts, on June 7, 2021.

== Political positions ==
The state house approved legislation, which was sponsored by Zampieri, showing sympathy to the three astronauts who died during Apollo 1. He introduced legislation in 1969 to congratulate the astronauts of Apollo 9. Zampieri opposed lowering the drinking age in Vermont from 21 to 18 and supported having able-bodied welfare recipients work.

== Electoral history ==
1964 Vermont House of Representatives Ryegate election
Party	Candidate	Votes	%
Democratic	John Zampieri	209	50.73%
Republican	Philip Nelson	203	49.27%
Total votes		412	100.00%

1966 Vermont House of Representatives Ryegate election
Party	Candidate	Votes	%	±%
Democratic	John Zampieri (incumbent)			
Independent	John Zampieri (incumbent)			
Total	John Zampieri (incumbent)	470	51.31%	+0.58%
Republican	Charles Grant	446	48.69%	−0.58%
Total votes		916	100.00%	

1970 Vermont House of Representatives Ryegate election
Party	Candidate	Votes	%
Democratic	John Zampieri (incumbent)	460	47.57%
Independent	John Zampieri (incumbent)	54	5.58%
Total	John Zampieri (incumbent)	514	53.15%
Republican	Charles Grant	453	46.85%
Total votes		967	100.00%

1980 Vermont House of Representatives Ryegate election
Party	Candidate	Votes	%
Democratic	John Zampieri (incumbent)	1,143	78.13%
Republican	Russell C. Bullard	320	21.87%
Total votes		1,463	100.00%
