= Boulder Beach State Park =

State park in Caledonia County, Vermont

- Location within Vermont
- Interactive map of Boulder Beach State Park
- Location: Groton, Vermont, United States
- Coordinates: 44°16′39″N 72°15′44″W
- Administrator: Vermont Department of Forests, Parks, and Recreation
- Open: Memorial Day weekend - Labor Day weekend
- Website: Official website
- Vermont State Parks

Boulder Beach State Park is a state park in Groton, Vermont located on the western shore of Lake Groton. The park is located in Groton State Forest close to the Groton Nature Center, Big Deer State Park and Stillwater State Park. The park features 75 shaded picnic sites with tables and hibachis. Rest rooms have lavatories and flush toilets. There is 200 feet of beach and swimming area, a cartop boat launch, play area, three large parking lots, and a concession stand. Canoes, kayaks and pedal boats are available to rent.
