= Alice Lord Goodine House =

Historic house in Vermont, United States

- U.S. National Register of Historic Places
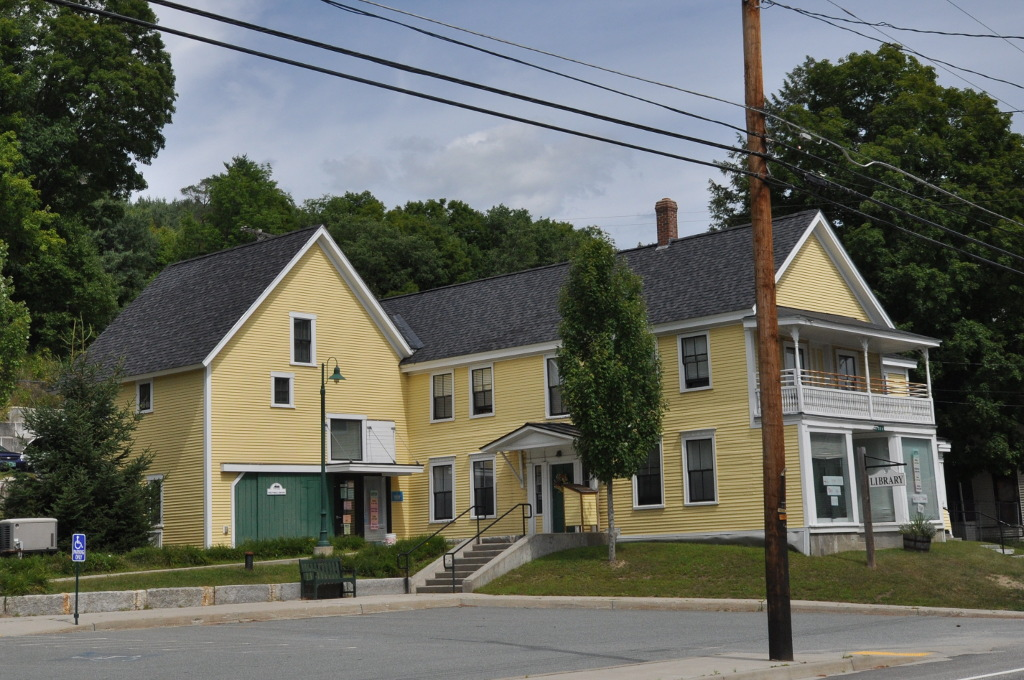

- Location within Vermont Location within the United States
- Location: 1304 Scott Highway, Groton, Vermont
- Coordinates: 44°12′37″N 72°11′40″W
- Area: 1 acre (0.40 ha)
- Built: 1840
- Architectural style: Greek Revival, Queen Anne
- NRHP reference No.: 04000441
- Added to NRHP: May 12, 2004

The Alice Lord Goodine House is a historic house at 1304 Scott Highway (United States Route 302) in Groton, Vermont. It presently houses the Groton Free Public Library. The building has a complex history, and is tied to the earliest settlement period of the village. It was listed on the National Register of Historic Places in 2004.

== Description and history ==
The Goodine House is located in the linear village center of Groton, on the north side of Scott Highway near its junction with Powder Spring Road. Scott Highway (US 302) is a major regional east–west route, connecting to Montpelier in the west and Littleton, New Hampshire in the east, and points beyond. The house is a 2 1/2-story wood-frame structure, with a gabled roof and attached carriage barn on the west side. Its traditional main entrance faces the street, but the current library entrance is located on the long western facade. The street facade has a commercial storefront on the ground floor, with rectangular display windows flanking a now-disused recessed entrance. Above this on the second floor is a hip-roofed porch with turned posts and balustrade in the Victorian style. The library entrance on the side has flanking sidelight windows, and is sheltered by a deep gabled hood, supported by simple angle brackets.

The building has a complex building history, originating in the construction of a single-story Cape style building that was attached to what is now known as the J.R. Darling Store, just to the west. It was operated as a tavern in that setting for many years, and also hosted town meetings for a time. In 1877 it was acquired by businessman J.R. Darling. He separated the two buildings, moving the tavern to this site, raising it, and building a new first floor underneath it. At this time it was described as serving as an inn, with the innkeeper living on site. The street-facing commercial storefront is probably an early 20th-century addition. In 1930 it was acquired by Etta M. Wilds Lord, mother of Alice Lord Goodine. The Lords were locally prominent; father Charles was the owner of a local newspaper. The Goodines were also prominent in the life of the community: Alice was a schoolteacher and gave music lessons, while Henry was a barber and operated a local diner. Alice Goodine died in 1998.

== See also ==
- National Register of Historic Places listings in Caledonia County, Vermont
