= Whitehill House =

Historic house in Vermont, United States

- U.S. National Register of Historic Places
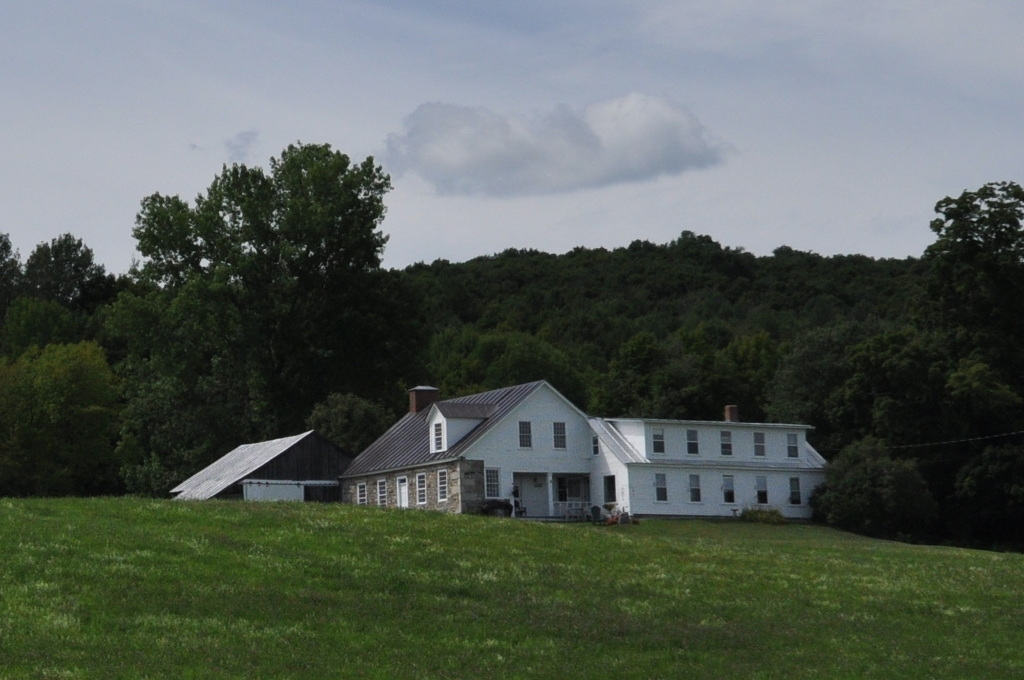

- Location within Vermont Location within the United States
- Location: Groton-Peacham Rd., Ryegate, Vermont
- Coordinates: 44°15′55″N 72°10′27″W
- Area: 1 acre (0.40 ha)
- Built: 1808
- Built by: Whitehill, James
- Architectural style: Federal
- NRHP reference No.: 75000138
- Added to NRHP: May 30, 1975

The Whitehill House is a historic house on Groton-Peacham Road in Ryegate, Vermont. Built in 1808, it is the oldest surviving building in Ryegate, and a distinctive example of stonework by Scottish immigrants. It was listed on the National Register of Historic Places in 1975.

== Description and history ==
The Whitehill House stands in a rural area of northwestern Ryegate, set back about 450 feet (140 m) on the west side of the Groton-Peacham Road. Its main block is 1 1/2 stories in height, with a broad gabled roof oriented with the gable to the street and the main facade to the south. A wood-frame ell extends north from the northeast corner, and a barn extends west from the southwest corner. The main block is built out of roughly coursed granite, with wood-frame gables above. The main facade is five bays wide, with a center entrance. The interior follows a typical center hall plan, but has little of its original finishes. A massive stone chimney is located at the western end.

The house was built in 1808 by James Whitehill, an immigrant from Inchinnan, Renfrewshire, who arrived in Ryegate in 1798. Whitehill was one of a large number of Scottish immigrants to the region, and was one of the founders of the local Presbyterian church. The house remained in the hands of descendants of Whitehill until 1928, when it was transferred to a family association.

== See also ==
- National Register of Historic Places listings in Caledonia County, Vermont
