= East Ryegate, Vermont =

- Village
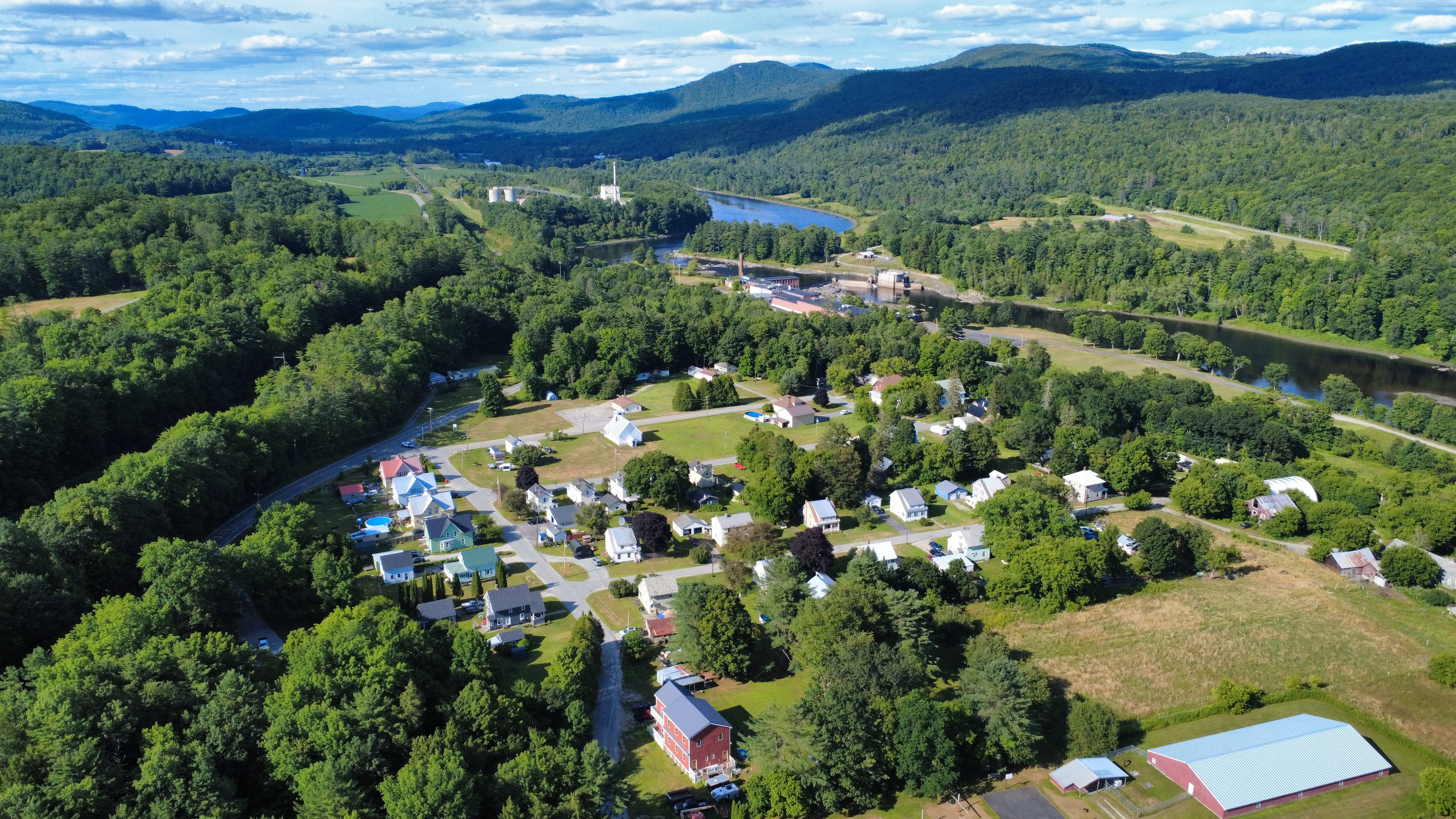
- View of East Ryegate, VT, from the south

- Location within Vermont
- Coordinates: 44°12′18″N 72°03′40″W
- Country: United States
- State: Vermont
- County: Caledonia
- Elevation: 489 ft (149 m)
- Time zone: UTC-5 (Eastern (EST))
  - Summer (DST): UTC-4 (EDT)
- ZIP code: 05042
- Area code: 802
- GNIS feature ID: 1457318

East Ryegate is an unincorporated village in the town of Ryegate, Caledonia County, Vermont, United States. The community is located along the Connecticut River and U.S. Route 5 15 miles (24 km) south of St. Johnsbury. East Ryegate has a post office with ZIP code 05042.
