= Ricker Pond State Park =

State park in Caledonia County, Vermont

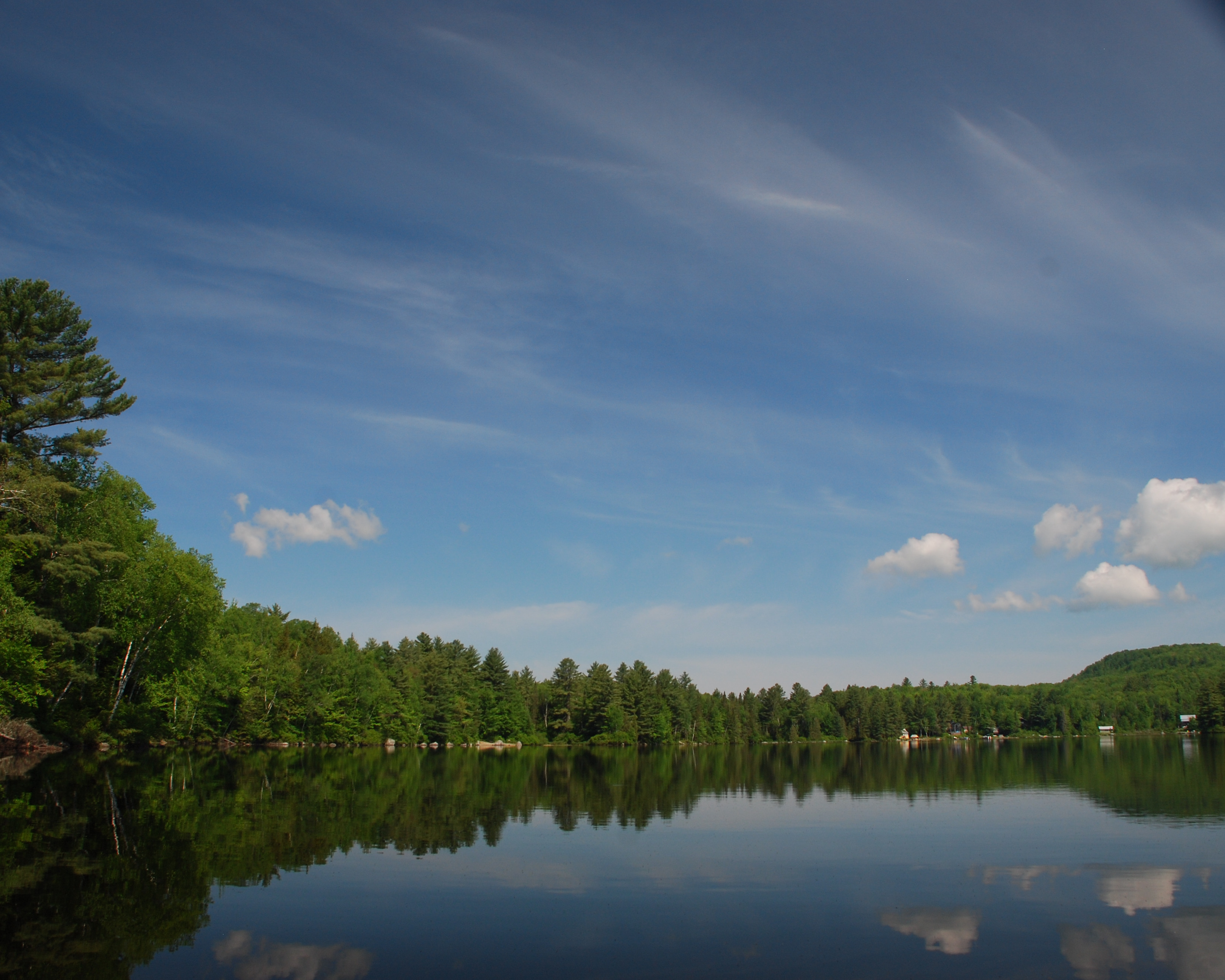
- Ricker Pond
- Interactive map of Ricker Pond State Park
- Type: State park
- Location: 18 Ricker Pond Campground Rd. Groton, Vermont
- Operator: Vermont Department of Forests, Parks, and Recreation
- Status: Memorial Day weekend - Columbus Day weekend
- Website: https://vtstateparks.com/ricker.html
- Ricker Pond State Park
- U.S. National Register of Historic Places
- U.S. Historic district
- Location within Vermont Location within the United States
- Location: 526 State Forest Rd., Groton, Vermont
- Coordinates: 44.246°N 72.254°W
- Area: 50 acres (20 ha)
- Built: 1938
- Built by: CCC
- Architectural style: CCC state park
- MPS: Historic Park Landscapes in National and State Parks MPS
- NRHP reference No.: 02000277
- Added to NRHP: March 29, 2002

Ricker Pond State Park is a state park in Groton, Vermont in the United States. It is one of seven state parks located in Groton State Forest. The park is just off Vermont Route 232. The park provides public access to Ricker Pond, a 95-acre (38 ha) lake in central Groton, and was developed in the 1930s by crews of the Civilian Conservation Corps. Activities includes camping, motor boating, waterskiing, fishing, swimming, paddling, horseback riding, hiking, mountain biking, snowshoeing and cross-country skiing. The park is open between the Memorial Day and Columbus Day weekends; fees are charged for day use and camping.

== Features ==
Ricker Pond State Park is located near the geographic center of the town of Groton, on the east side of Groton State Forest, the state's second largest state forest. Ricker Pond is a roughly teardrop-shaped body of water with its outlet at the southeastern end. Vermont Route 232 runs roughly westward past the southeastern end, creating a triangular wedge of land between it and the southern shore of the pond. The park facilities are located in that area. The park entrance is at the western end of the park, with stone-posted gate and gatehouse, and CCC-built rangers' quarters nearby. Gravel roads provide access to three separate areas of the waterfront. Section A, the westernmost, has a loop of leanto camp sites and a boat launch. Section B is a tent camping area, and includes a 1938 CCC-built picnic pavilion and a sandy beach area. Section C, at the eastern end of the park, provides tent and trailer camping, and includes a small cabin that is available for rent.

In addition to the water-based facilities, the park provides access to the trail networks of the surrounding state forest. The Montpelier-Wells River Rail Trail (Cross Vermont Trail) runs through the middle of the park.

== History ==
The outlet of Ricker Pond was the site of one of the first industrial sites in Groton, when Edmund Morse, one of the town's first settlers, built a sawmill and gristmill there in 1783. He sold the mills to Amaziah Ricker in 1827, and they remained in operation by the Ricker family until 1963. Construction of the railroad through the valley in the mid-19th century helped draw tourists to the area's scenic beauty. The state began purchasing land around Ricker Pond in 1919. The park was formally opened in 1933, its early facilities developed by crews of the Civilian Conservation Corps, a Depression-era jobs program. Surviving elements built by the CCC include the basic road network, the central picnic pavilion and beach, the ranger quarters, and a number of surviving stone fireplaces. The park was listed on the National Register of Historic Places in 2002 in recognition of the historical significance of these elements.

== See also ==
- National Register of Historic Places listings in Caledonia County, Vermont
