= Seyon Lodge State Park =

State park in Caledonia County, Vermont

- Interactive map of Seyon Lodge State Park
- Type: State park
- Location: 2967 Seyon Pond Road; Groton, Vermont
- Coordinates: 44.227°N 72.304°W
- Operator: Vermont Department of Forests, Parks, and Recreation
- Website: https://vtstateparks.com/seyon.html

Seyon Lodge State Park is a state park near Groton, Vermont in the United States. It is one of seven state parks located in Groton State Forest.

The focus of Seyon Lodge State Park is the 39-acre Noyes Pond. Activities includes bicycling, fly fishing, hiking, picnicking, snowshoeing and cross-country skiing.

The Lodge at Seyon operates year-round and features private lodging, event and meeting facilities for individual guests and groups.
