= Wells River Graded School =

- Well River Graded School
- U.S. National Register of Historic Places
- U.S. Historic district – Contributing property
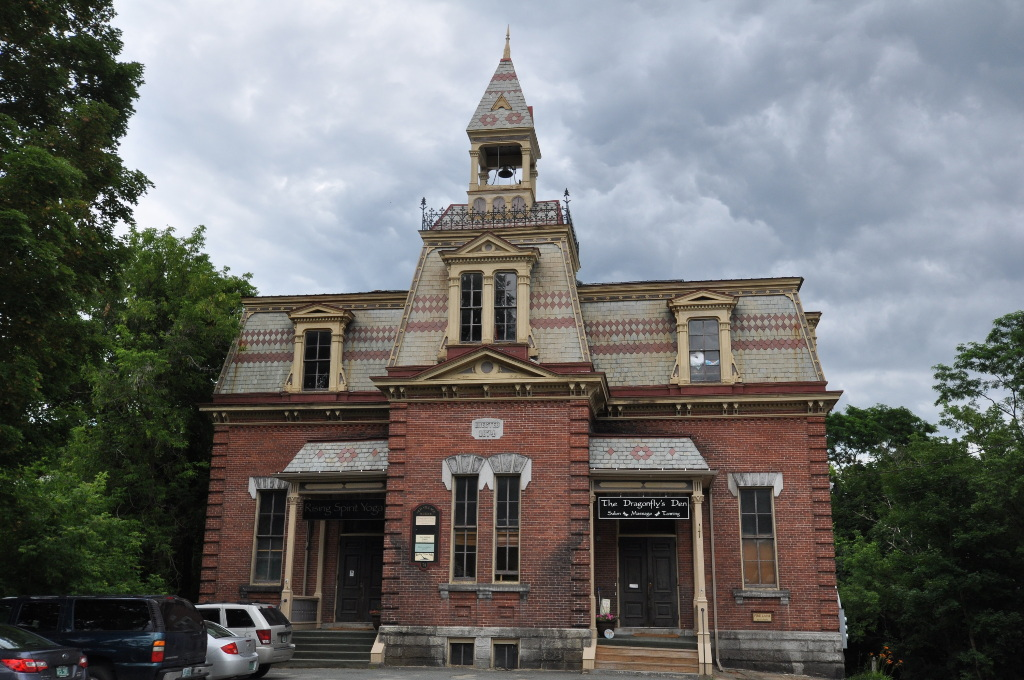

- Location within Vermont Location within the United States
- Location: Main St., Wells River, Vermont
- Coordinates: 44°9′6″N 72°2′44″W
- Area: less than one acre
- Built: 1874
- Architect: possibly Lambert Packard
- Architectural style: Second Empire
- Part of: Wells River Village Historic District (ID83003217)
- NRHP reference No.: 76000142

Significant dates
- Added to NRHP: September 3, 1976
- Designated CP: July 28, 1983

The Wells River Graded School is a historic school building on United States Route 5 in the Wells River village of Newbury, Vermont. Built in 1874, it is one of the state's finest examples of Second Empire architecture. Now in commercial use, it was listed on the National Register of Historic Places in 1976.

== Description and history ==
The former Wells River Graded School building stands set back from Main Street (US 5) on the south side of the village of Wells River, adjacent to the Wells River Congregational Church. It is a 1-1/2 story brick building, with a mansard roof providing a full second story. A tower-like section projects from the center of the front facade, also two stories tall, its roof crested by an iron railing and capped by an open belfry with pyramidal roof. Both the main roof and belfry roof are composed of multicolored slate shingles. The building corners are quoined in brick, and the eaves are studded with paired Italianate brackets. Entrances are set flanking the central projecting, under hip-roof porches, also with multicolor slate roofs. The interior plan has two classrooms on each floor, with separate stairwells in the two western corners.

The school was built in 1874. Although its architect is not documented, the building is stylistically similar to others designed by Lambert Packard in St. Johnsbury. The building was adapted to commercial and community uses in the mid-1970s.

== July 2022 building fire ==
On July 18, 2022, while undergoing restoration work by a private owner, the building was severely damaged by fire causing collapse of the roof and upper floors. As of 2023, the building remains in ruin, with no certainty of any future attempt at restoration.

== See also ==
- National Register of Historic Places listings in Orange County, Vermont
