= Groton, Vermont =

- Town
- Groton, VT, from the west

- Logo

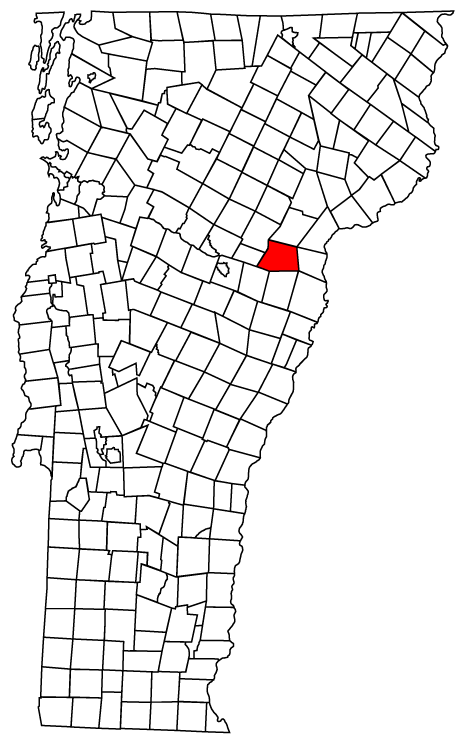
- Groton, Vermont
- Coordinates: 44°14′34″N 72°14′20″W
- Country: United States
- State: Vermont
- County: Caledonia
- Communities: Groton; Ricker Mills; West Groton

Area
  - Total: 55.0 sq mi (142.4 km^{2})
  - Land: 53.7 sq mi (139.2 km^{2})
  - Water: 1.2 sq mi (3.1 km^{2})
- Elevation: 1,427 ft (435 m)

Population (2020)
  - Total: 984
  - Density: 18/sq mi (7.1/km^{2})
- Time zone: UTC-5 (Eastern (EST))
  - Summer (DST): UTC-4 (EDT)
- ZIP code: 05046
- Area code: 802
- FIPS code: 50-30550
- GNIS feature ID: 1462110
- Website: www.grotonvt.com

Groton is a town in Caledonia County, Vermont, United States. The population was 984 at the 2020 census. It contains the places Groton Pond, Rickers Mills, Rickers and West Groton. The unincorporated village of Groton in the southeast corner of town is recorded as the Groton census-designated place (CDP), with a population of 419 at the 2020 census.

== History ==
Some say the town was named after Groton, Massachusetts, while others believe it was named after Groton, Connecticut.

== Geography ==
Groton, Vermont

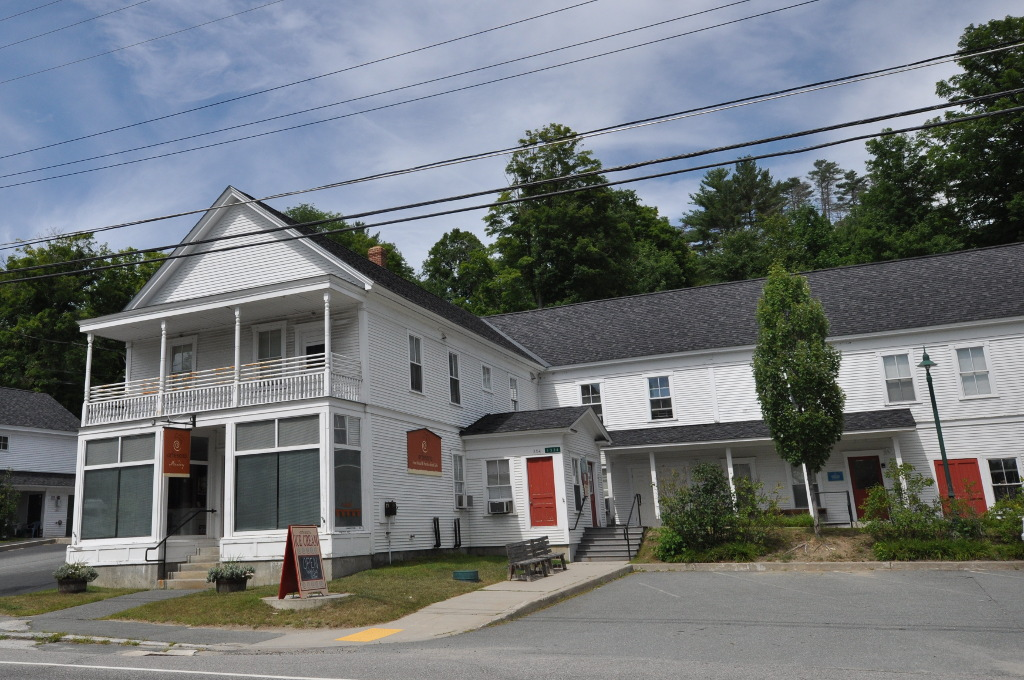
J. R. Darling Store

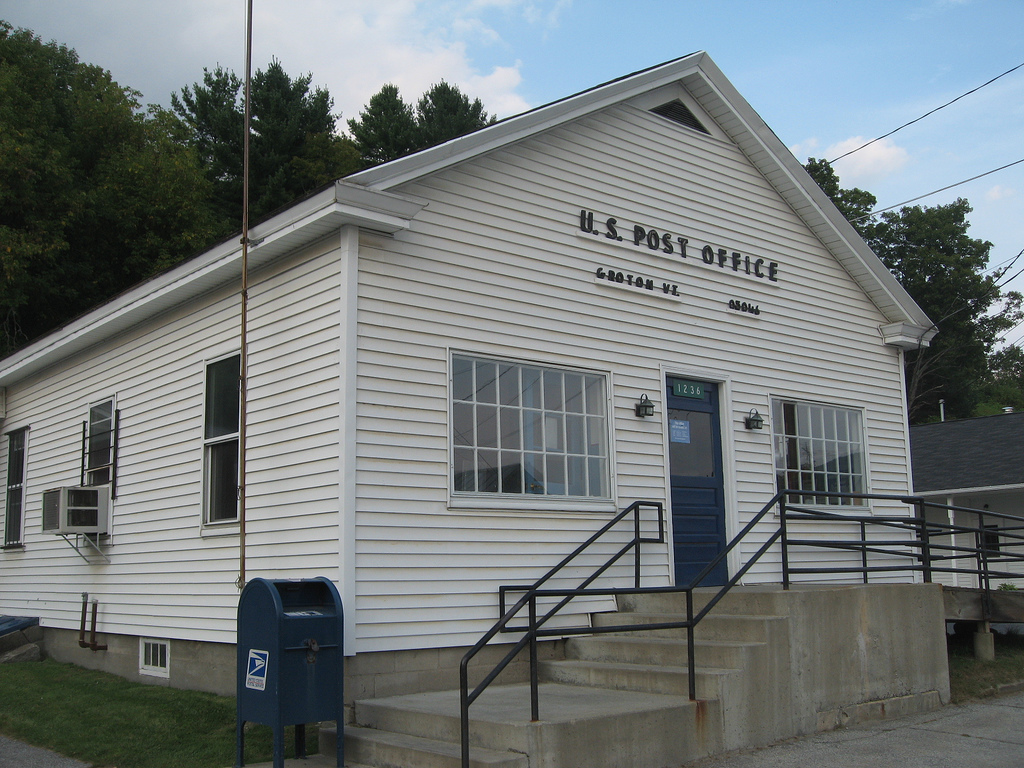
Post Office

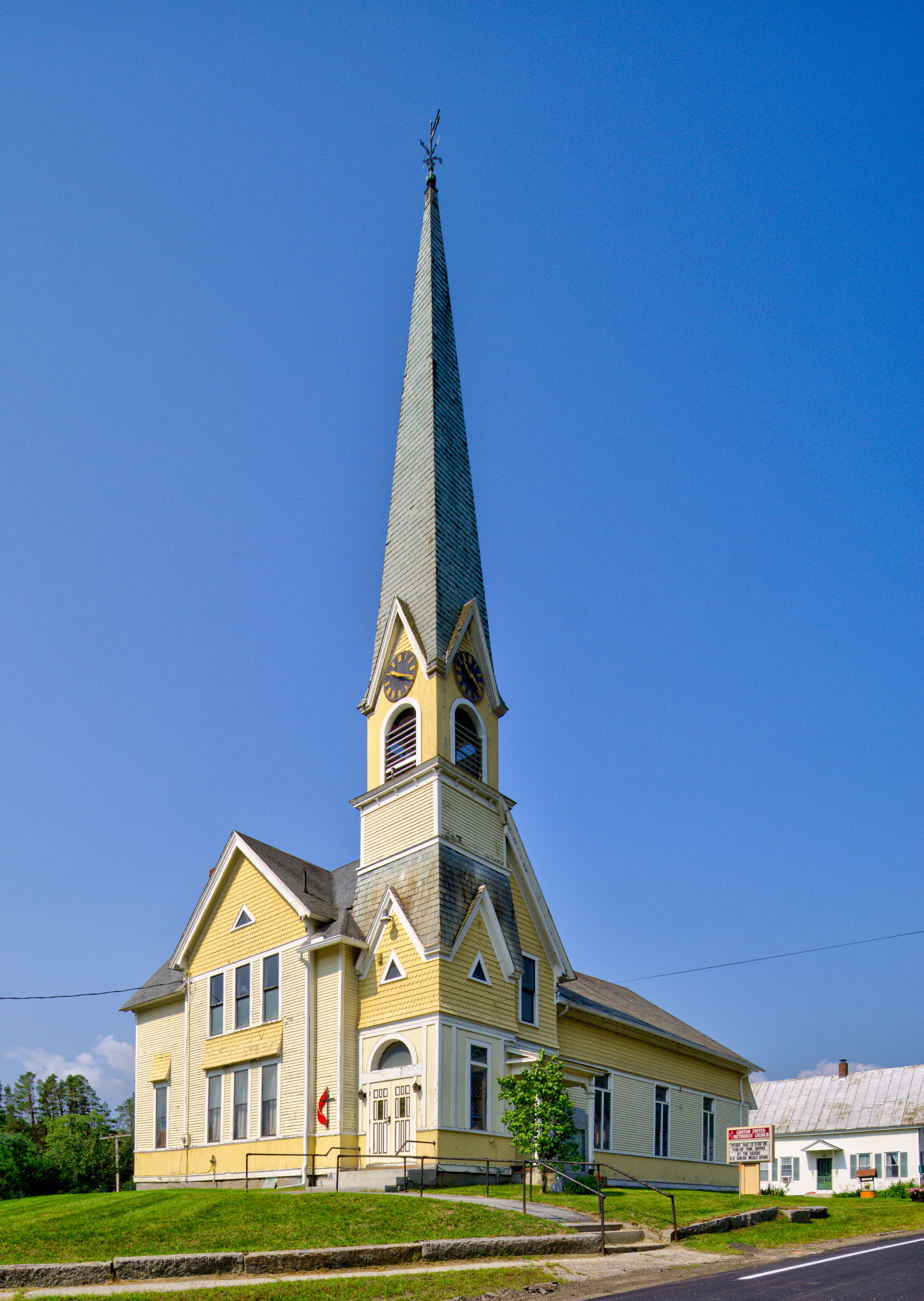
Methodist Church

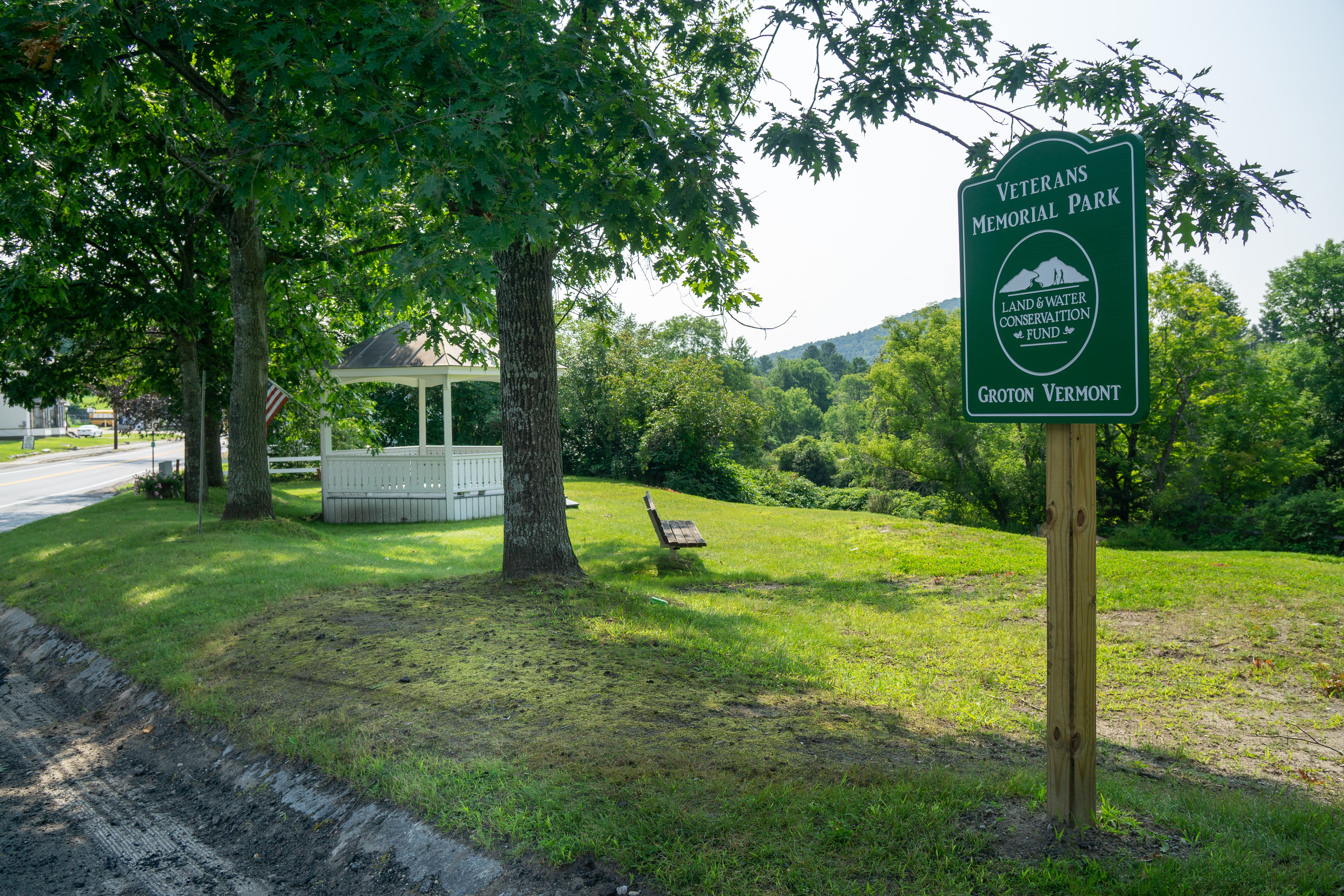
Town Park

Groton is located in the southwest corner of Caledonia County. It is bordered by the town of Peacham to the north, Barnet to the northeast, and Ryegate to the east, all in Caledonia County. To the south, in Orange County, are the towns of Newbury (southeast), Topsham (south), and Orange (southwest). The Washington County towns of Plainfield and Marshfield are to the west. According to the United States Census Bureau, the town has a total area of 142.4 square kilometres (55.0 sq mi), of which 139.2 square kilometres (53.7 sq mi) is land and 1.2 square miles (3.1 km^{2}), or 2.19%, is water.

The Wells River, a tributary of the Connecticut River, has its headwaters in Groton. Groton State Forest occupies most of the western third of the town. The highest point in Groton is 3,352-foot (1,022 m) Signal Mountain, near the southwest corner of the town.

The CDP of Groton is the primary settlement in the town, located in the southeastern corner along US 302 and the Wells River. It has a total area of 2.07 square miles (5.36 km^{2}), of which 2.05 square miles (5.31 km^{2}) is land and 0.023 square miles (0.06 km^{2}), or 1.03%, is water.

== Demographics ==
Historical population
Census	Pop.	Note	%±
1790	45		—
1800	248		451.1%
1810	449		81.0%
1820	595		32.5%
1830	836		40.5%
1840	928		11.0%
1850	895		−3.6%
1860	939		4.9%
1870	811		−13.6%
1880	1,014		25.0%
1890	1,040		2.6%
1900	1,059		1.8%
1910	915		−13.6%
1920	902		−1.4%
1930	803		−11.0%
1940	764		−4.9%
1950	712		−6.8%
1960	631		−11.4%
1970	666		5.5%
1980	667		0.2%
1990	862		29.2%
2000	876		1.6%
2010	1,022		16.7%
2020	984		−3.7%
U.S. Decennial Census

As of the census of 2000, there were 876 people, 338 households, and 252 families residing in the town. The population density was 16.2 people per square mile (6.3/km^{2}). There were 586 housing units at an average density of 10.9 per square mile (4.2/km^{2}). The racial makeup of the town was 96.46% White, 1.26% Native American, 0.23% from other races, and 2.05% from two or more races. Hispanic or Latino of any race were 0.34% of the population.

There were 338 households, out of which 35.8% had children under the age of 18 living with them, 61.8% were couples living together and joined in either marriage or civil union, 9.5% had a female householder with no husband present, and 25.4% were non-families. 20.1% of all households were made up of individuals, and 9.8% had someone living alone who was 65 years of age or older. The average household size was 2.59 and the average family size was 2.99.

In the town, the population was spread out, with 28.3% under the age of 18, 5.4% from 18 to 24, 25.8% from 25 to 44, 25.9% from 45 to 64, and 14.6% who were 65 years of age or older. The median age was 39 years. For every 100 females, there were 86.4 males. For every 100 females age 18 and over, there were 86.9 males.

The median income for a household in the town was $33,333, and the median income for a family was $36,719. Males had a median income of $28,750 versus $18,269 for females. The per capita income for the town was $14,659. Below the poverty line were 10.5% of people, 6.8% of families, 11.9% of those under 18 and 9.1% of those over 64.

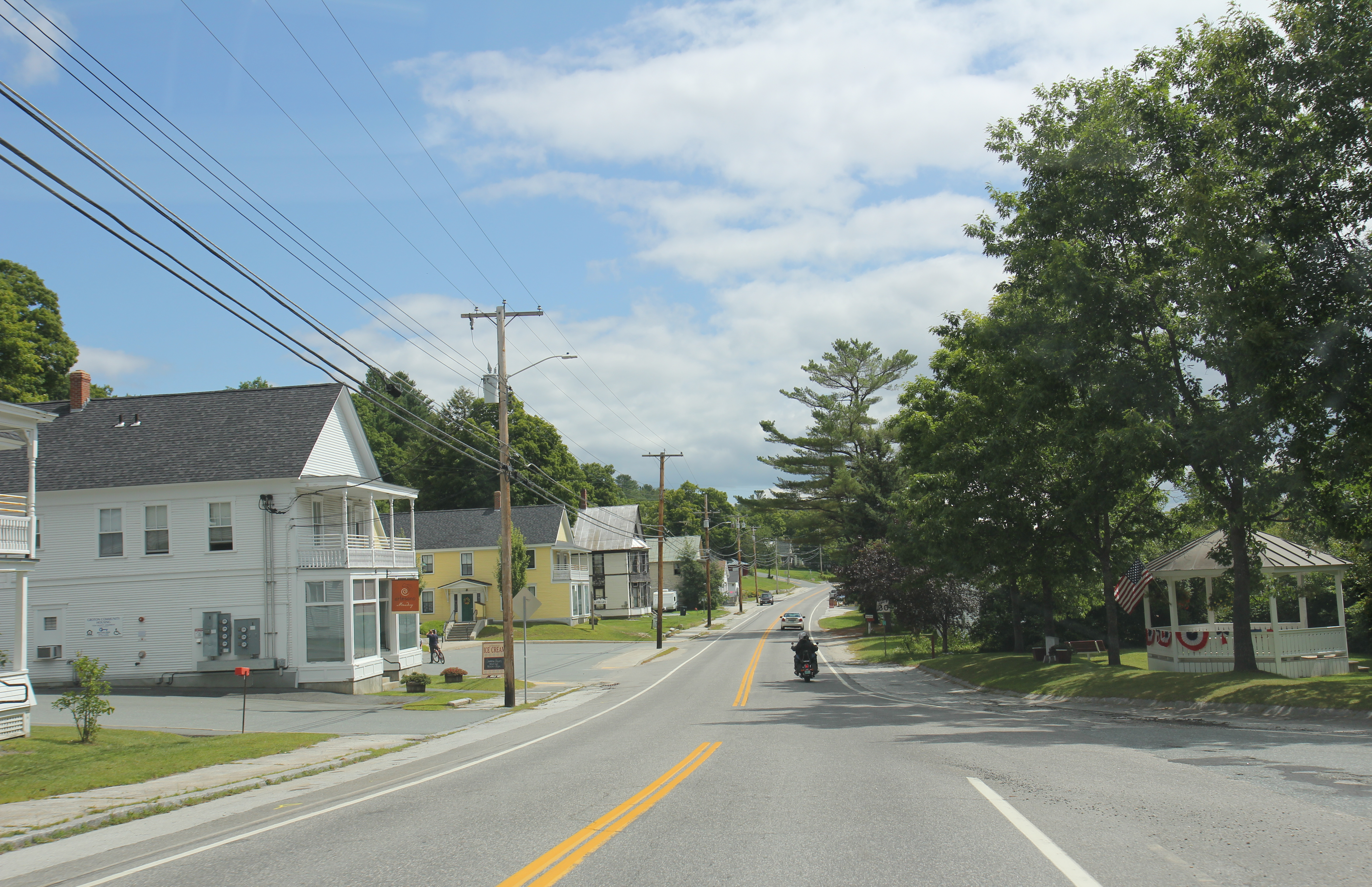
lGroton on US302

== Infrastructure ==
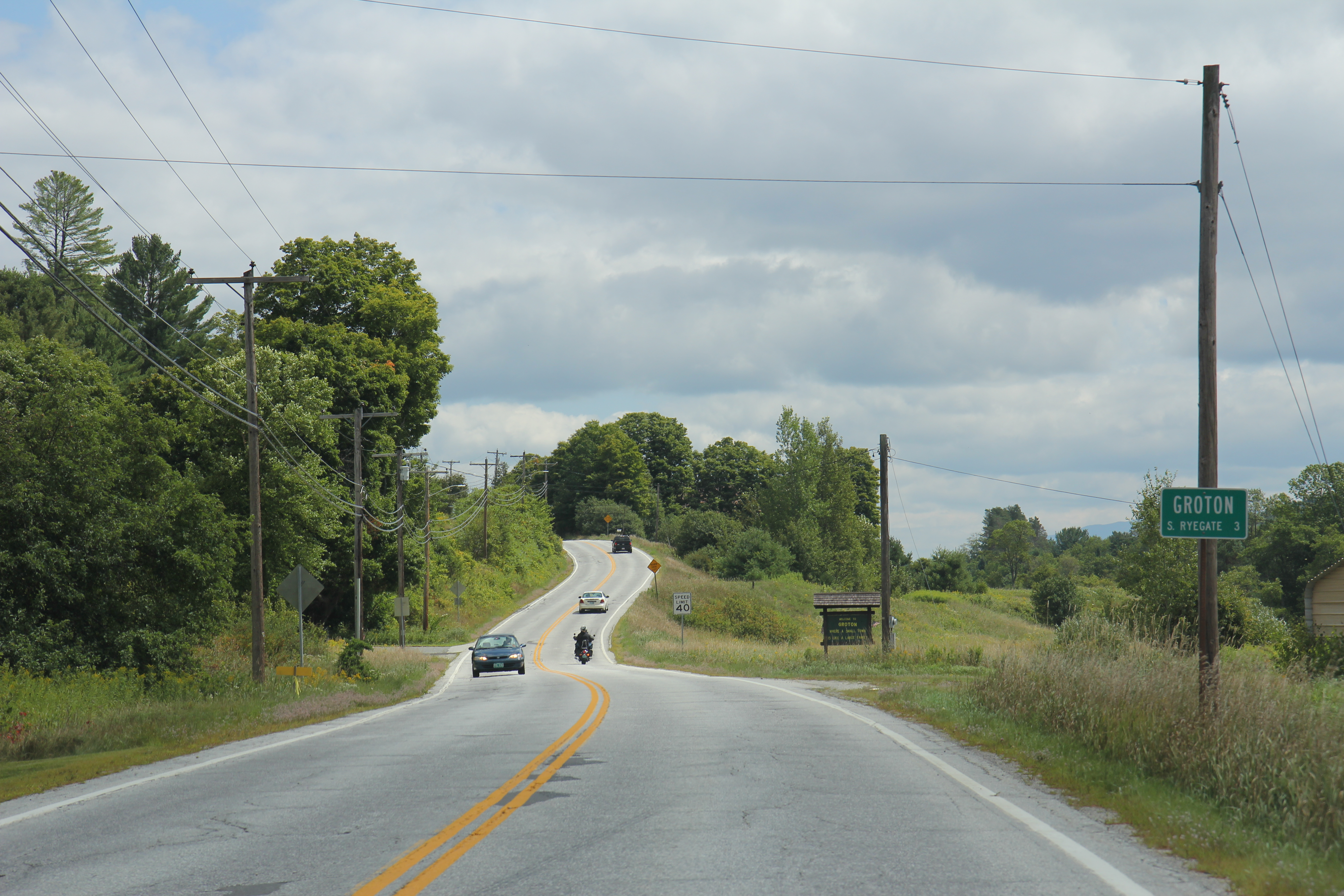
The sign for Groton on US302

- U.S. Route 302 passes through the southern part of the town, leading east Wells River, Vermont, and Woodsville, New Hampshire, and west to Barre and Montpelier.
- Vermont Route 232 leads north from US-302 through Groton State Forest to Marshfield.

== Recreation ==
Groton is home to five state parks in Groton State Forest: Big Deer State Park, Boulder Beach State Park, Ricker Pond State Park, Seyon Lodge State Park and Stillwater State Park, as well as the Groton Nature Center. Activities in the parks include hiking, camping, fishing, swimming, boating, picnicking, snowshoeing and cross country skiing.

The Groton Fall Festival and the Fall Foliage Chicken Pie are annual traditions.

== Notable people ==
- Bristol Bill, infamous burglar and counterfeiter, lived in Groton and was captured there after a multi-year crime spree
- William Scott, Civil War soldier pardoned by Abraham Lincoln; known as "The Sleeping Sentinel" was born in Groton
