= Vermont Route 232 =

State highway in Vermont, US

Vermont Route 232
- VT 232 highlighted in red

Route information
- Maintained by VTrans
- Length: 13.548 mi (21.803 km)
- Existed: 1957–present

Major junctions
- South end: US 302 in Groton
- North end: US 2 in Marshfield

Location
- Country: United States
- State: Vermont
- Counties: Caledonia, Washington

Highway system
- State highways in Vermont
← VT 225	→ VT 235

Vermont Route 232 (VT 232) is a 13.548-mile-long (21.803 km) state highway located in Caledonia and Washington counties, Vermont, United States. The route begins at a junction with U.S. Route 302 (US 302) in the town of Groton and runs north to a junction with US 2 in the town of Marshfield. The route does not junction with any other state highways, but serves as the main road for Lake Groton. VT 232 was first designated in 1957.

== Route description ==
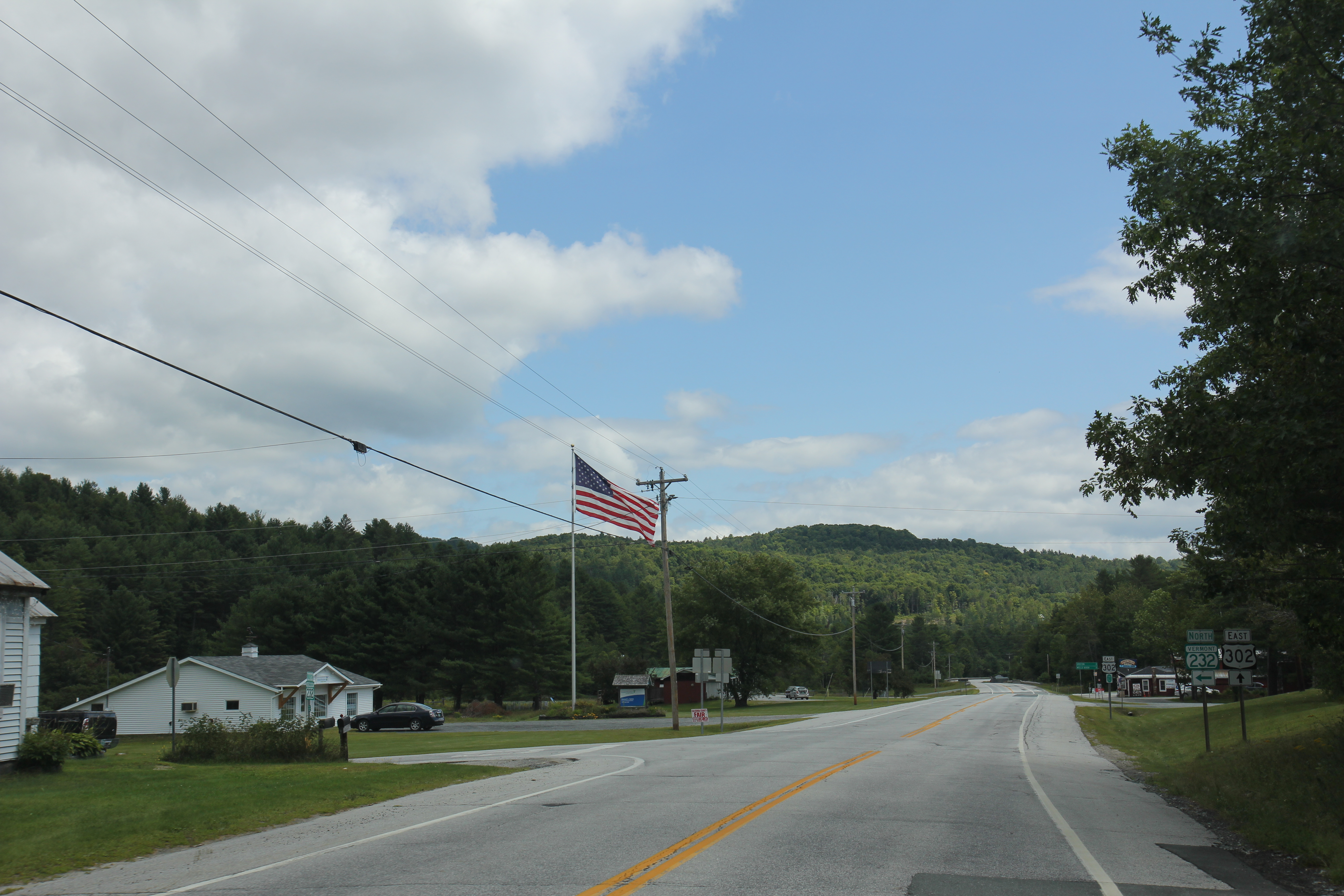
Southern terminus at U.S. Route 302

VT 232 begins at a junction with US 302 (Scott Highway) in the Caledonia County town of Groton at the shores of the south branch of the Wells River. VT 232 runs northwest through Groton as a two-lane road along the main stretch of the Wells River, crossing through dense woods along the riverside. At the junction with South County Road, the route reaches the southern end of Ricker Pond, where it turns further to the northwest. Running well south of the shore of Ricker Pond, the route crosses an access point to Ricker Pond Campground. Soon Ricker Pond gives way to Lake Groton, which is connected to lakeside homes via Lakeside Drive. VT 232 runs north along the woods overlooking Lake Groton, passing the western shore from the hills above. By the junction with Boulder Beach Road, the route turns further northwest through Groton and away from the lake.

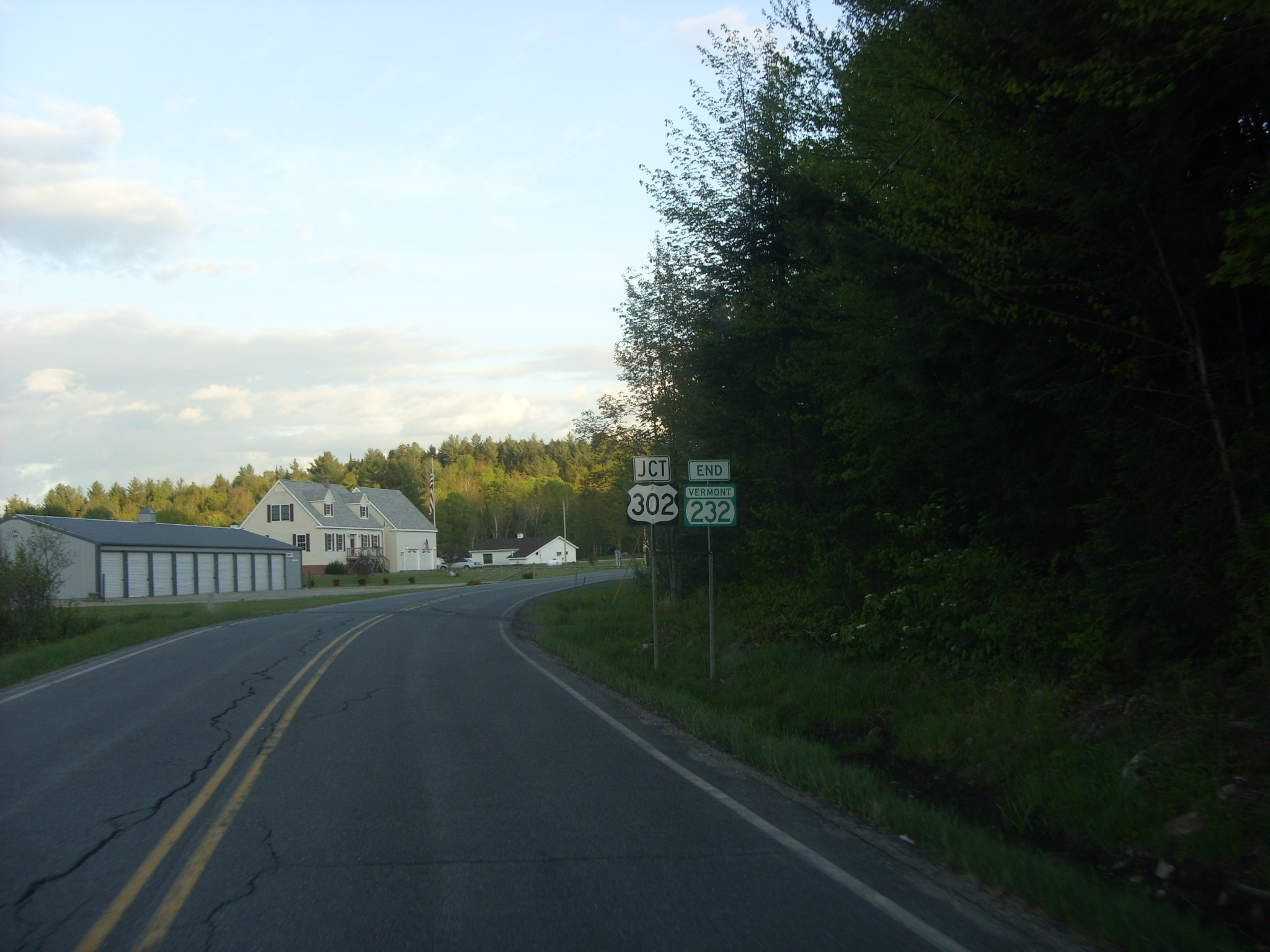
VT 232 southbound approaching US 302 in Groton

The route winds northwestward through the dense woods, turning northeast for a jog past another nearby pond. VT 232 crosses over a former railroad right-of-way and enters the town of Peacham. Passing Goslant Pond, the route turns north and reaches the Washington County line. Running along the county line, VT 232 runs through the town of Marshfield once it enters Washington County fully. At the junction with New Discovery Road, this occurs, entering the hamlet of Lanesboro and soon, the route makes a large curve from the northeast to the northwest, passing a junction with Peacham Pond Road. Reaching the area of Mollys Falls Pond, VT 232 runs northwest through Marshfield, crossing through the fields and flat lands of the town, crossing into the town of Cabot for a short distance.

Soon, the route crosses back into the town of Marshfield, paralleling and soon intersecting with US 2 (Theodore Roosevelt Highway). This junction marks the northern terminus of VT 232, just east of the junction with VT 215.

== History ==
VT 232 was formerly known as the Groton–Marshfield State Highway, a state-maintained highway. In 1957, by an act of the Vermont State Legislature, the route received the VT 232 designation.

== Major intersections ==
County	Location	mi	km	Destinations	Notes
Caledonia	Groton	0.000	0.000	US 302 (Scott Highway) – Groton, Wells River, Barre	Southern terminus
Washington	Marshfield	13.548	21.803	US 2 (Theodore Roosevelt Highway) – Marshfield, Montpelier, Danville, St. Johnsbury	Northern terminus
1.000 mi = 1.609 km; 1.000 km = 0.621 mi
