= Wells River, Vermont =

- Village
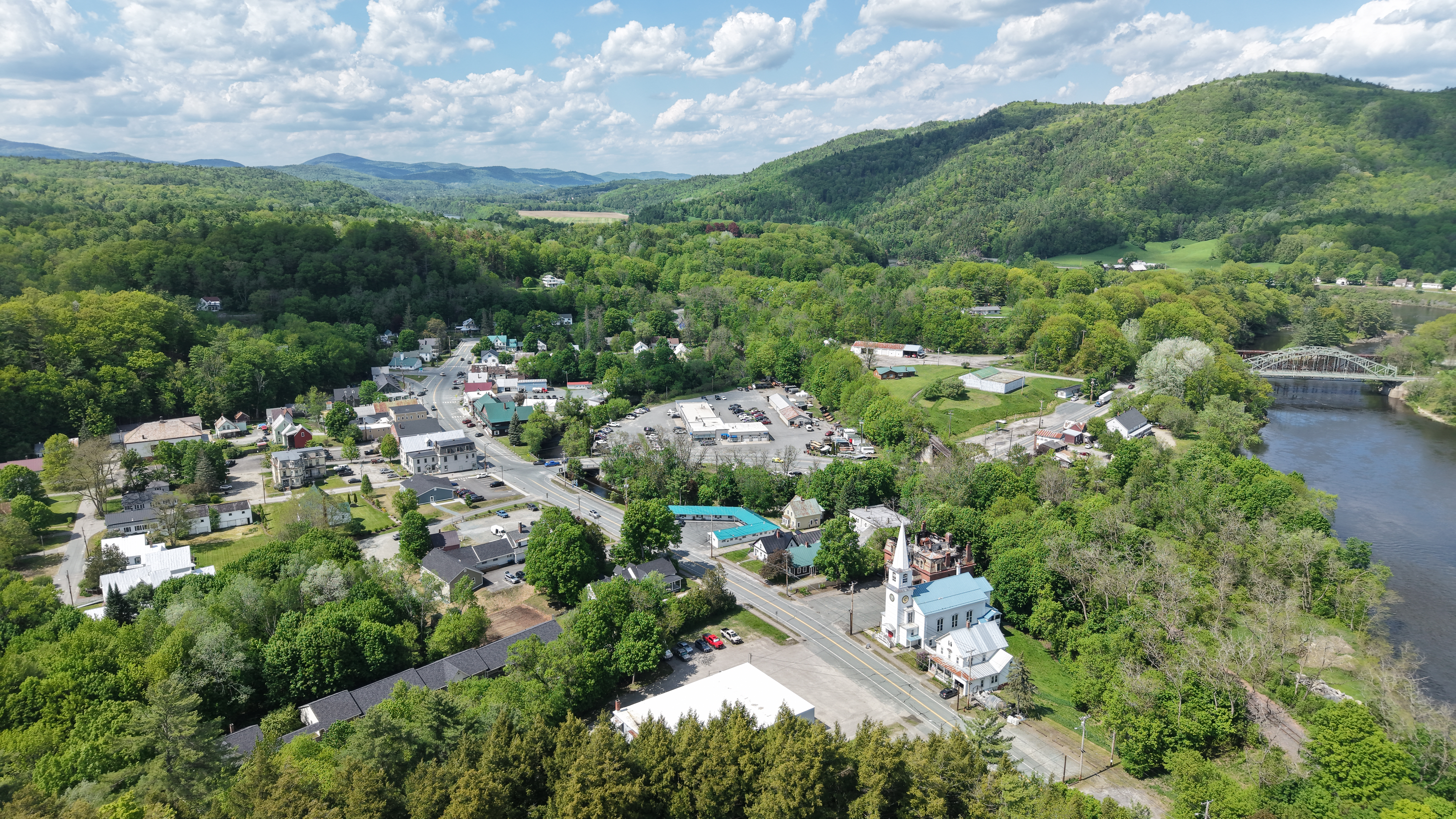
- Wells River, Vermont, from the south

- Location within the state of Vermont Wells River (the United States)
- Coordinates: 44°09′13″N 72°03′42″W
- Country: United States
- State: Vermont
- County: Orange

Area
  - Total: 1.92 sq mi (4.96 km^{2})
  - Land: 1.88 sq mi (4.86 km^{2})
  - Water: 0.039 sq mi (0.10 km^{2})
- Elevation: 738 ft (225 m)

Population (2020)
  - Total: 431
  - Density: 230/sq mi (88.7/km^{2})
- Time zone: UTC-5 (Eastern (EST))
  - Summer (DST): UTC-4 (EDT)
- ZIP code: 05081
- Area code: 802
- FIPS code: 50-78025
- GNIS feature ID: 2378330
- Website: wellsrivervillage.org
- Wells River Village Historic District
- U.S. National Register of Historic Places
- U.S. Historic district
- Location: Main, Center, Grove, Cross, and Water Sts., Newbury, Vermont
- Area: 39 acres (15.8 ha)
- Architectural style: Classical Revival, Other, Federal, Late Victorian
- NRHP reference No.: 83003217
- Added to NRHP: July 28, 1983

Wells River is a village in the town of Newbury in Orange County, Vermont, United States. The population was 431 at the 2020 census. The village center is located at the junction of U.S. Routes 5 and 302.

The village center (the portion near the confluence of the Wells River and the Connecticut River) was added to the National Register of Historic Places in 1983 as Wells River Village Historic District. The district covers 84 contributing properties over an area of 390 acres (1.6 km^{2}). It includes examples of Classical Revival, Federal, and Late Victorian styles.

== History ==
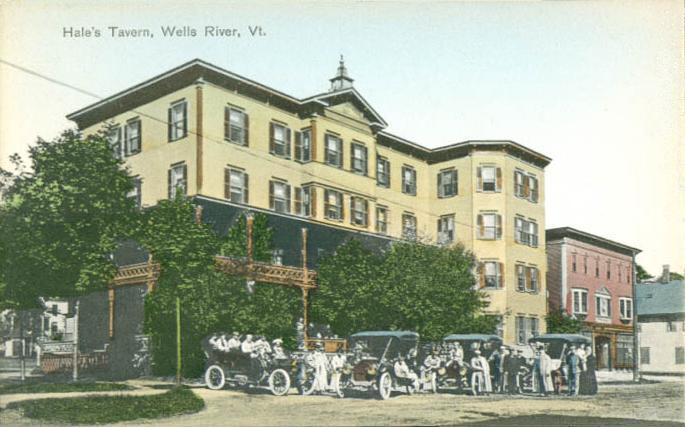
Hale's Tavern in 1915

The area was first called Governor's Right because 500 acres (200 ha) were granted to Governor Benning Wentworth of New Hampshire. It was purchased by Er Chamberlin, who built a gristmill on the Wells River. Located at the head of navigation for the Connecticut River, Wells River developed as a center for trade. Canal boats guided by long poles floated downriver laden with lumber, clapboards and shingles, returning with goods such as iron, salt, rum and molasses. In the 1830s and 1840s, Jacob Kent Jr. was the proprietor of the Coosuck House, a well-known Wells River hotel.

On November 6, 1848, the Connecticut and Passumpsic Rivers Railroad opened to Wells River, rendering obsolete the river's barge traffic. In 1853–1854, the Boston, Concord and Montreal Railroad reached Woodsville, New Hampshire across the Connecticut River. It built division offices and repair facilities, transforming that village into a booming railway town. The line replaced the 1805 bridge over the narrows to Wells River with a two-level wooden span which combined a toll highway deck at the bottom of the truss, with railroad tracks on the roof. In 1903, a steel bridge of similar configuration replaced it. In 1873, the Montpelier and Wells River Railroad was completed, enhancing the region's position as a railroad junction.

=== Historic buildings ===
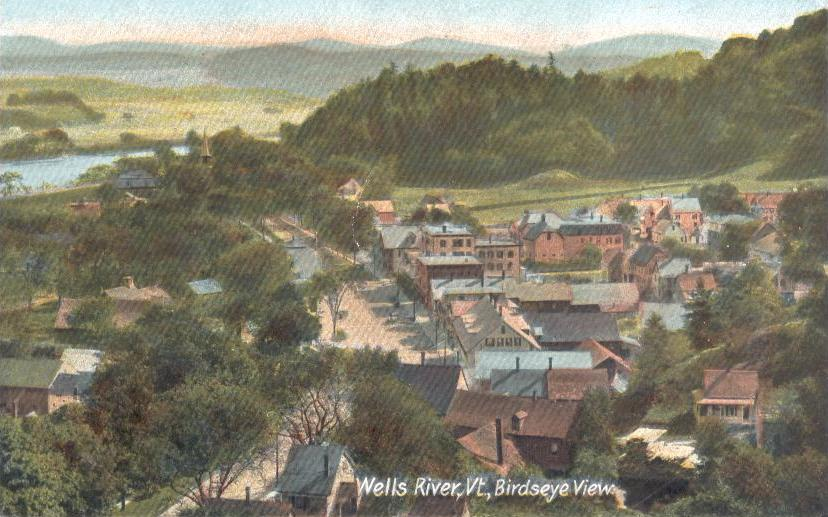
Wells River in 1907

Some of the more significant historic structures in the village are:

- Wells River Congregational Church, Main Street, 1839, 1869, 1894
- Wells River Graded School, Main Street, 1874 (listed separately on the National Register)
- Mulliken-Davis Store, Main Street, c. 1871
- U.S. Post Office, 26 Main Street: (c. 1840)
- Baldwin Memorial Library, Main Street, c. 1840
- G. Gould House, 7 Main Street, c. 1794, c. 1830
- Baldwin-Simonds House, North end of Main Street, c. 1890
- Wells River Village Hall, Cross Street, 1908

== Geography ==
The village takes its name from the Wells River, which flows into the Connecticut River at the eastern edge of the village. According to the United States Census Bureau, the village has a total area of 2.0 square miles (5.1 km^{2}), all of it land.

Wells River is crossed by Interstate 91, U.S. Route 5, and U.S. Route 302, with Routes 5 and 302 briefly running concurrently, before Route 302 crosses the Connecticut River into New Hampshire.

== Demographics ==
Historical population
Census	Pop.	Note	%±
1880	513		—
1890	526		2.5%
1900	565		7.4%
1910	608		7.6%
1920	606		−0.3%
1930	553		−8.7%
1940	527		−4.7%
1950	570		8.2%
1960	472		−17.2%
1970	419		−11.2%
1980	396		−5.5%
1990	424		7.1%
2000	325		−23.3%
2010	399		22.8%
2020	431		8.0%
U.S. Decennial Census

As of the census of 2000, there were 325 people, 156 households, and 92 families residing in the village. The population density was 167.0 people per square mile (64.4/km^{2}). There were 178 housing units at an average density of 91.5/sq mi (35.2/km^{2}). The racial makeup of the village was 99.69% White and 0.31% African American.

There were 156 households, out of which 25.0% had children under the age of 18 living with them, 42.3% were married couples living together, 11.5% had a female householder with no husband present, and 40.4% were non-families. 39.1% of all households were made up of individuals, and 19.2% had someone living alone who was 65 years of age or older. The average household size was 2.08 and the average family size was 2.67.

In the village, the population was spread out, with 23.1% under the age of 18, 5.8% from 18 to 24, 22.8% from 25 to 44, 24.9% from 45 to 64, and 23.4% who were 65 years of age or older. The median age was 44 years. For every 100 females, there were 77.6 males. For every 100 females age 18 and over, there were 83.8 males.

The median income for a household in the village was $28,021, and the median income for a family was $32,708. Males had a median income of $28,056 versus $21,250 for females. The per capita income for the village was $14,705. About 6.5% of families and 11.1% of the population were below the poverty line, including 6.1% of those under age 18 and 2.1% of those age 65 or over.

== Notable people ==
- Jacob Kent Jr., public official who served as Orange County Sheriff and U.S. Marshal for Vermont
- William A. Russell, U.S. Congressman from Massachusetts
- Abel Underwood, Vermont prosecutor, legislator, and judge

== See also ==
- National Register of Historic Places listings in Orange County, Vermont
