= District School No. 1 =

District School No. 1 may refer to:

- District School No. 1 (Bethlehem, New York), listed on the National Register of Historic Places in Albany County, New York
- District School No. 1 (Panton, Vermont), listed on the National Register of Historic Places in Addison County, Vermont
- District School No. 1 (Shelby, Wisconsin), listed on the National Register of Historic Places in La Crosse County, Wisconsin
