= Cornwall General Store =

- U.S. National Register of Historic Places
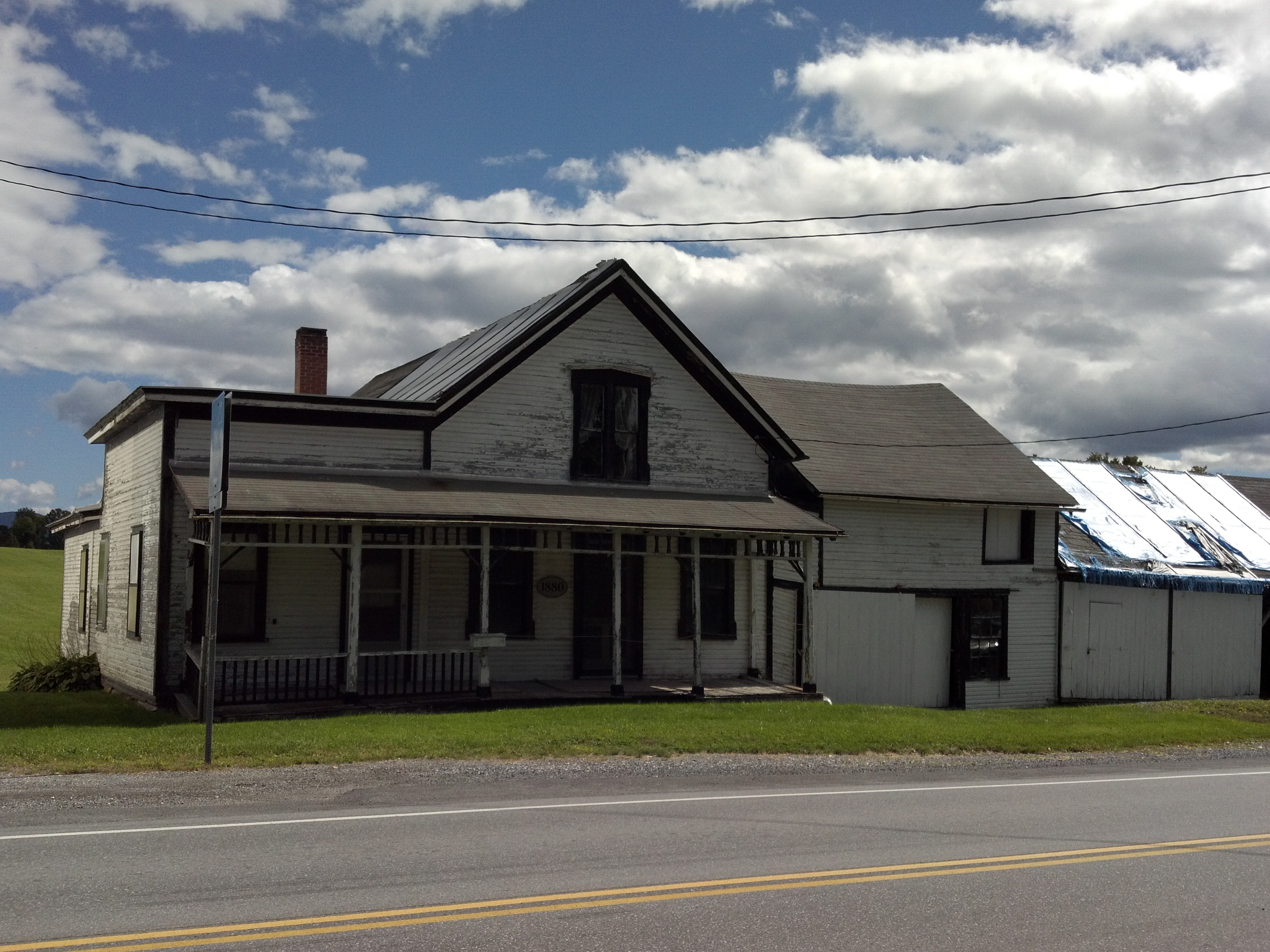
- The store in 2012

- Location within Vermont Location within the United States
- Location: 2635 VT 30, Seth Warner Highway, Cornwall, Vermont
- Coordinates: 43°57′40″N 73°12′34″W
- Area: less than one acre
- Built: 1880
- NRHP reference No.: 05000804
- Added to NRHP: August 6, 2005

The Cornwall General Store, also known as the LaValley General Store, was a historic commercial building at 2635 Vermont Route 30 in the center of Cornwall, Vermont. Built in 1880 and in retail use for more than half a century, it was a well-preserved example of a dwindling business type, the rural general store with attached residence, listed on the National Register of Historic Places in 2005. Sold to the town for preservation in 2000, it was demolished about 2013.

== Description and history ==
The Cornwall General Store was located in the small village center of Cornwall, on the east side of Vermont Route 30, immediately south of Cornwall Town Hall. It was a rambling 1 1/2-story wood-frame structure, with a gable-roofed main section that has additions to both sides and the rear. It was finished in wooden clapboards, and the main block and left addition had a Victorian porch extending across them. The interior of the store had retained many original features, including store fixtures and oil lamps on the wall.

The store was built about 1880 by Conrad Frost, at a time when the town's village center was just beginning to take shape. The Congregational Church and village common had been a focal point since 1803, and the town hall had just been built. Frost's choice of location was well made, for he drove a well-established store a short way north of the center out of business by 1890. The store was bought in 1918 by William LaValley, and was operated by his family until 1940. May LaValley occupied the residential portion of the building until 1997, and in 2000 it was sold by her heirs to the town in the hopes that it would be preserved. In 2012, the town voted to either demolish or sell the dilapidated structure. Funds for its demolition were appropriated in 2013, and in 2014 the town was considering other uses of the parcel, including for a potential expansion of town hall.

== See also ==
- National Register of Historic Places listings in Addison County, Vermont
