= Waybury Inn =

- U.S. National Register of Historic Places
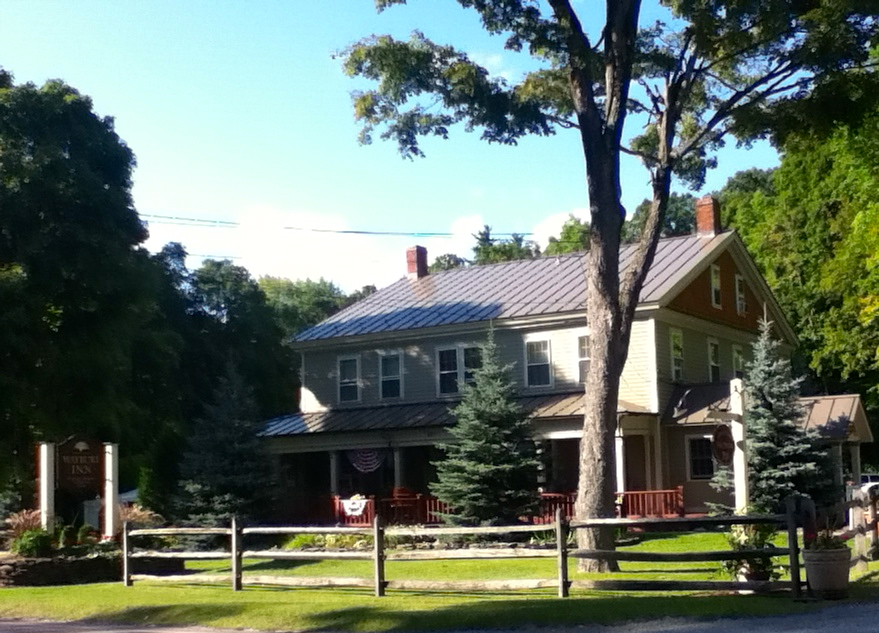

- Location within Vermont Location within the United States
- Location: 457 East Main Street; East Middlebury, Vermont
- Coordinates: 43°58′18.37″N 73°05′31.35″W
- Built: 1810
- Architect: John Foot
- NRHP reference No.: 83003204
- Added to NRHP: July 14, 1983

The Waybury Inn is an inn at 457 East Main Street in Middlebury, Vermont, United States. The inn was built in 1810, and is one of the oldest operating traveler's accommodations in the state. It was listed on the National Register of Historic Places in 1983. It is well known for its use in exterior shots of the Newhart television series.

== Description ==
The Waybury Inn is located on the north side of East Main Street (Vermont Route 125), near the eastern end of East Middlebury village. It is set near the westernmost end of one of the major routes across the Green Mountains in central Vermont. It consists of a 2 1/2-story gable-roofed main block, from which a two-story block extends to the rear. A single-story porch, covered by a hip roof, extends across the front and around to one side. The interior is arranged in a central hall plan, with large rooms, extending the full depth of the main block, on either side of the main staircase.

== History ==
The inn was built in 1810 by John Foot (or Foote). The pass to the east had opened as a toll road (turnpike) in 1808, and Foot sought to capitalize on the traffic it would bring. However, the turnpike never brought a high volume of traffic, and efforts to develop a glassworks in the village also cramped growth in the area. Moderate growth in the village by 1850 prompted its second proprietor, Royal Farr, to expand the premises in 1867 by adding the ell to the rear. This included a ballroom, and Farr added other amenities to make the inn a local site for social events. The inn was variously known as the Glen House and Green Mountain House before being given its present name in the 20th century. The only period of time in which the inn was closed was during World War II.

The inn maintains a tradition in which, in room 9, there is an antique desk with a secret drawer. Following the lead of a couple who found the drawer in 1987, guests often put notes in the drawer.

The Waybury Inn was also used as a location for exterior shots on the Bob Newhart television series, Newhart, from 1982 to 1990. Featured as the Stratford Inn, the Waybury Inn was painted white for the show. After the show went off the air in 1990, the inn was repainted green to match the nearby Green Mountains.

== See also ==
- National Register of Historic Places listings in Addison County, Vermont
