= Paris and Anna Fletcher House =

Historic house in Vermont, United States

- U.S. National Register of Historic Places
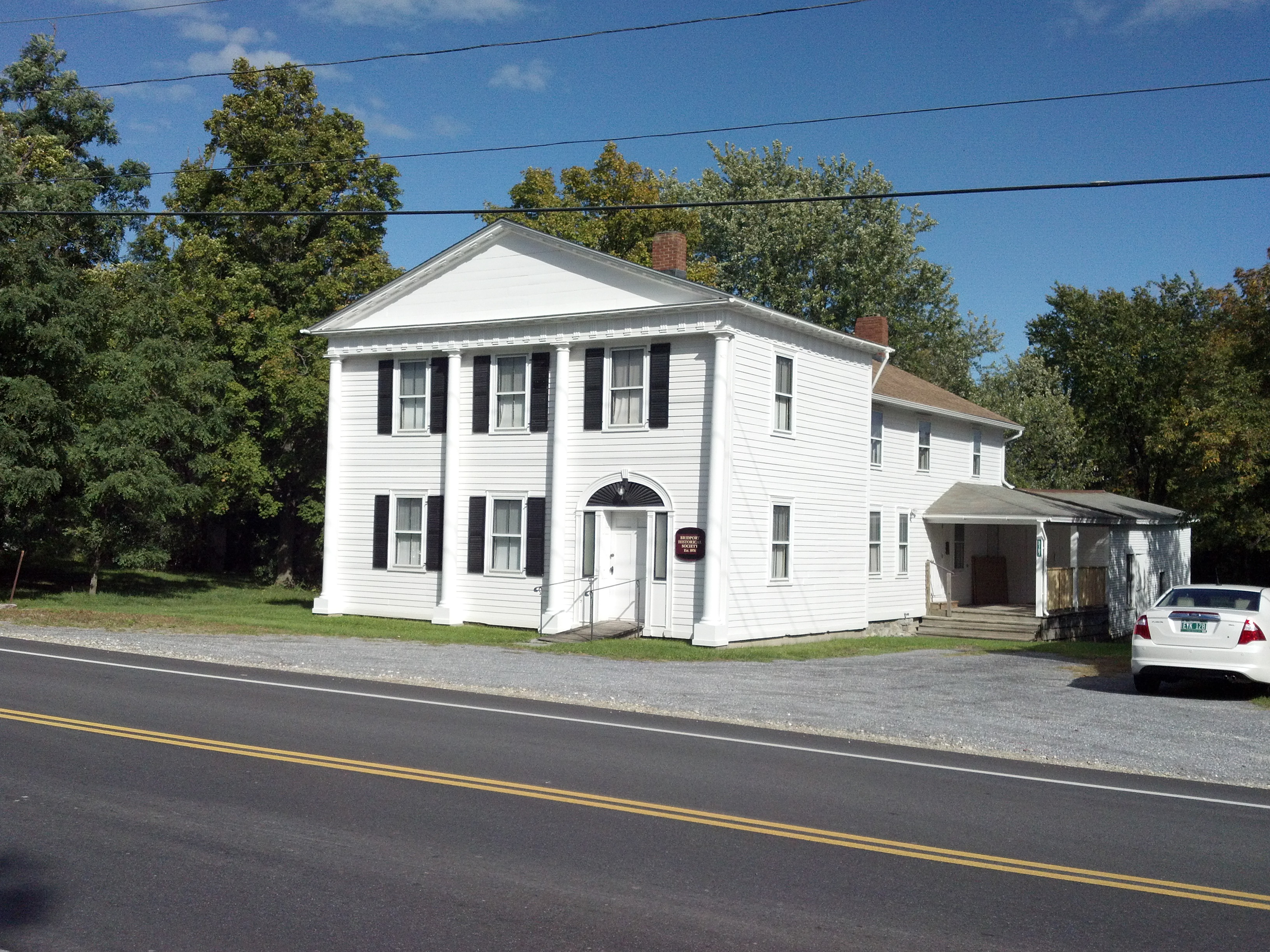

- Location within Vermont Location within the United States
- Location: VT 22A, N of jct. with Middle Rd., Bridport, Vermont
- Coordinates: 43°59′7″N 73°18′48″W
- Area: less than one acre
- Built: 1813
- Architectural style: Federal
- NRHP reference No.: 99000218
- Added to NRHP: February 12, 1999

The Paris and Anna Fletcher House is a historic house on Vermont Route 22A in Bridport, Vermont. Built about 1813 and enlarged in the 1820s, it is a fine local example of late Federal architecture, with a distinctive shallow Doric portico. It was listed on the National Register of Historic Places in 1999, and now houses the local historical society.

== Description and history ==
The Fletcher House stands near the center of Bridport village, on the east side of Vermont 22A just north of its junction with Middle Road. It is a 2 1/2-story wood-frame structure, with a front-facing gabled roof, clapboarded exterior, and stone foundation. The front facade has a fully pedimented gable with flushboarded center and decorated border. A shallow four-column Doric portico (projecting just 1 inch (2.5 cm) from the facade) supports the gable. The facade has three bays, which do not quite align within the bays created by portico columns. The main entrance is in the rightmost bay, flanked by sidelight windows and topped by a Federal style fanlight. A two-story ell and single-story shed project to the rear. The interior of the house is decorated with modest Federal period elements.

The oldest portion of the house, its rear ell, was built c. 1813-15 by Paris Fletcher, around the time of his marriage to Anna Miner. Fletcher was an entrepreneur of the period, engaging in a number of business pursuits, and operated a general store near the house between 1826 and 1875. The building's exterior and interior architectural details resemble elements published in Asher Benjamin's Country Builder's Assistant. By the 20th century, the house had been sold out of the Fletcher family, and it was given to the Bridport Historical Society in 1974.

== See also ==
- National Register of Historic Places listings in Addison County, Vermont
