= Camp Marbury =

- Camp Marbury Historic District
- U.S. National Register of Historic Places
- U.S. Historic district
- Location within Vermont Location within the United States
- Location: 243, 245 & 293 Mile Point Rd., Ferrisburgh, Vermont
- Coordinates: 44°11′59″N 73°21′26″W
- Area: 7.3 acres (3.0 ha)
- Built: 1921
- MPS: Organized Summer Camping in Vermont MPS
- NRHP reference No.: 100003222
- Added to NRHP: December 6, 2018

Camp Marbury was a summer camp for girls on Lake Champlain in Ferrisburgh, Vermont. Founded in 1921, the family-run camp operated until 1942, when it closed due to logistical difficulties associated with World War II. The camp property is listed on the National Register of Historic Places.

== History ==
The camp property was purchased in 1921 by Mary P. and Henry Dike Sleeper, and Hugh and Helen Worthington. The Sleepers, residents of Northampton, Massachusetts, had previously served as counselors at the Aloha Camp, one of the state's oldest summer camps. The camp was run by the Sleepers and later their children, serving as many as fifty campers. In addition to water-based activities on the lakefront, the camp offered tennis, riding, and craft programs. The camp was affected by rationing programs during World War II, and closed in 1942. Its fixtures were auctioned off in 1945, although Harriet Sleeper retained a summer residence on the property until her death in 1975.

== Camp property ==
The camp occupied 7.3 acres (3.0 ha) of waterfront property just north of the Basin Harbor Resort. The complex of buildings on the property, built between about 1900 and 1942, are in the Adirondack and Bungalow styles, and included architect-designed structures for the camp's use. After Harriet Sleeper's death in 1975, the property was subdivided, and is now in three separate individual private ownerships. One of the camp's buildings, its "Junior Roost", is now on the campus of the nearby Lake Champlain Maritime Museum. Despite the now separated ownership, the camp grounds and facilities remain discernible in the landscape.

== See also ==
- National Register of Historic Places listings in Addison County, Vermont
