= Salisbury Village Blacksmith Shop =

- U.S. National Register of Historic Places
- Location within Vermont Location within the United States
- Location: 925 Maple St., Salisbury, Vermont
- Coordinates: 43°53′47″N 73°6′5″W
- Area: less than one acre
- Built: c. 1795
- NRHP reference No.: 100005912
- Added to NRHP: December 9, 2020

The Salisbury Village Blacksmith Shop is a historic industrial building at 925 Maple Street in Salisbury, Vermont. The site has a documented industrial history back to the late 18th century, and the building is the last surviving remnant of a once-bustling industrial area adjacent to Salisbury village. The building was listed on the National Register of Historic Places in 2020.

== Description and history ==
The Salisbury Village Blacksmith Shop is located in the heart of Salisbury Village, roughly across Maple Street from the town hall. It is a two-story wood-frame structure, with a gabled slate roof and clapboarded exterior. The construction is post-and-beam typical of the late 18th century. Its three-bay front facade is dominated by a pair of hinged doors that provide access to the building in the central bay. A 1 1/2-story ell, also of post-and-beam construction but built in the 19th century, extends to the rear. The main block's interior is a large open space, with the forge area located in the northwest section. Constructed of brick and stone, this area includes a large hearth and fireplace, chimney, and a bellows constructed of wood and leather.

The main block of the shop was probably built in 1794–95, when John Deming moved to Salisbury and established his smithy. The business would remain in the Deming family for two more generations before being sold to John Petersen in 1904. It remained in use by the Petersens as a smithy into the 1950s, and was sold out of the family in 2019. John Deming and his sons, in addition to running the smithy, also owned and operated mills and other industrial properties along the Leicester River, an area that was one of the most heavily industrialized areas in Vermont in the early 19th century.

== See also ==
- National Register of Historic Places listings in Addison County, Vermont
