= House at 215 School Street =

Historic house in Vermont, United States

- U.S. National Register of Historic Places
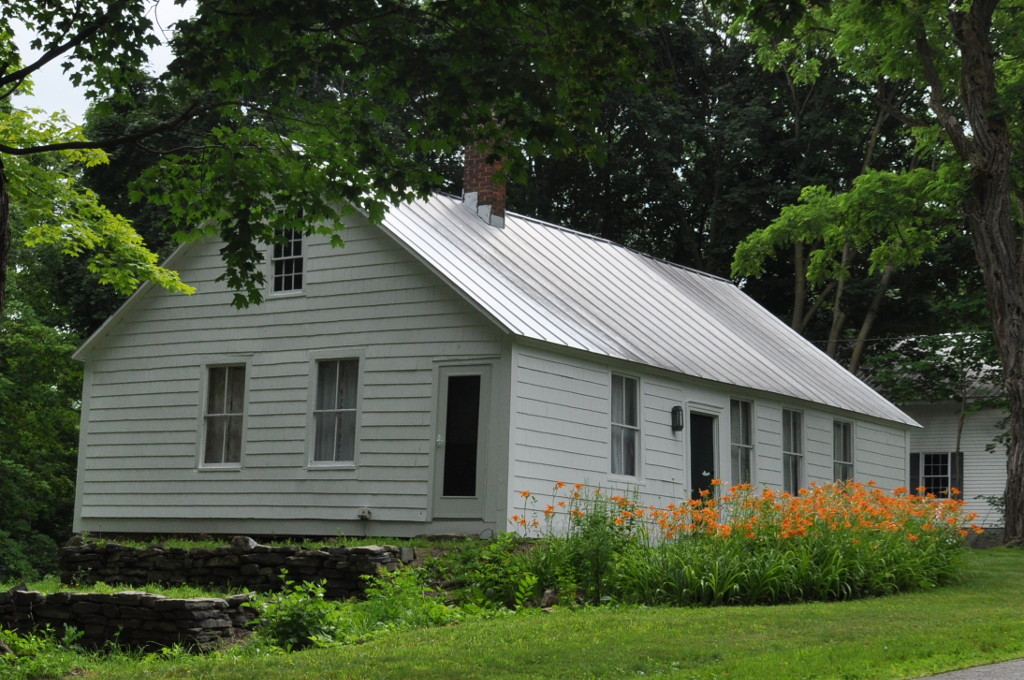

- Location within Vermont Location within the United States
- Location: 215 School St., Shoreham, Vermont
- Coordinates: 43°53′33″N 73°18′55″W
- Area: 4.2 acres (1.7 ha)
- Architectural style: Federal
- NRHP reference No.: 05001423
- Added to NRHP: December 16, 2005

The House at 215 School Street in Shoreham, Vermont is probably the town's oldest surviving house. The modest single-story Cape was built about 1795, probably by Job Lane Howe, a prominent regional master builder who was a cousin to Oliver Howe, the early town settler for whom it was built. The house was listed on the National Register of Historic Places in 2005.

== Description and history ==
215 School Street is located just south of the town common, on the east side of School Street southeast of its junction with Oliver Howe Court. It is a 1 1/2-story wood frame Cape style structure, with a gabled roof, shingled exterior, and stone foundation. A single-bay attached garage is set back on the right side. The main facade is asymmetrical, with four window bays and the main entrance located to the right of the leftmost window. The door is an original four-panel door. The interior retains a significant number of original features, include plaster walls with wainscoting, doors with strap hinges, and the original massive chimney base in the cellar. (The original chimney was replaced in the 19th century with a narrower brick one.

The house was built about 1795 on a lot assigned to Oliver Howe in the early layout of the town center. It was probably built by Howe's cousin, Job Howe, who is a period builder well known for more high style Federal period houses in the region. The house was owned for many years by members of the locally prominent Bush family, and underwent a major restoration in 2004.

== See also ==
- National Register of Historic Places listings in Addison County, Vermont
