= Glen Dale Farm =

- Glen Dale
- U.S. National Register of Historic Places
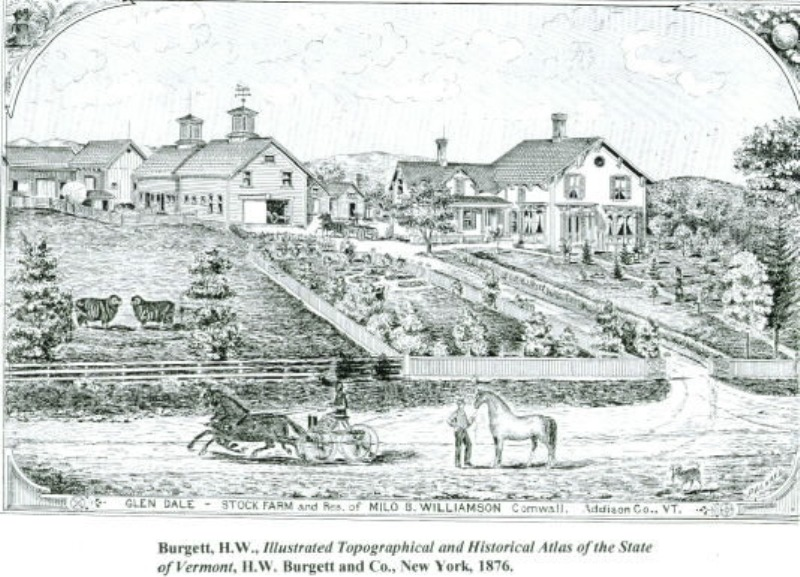
- Burgett lithograph of Glen Dale Farm in 1876

- Location within Vermont Location within the United States
- Location: 1455 Cider Mill Rd., Cornwall, Vermont
- Coordinates: 44°0′10″N 73°12′34″W
- Area: 3.5 acres (1.4 ha)
- Built: 1780
- Architectural style: Italianate, English barn
- MPS: Agricultural Resources of Vermont MPS
- NRHP reference No.: 02000776
- Added to NRHP: July 11, 2002

Glen Dale Farm is a historic farm property at 1455 Cider Mill Road in Cornwall, Vermont. Its 3.5-acre (1.4 ha) property, which includes five contributing buildings, was listed as Glen Dale on the National Register of Historic Places in 2002. Farmed since the 1770s, the farm achieved prominence in the second half of the 19th century as one of the nation's top breeding sites of merino sheep.

== Features ==
Significant features of the English barn include hand-hewn, post-and-beam, hardwood timber frame, with flared columns and half dovetail tenons on the girts. Sheathing boards visible from the inside appear to be original as they are up to 2 feet wide and fastened with hand-wrought nails. In the 18th century, this structure would have been a general-purpose barn, sheltering grain and hay crops as well as farm animals. The construction materials and remarkable joinery in the English barn speak eloquently of this period in local history.

Glen Dale Farm attained its present appearance under the ownership of Milo B. Williamson, a breeder of Merino sheep and "gentleman's driving horses". The present Italianate style farmhouse and additional barns are pictured in Burgett's 1876 Illustrated and Topographical Atlas of the State of Vermont. The barn complex is remarkably intact when compared to the Burgett illustration and constitutes one of the best surviving examples of nineteenth century stock and sheep farms in the state.

The English barn is the second from the left as pictured in the Burgett lithograph. The two larger barns in front were built to house horses and carriages. The ventilated cupolas and the raking eaves trim are typical of barns built in Vermont during the 1870s and 1880s. The rearmost structure is the sheep barn, one of the few remaining unaltered such buildings in the state.

== Ownership ==
Glen Dale owner Milo B. Williamson was a prominent figure in the Vermont Merino Sheep Breeders' Association. He was treasurer of the association in 1879-1881, and president in 1882-1883. In partnership with Jerome P. Cherbino of Middlebury, he owned and bred Spanish stock Merino sheep during the period when Addison County dominated the world market.

== History ==
According to Mathews’ History of the Town of Cornwall, Solomon Linsley settled the land that Glen Dale Farm occupies in 1774. The Town of Cornwall received its original charter from the Governor of New Hampshire dated November 3, 1761. The names of sixty-five original grantees are endorsed on the back of the charter, which is still preserved among the archives of the town. The first non-aboriginal settlers within the original bounds of the Town of Cornwall arrived in 1774. There were fourteen of them but Linsley was the only one whose name is on the original charter. It is recorded that Gamaliel Painter of Middlebury surveyed 100 acres (40 ha) for Solomon Linsley on October 23, 1774. Although the original farmhouse does not stand, Linsley probably built the existing English barn around 1775, as it is representative of the first major type of agricultural buildings constructed in Vermont.

Glen Dale Farm is a local landmark in the Town of Cornwall and surrounding environs. The 1871 Beers Atlas of Addison County shows the prominent location of the M.B. Williamson property on Cider Mill Road. John Axtell in the Vermont Division for Historic Preservation, Historic Sites and Structures Survey commented that Glen Dale Farm "... on its ridgetop site is and ought to be preserved as an accurate and invaluable document of post-Civil War agricultural life in Vermont." Considerable effort has been made to stabilize the barn structures with assistance from the Vermont Division for Historic Preservation.

The Division for Historic Preservation's book The Historic Architecture of Addison County lists the Glen Dale barns as being on the Vermont State Register of Historic Places. The farm is mentioned specifically in the introduction to the section on Cornwall, describing it as one of several model stock farms operating in Cornwall during the second half of the 19th century.

It was one subject of a 1991 study of historic agricultural resources in the state.

In July 2002, Glen Dale Farm was listed on the National Register of Historic Places.

== See also ==
- National Register of Historic Places listings in Addison County, Vermont
