= Chipman's Point =

- U.S. National Register of Historic Places
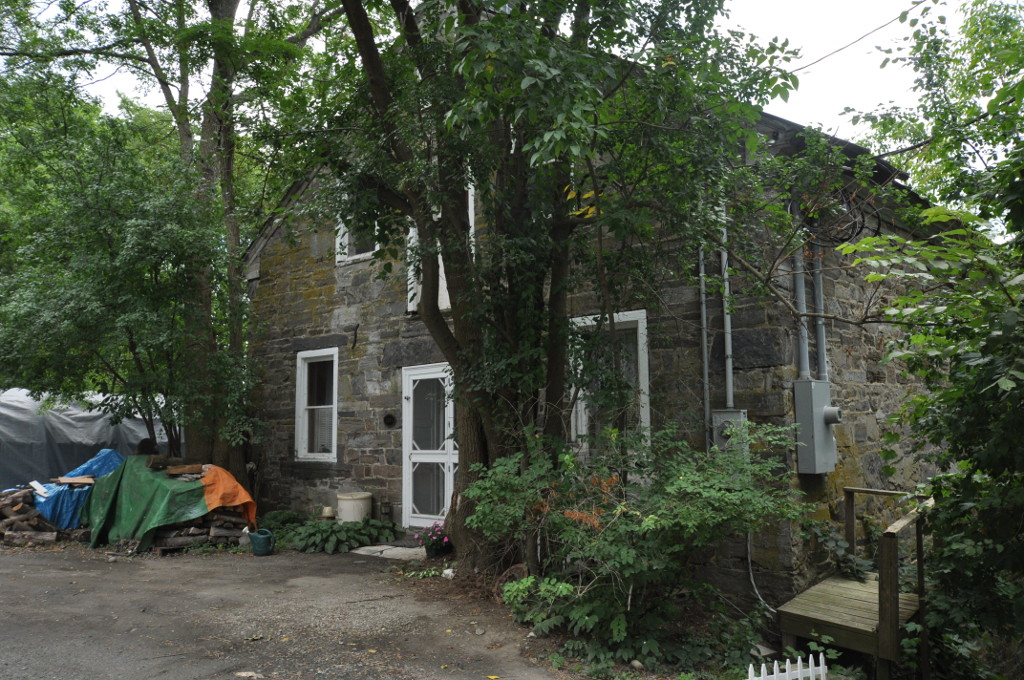

- Location within Vermont Location within the United States
- Location: Chipman Point Rd., Orwell, Vermont
- Coordinates: 43°47′59″N 73°22′32″W
- Area: 3 acres (1.2 ha)
- Built: 1810
- NRHP reference No.: 96001519
- Added to NRHP: December 26, 1996

Chipman's Point is a historic 19th-century ferry complex on Chipman Point Road in Orwell, Vermont. The complex includes two early 19th-century stone warehouses, a former Lake Champlain ferry landing site (used until 1975), and the foundational remains of the Chipman Point Hotel. It was listed on the National Register of Historic Places in 1996.

== Description and history ==
Chipman's Point is located on the eastern shore of Lake Champlain, in its narrow southern reach opposite Wright, New York. Chipman Point Road leads to the area from Vermont Route 73A, and ends at a former ferry landing slip, now used as a local boat launch and fishing site. To the south of the landing, in an area now occupied by a local marina, stand two large four-story stone warehouses, built on limestone outcrops directly on the lakeshore. On a terraced rise above the two warehouses are the foundational remnants of the Chipman Point Hotel. The warehouses and hotel ruins are composed mainly of local limestone, which probably came from quarry sites on nearby stone outcrops.

At the middle of the 19th century, Chipman's Point was one of Orwell's largest and busiest economic and commercial centers, with a church, post office, hotel, and residences, all oriented toward the ferry and shipping business. The warehouses were built to store goods awaiting passage by ship or to be picked up for local delivery, and the hotel (which burned in 1952) served travelers. The importance of the lake for transportation declined after the arrival of the railroad in the region in 1849, and even the ferry service across the lake was discontinued in 1975.

== See also ==
- National Register of Historic Places listings in Addison County, Vermont
