= Ripton Community House =

Historic church in Vermont, United States

- U.S. National Register of Historic Places
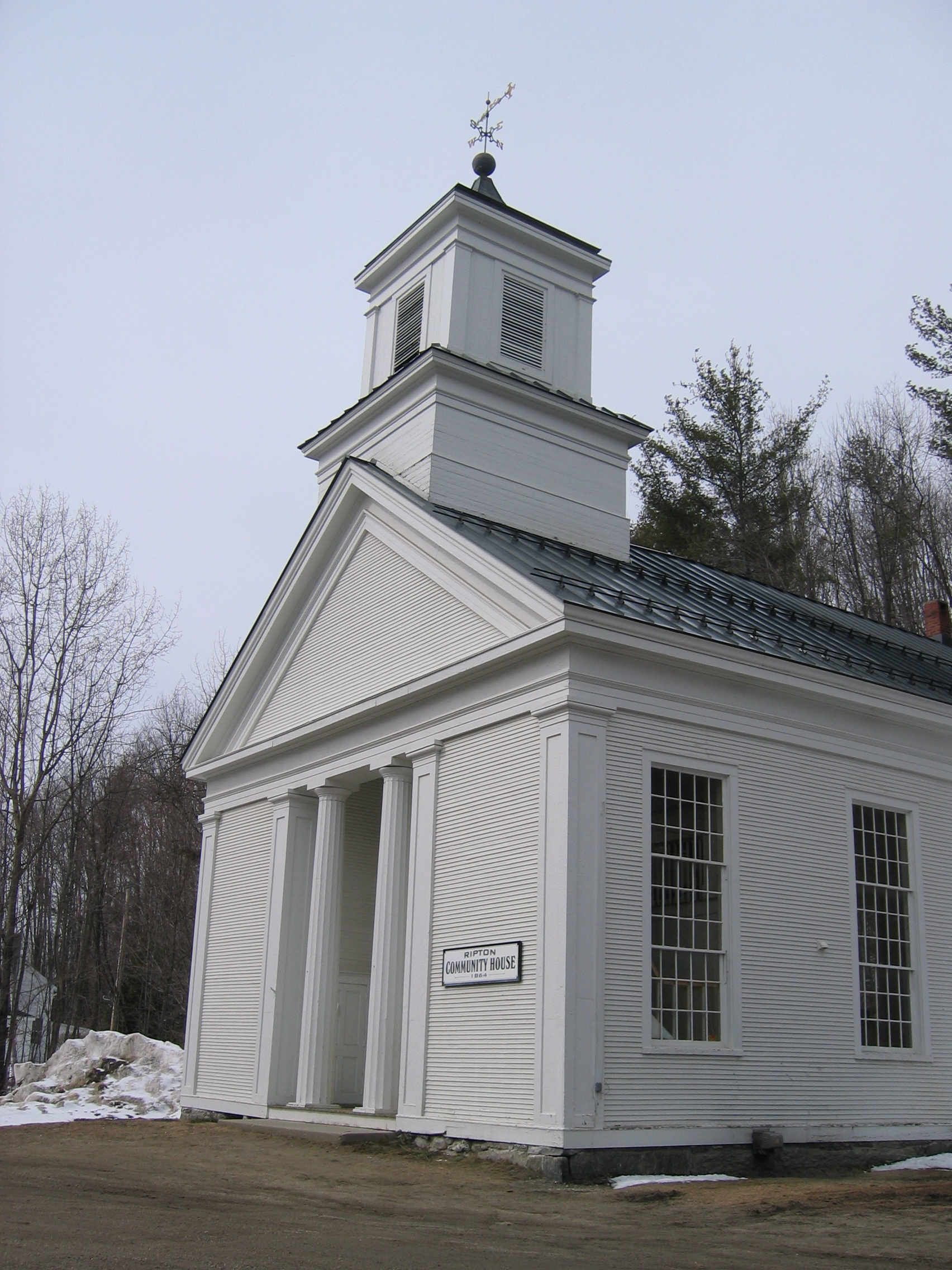

- Location within Vermont
- Location: On VT 125, Ripton, Vermont
- Coordinates: 43°58′30″N 73°2′14″W
- Area: 1 acre (0.40 ha)
- Built: 1864
- Architectural style: Greek Revival
- NRHP reference No.: 73000180
- Added to NRHP: July 3, 1973

The Ripton Community House, formerly the Ripton Congregational Church, is a historic former church and present community hall on Vermont Route 125 in the village of Ripton, Vermont. Built in 1864 for a Congregationalist church, it has since served as a community clubhouse and town-owned meeting hall, and is a fine local example of vernacular Greek Revival architecture. It was listed on the National Register of Historic Places in 1973.

== Description and history ==
The Ripton Community House stands at the center of the rural village center of Ripton, on the north side of Vermont Route 125 among other civic buildings. It is a two-story wood-frame structure, with a gabled roof, clapboarded exterior, and foundation of stone and concrete. Paneled pilasters rise at the building corners to support a full entablature, with a fully pedimented gable above the front facade. A two-stage square tower, topped by a flared roof, rises above the roof ridge. The upper stage houses the belfry, with louvered openings and narrow corner pilasters. The main facade has a central recess in which the main entrance is found. The recess is flanked by paneled pilasters and has two fluted columns. The interior, originally a single story with gallery, was converted into two stories in the 1920s by extending the gallery level.

The structure was built in 1864 for the local Congregationalist church, on land donated by Silvester Fisher. It remained in their hands until 1920, when it was sold to a Methodist church group. In 1928 the building was deeded to the Ripton Community Club, which adapted the building for use as a community meeting hall, hosting social events, dances, and other community events. In 1968 the club folded, and the town took over the building, which continues to serve the community not just for social events, but town meetings as well.

== See also ==
- National Register of Historic Places listings in Addison County, Vermont
