= Old Stone Blacksmith Shop =

- U.S. National Register of Historic Places
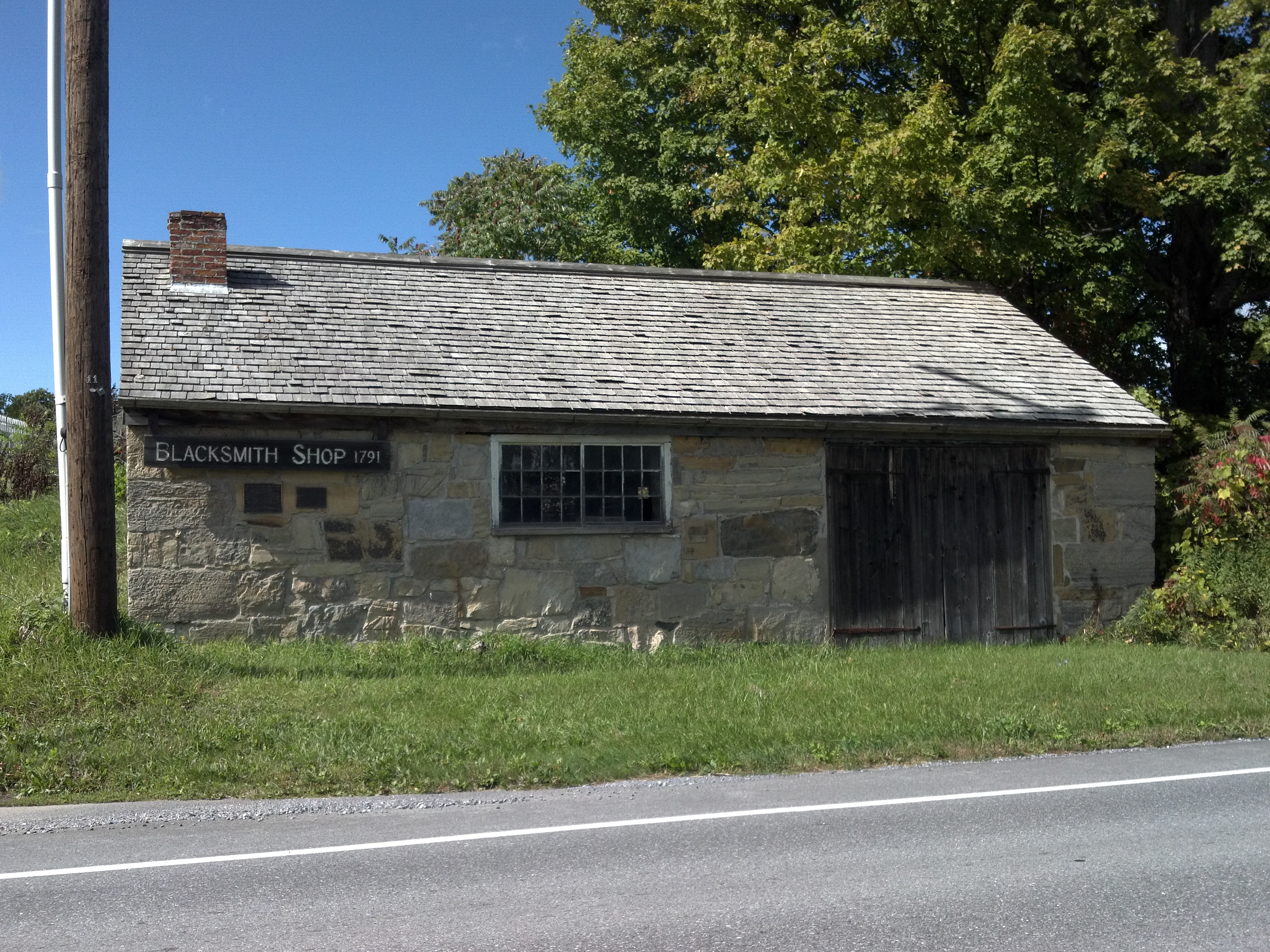

- Location within Vermont Location within the United States
- Location: VT 30, Cornwall, Vermont
- Coordinates: 43°58′39″N 73°12′21″W
- Area: 1 acre (0.40 ha)
- Built: 1791
- NRHP reference No.: 75000136
- Added to NRHP: April 21, 1975

The Old Stone Blacksmith Shop is a historic building on Vermont Route 30 in Cornwall, Vermont. Probably built in the late 18th century, it is a rare example in the state of a stone blacksmith shop, with a documented history of more than century's use for the purpose. It was listed on the National Register of Historic Places in 1975.

== Description and history ==
The Old Stone Blacksmith Shop stands in a rural area of Cornwall, on the west side of Vermont Route 30 about midway between its junctions with Ridge and Robbins Roads. It is a single-story structure, fashioned out of irregularly coursed limestone and covered by a gabled roof. The building corners are set in a quoined fashion with more regularly cut stone. It is set into a sharp rise, so its front is fully exposed, but its rear wall is almost completely below grade. The front facade has a horizontally rectangular window at the center, and a two-leaf bay door to its right, fastened with wrought iron strap hinges. The gable ends have sash windows, and the protruding portion of the rear wall has narrow casement windows.

The shop has traditionally been given an early construction date of 1791, the year Thomas Pritchard purchased the property. Its construction style is consistent with other stone buildings built in the region as late as 1845. Pritchard is known to have sold an extant blacksmith shop in 1805, but it is unclear if it was this building. Regardless of its construction date, it is the oldest example of this type of service building in the community.

== See also ==
- National Register of Historic Places listings in Addison County, Vermont
