= Old Stone Row =

- U.S. National Register of Historic Places
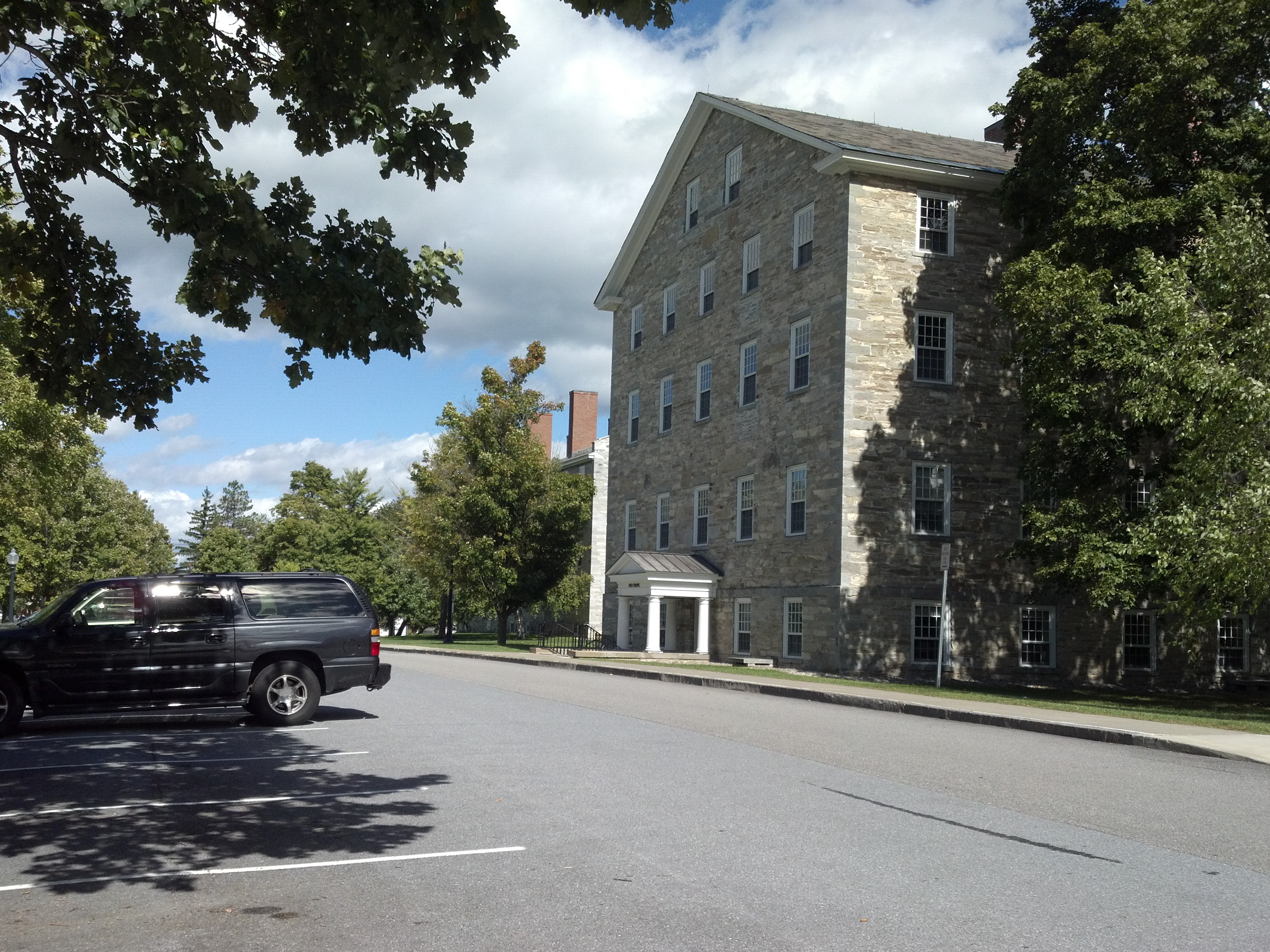

- Location within Vermont Location within the United States
- Location: Jct. of S. Main St. and Old Chapel Rd., Middlebury, Vermont
- Coordinates: 44°0′32″N 73°10′34″W
- Area: 7.5 acres (3.0 ha)
- Built: 1812
- Built by: Parsons, Asahel; Lamb, James M.
- Architectural style: Mid 19th Century Revival
- NRHP reference No.: 97001162
- Added to NRHP: September 18, 1997

Old Stone Row is a collection of three stone buildings flanking the original campus green of Middlebury College in Middlebury, Vermont. Painter Hall, built 1812-16, is the oldest surviving collegiate academic building in the state, with Old Chapel (1834–36) and Starr Hall (1865) as stylistic accompaniments, all based on vernacular mill construction styles of the period. The buildings and green were listed on the National Register of Historic Places in 1997.

== Description and history ==
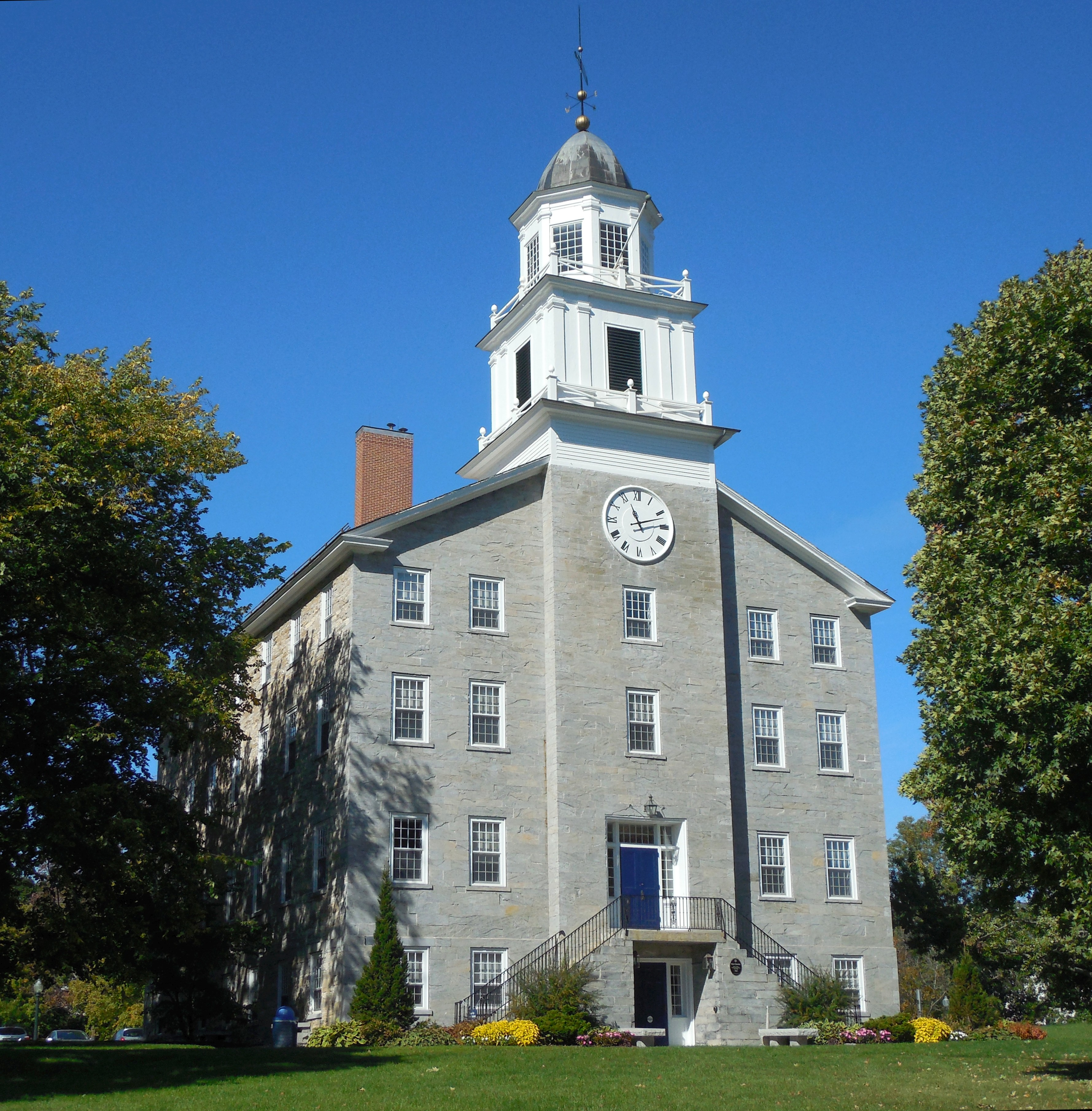
Old Chapel's bell tower stands at a height of 92 feet.

Old Stone Row is situated on the east side of the Middlebury College campus, and consists of three buildings standing atop a low ridge on the east side of Old Chapel Road, a north-south road that forms part of the campus circulation pattern. The campus's modern main quadrangle lies just to the west, while the buildings are actually oriented facing east, across, facing the original campus green and the village center of Middlebury. The three buildings are all stone structures, built of locally quarried limestone laid in irregular courses. Architecturally, their massing is somewhat typical of mill buildings of the period, although the Old Chapel, at the center of the group, is distinguished by a prominent three-stage belltower, and the orientation of its long axis (and main roofline) perpendicular to the others.

Painter Hall, the northernmost of the buildings, was constructed in 1812-16 as part of a building campaign organized in part due to competition with the University of Vermont at Burlington, which had built a substantial brick edifice in 1807. It was built and used mainly as a dormitory, although it has seen other uses in its history. Its design, virtually devoid of ornamentation, is reminiscent of a stone mill (no longer standing) built in Middlebury in 1811. Old Chapel was built in 1834-36, originally providing a chapel and instructional spaces, as well as a prominent visual focus for the campus. Starr Hall, south of the chapel, followed in the 1860s, built as the result of increased enrollment in the late 1850s. Its design is a clear reference to Painter Hall, although it is architecturally distinguished by projecting gabled bays with the entrances at their bases.

== See also ==
- National Register of Historic Places listings in Addison County, Vermont
