= First Congregational Church of Cornwall Parsonage =

Historic house in Vermont, United States

- U.S. National Register of Historic Places
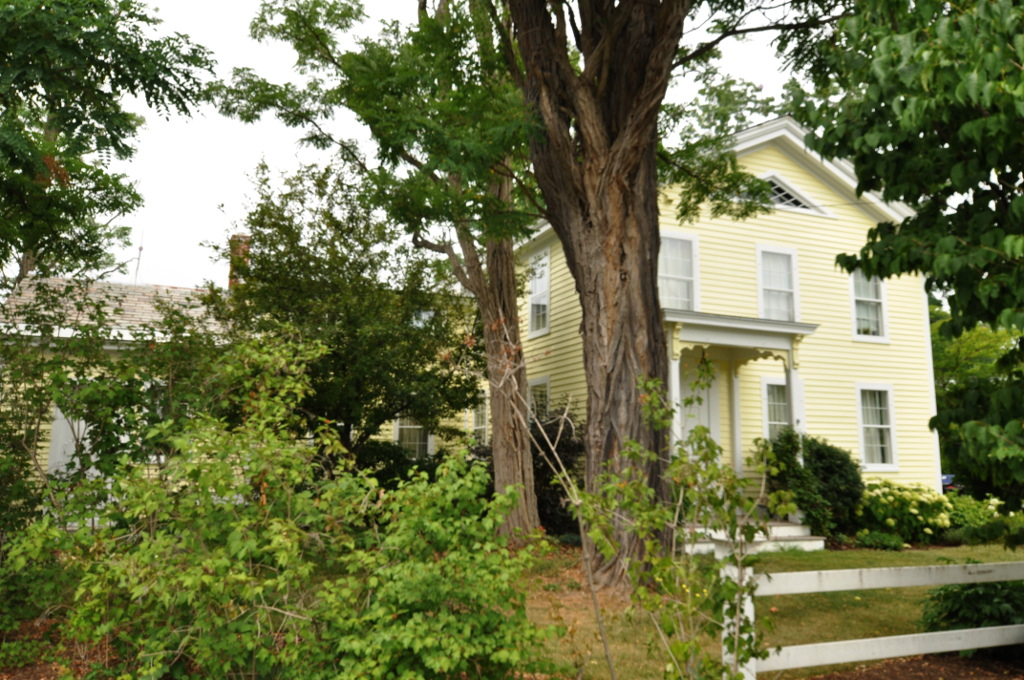

- Location within Vermont Location within the United States
- Location: 18 VT 74, Cornwall, Vermont
- Coordinates: 43°57′39″N 73°12′36″W
- Area: 1 acre (0.40 ha)
- Built: 1839
- Architectural style: Greek Revival
- NRHP reference No.: 15000376
- Added to NRHP: June 29, 2015

The First Congregational Church of Cornwall Parsonage is a historic house at 18 Vermont Route 74 in the center of Cornwall, Vermont. Built in 1839, it is a good local example of Greek Revival architecture, and served as a parsonage until 1994. It was listed on the National Register of Historic Places in 2015.

== Description and history ==
The former First Congregational Church parsonage stands in the village center of Cornwall, at the northwest corner of Vermont Routes 74 and 30. It is separated from the church, further north on Route 30, by another house. The parsonage is a 2 1/2-story wood-frame structure, with a front-facing gable roof, clapboarded exterior, and slate foundation. The front facade is three bays wide, with a triangular window in the gable and a side entry on the ground floor, sheltered by a late 19th-century Victorian porch. A cross-gabled ell extends to the left from the rear corner, and the present main entrance is set on the north side of the main block. The interior follows a central hall plan, with an original curved staircase. One of the downstairs chambers features a distinctive Rumford fireplace with beehive oven.

Cornwall's congregational church was organized in 1785, but did not build its first church until 1805. Its first permanent minister was granted land, but it was not until 1839 that the congregation agreed to build a parsonage for its fifth minister, Jacob Scales. Scales was locally controversial for his perceived weak position on the abolition of slavery, and was involved in disputes concerning the construction of the parsonage. He left a few years later, and the property was purchased by a group of congregants and deeded to the church. It remained in church ownership until 1994.

== See also ==
- National Register of Historic Places listings in Addison County, Vermont
