= Salisbury Congregational Church =

Historic church in Vermont, United States

- U.S. National Register of Historic Places
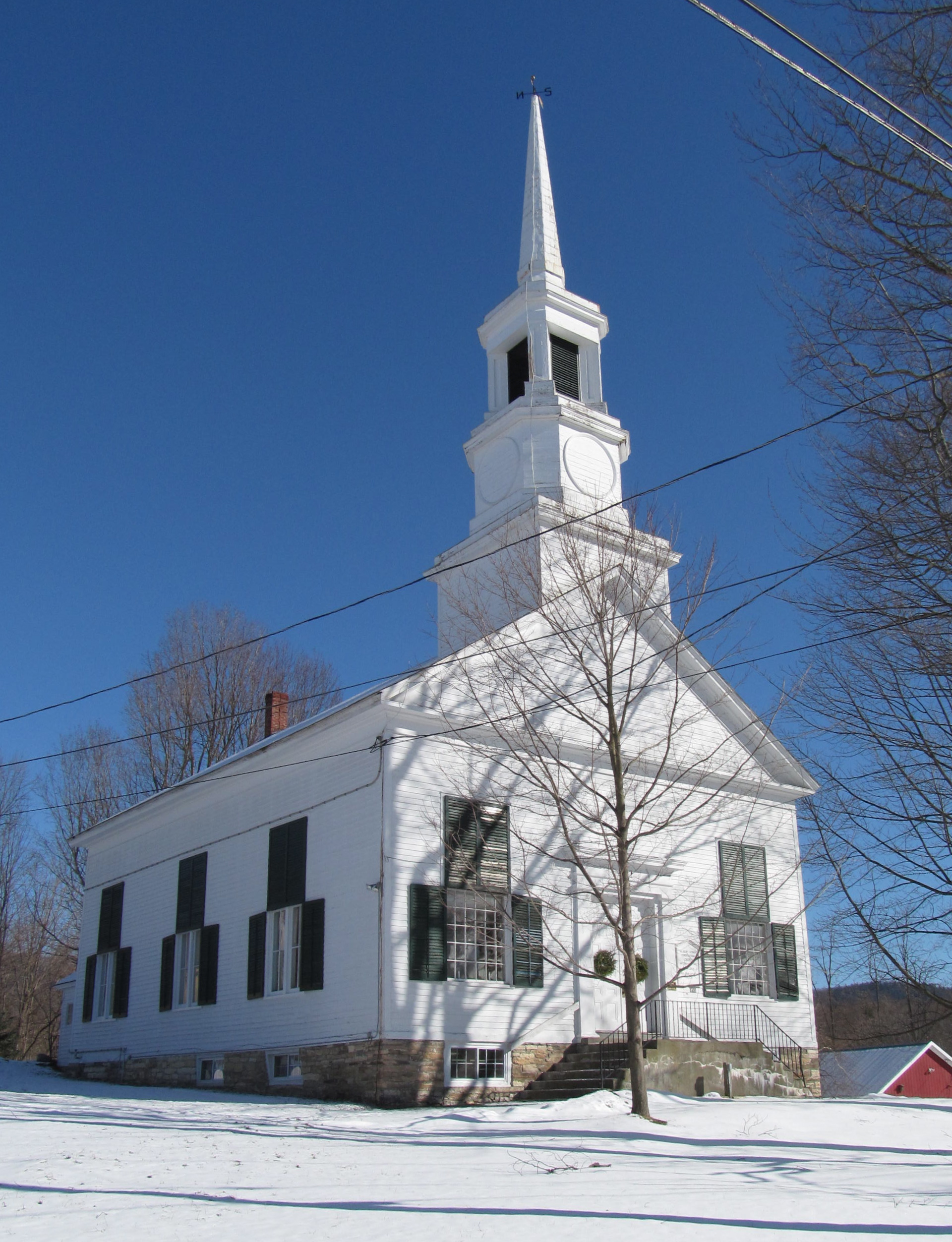

- Location within Vermont Location within the United States
- Location: 853 Maple St., Salisbury, Vermont
- Coordinates: 43°53′49″N 73°6′10″W
- Area: less than one acre
- Built: 1839
- Architect: Parsons, Asahel
- Architectural style: Greek Revival
- MPS: Religious Buildings, Sites and Structures in Vermont MPS
- NRHP reference No.: 01000212
- Added to NRHP: March 2, 2001

The Salisbury Congregational Church is a historic church in the village center of Salisbury, Vermont. Completed in 1842, it is fine local example of vernacular Greek Revival architecture. It was listed on the National Register of Historic Places in 2001.

== Description and history ==
The Salisbury Congregational Church is centrally located in Salisbury's small village center, on the north side of Maple Run Road. It is a single story wood-frame structure, with a gable roof, clapboarded exterior, and limestone foundation. The building corners have narrow corner boards, which rise to a modest entablature. The front-facing gable is fully pedimented with a plain clapboarded interior. The facade is symmetrical, with tall sash windows flanking the central entrance. The entrance is in a slight recess, framed by pilasters rising to an entablature and projecting cornice. A multistage tower rises from the roof ridge, starting with a square stage, above which an octagonal stage has plain circular panels in four faces. The belfry is in the next stage, which is basically square, with louvered sides and chamfered corners decorated with paneled pilasters. A slender spire caps the structure. The interior retains many original period features, including box pews and the pulpit area.

The church was built between 1840 and 1842 by Asahel Parsons, a local builder whose credits include churches in Middlebury. It is one of the prominent reminders of the town's 19th-century industrial past, having been built near the height of the town's importance as a regional mill center. Most of the materials for the church were locally produced: virgin timbers were milled in local mills, nails were forged at local ironworks, and a local historian claims its window glass also came from a glassworks operating at nearby Lake Dunmore.

== See also ==
- National Register of Historic Places listings in Addison County, Vermont
