= Monkton Town Hall =

- U.S. National Register of Historic Places
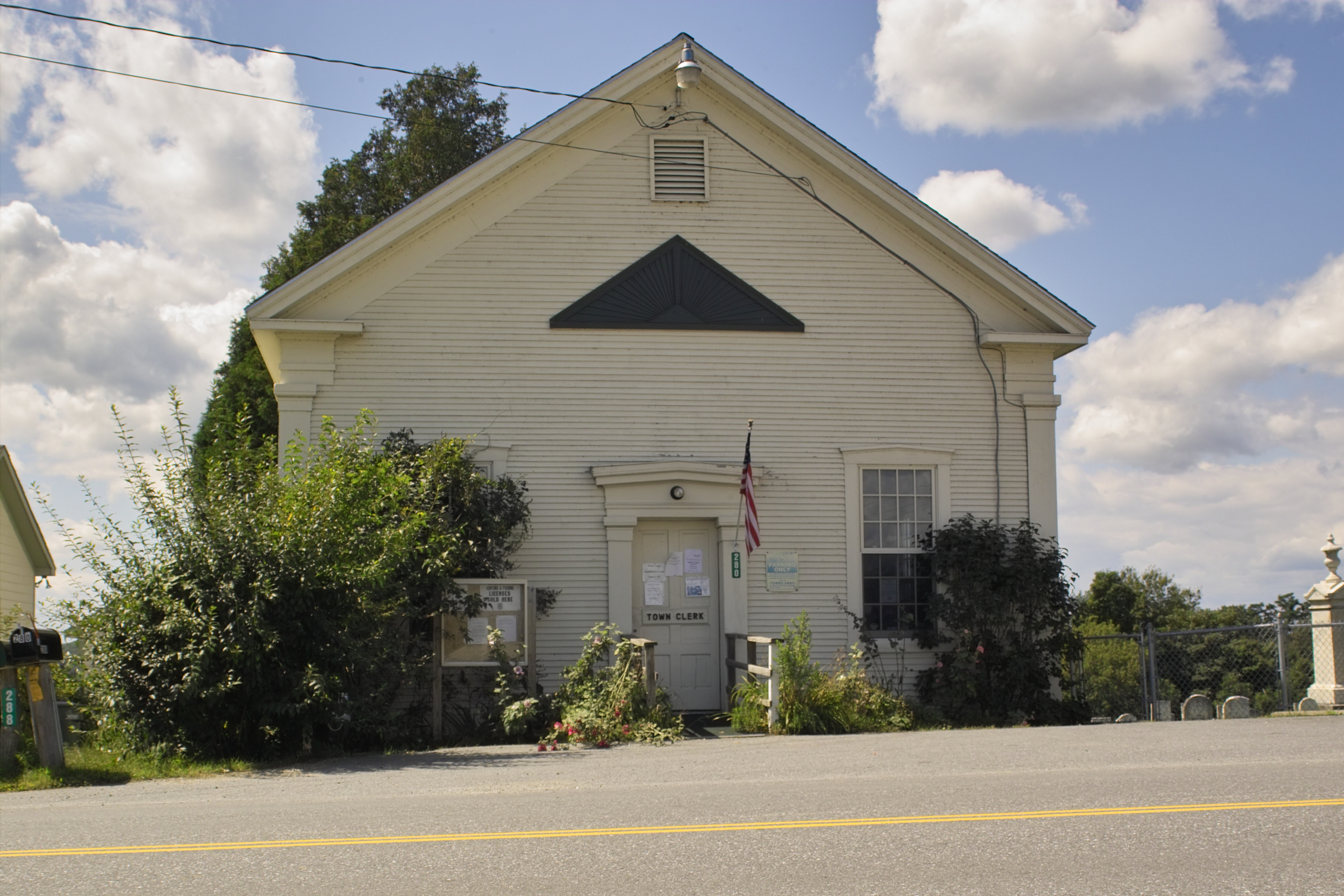

- Location within Vermont Location within the United States
- Location: Monkton Ridge Rd., Monkton, Vermont
- Coordinates: 44°15′13″N 73°7′30″W
- Area: less than one acre
- Built: 1859
- Architectural style: Greek Revival
- NRHP reference No.: 78000225
- Added to NRHP: January 3, 1978

Monkton Town Hall is a historic government building on Monkton Ridge Road in Monkton, Vermont. Built in 1859, it is a fine local example of Greek Revival architecture. For many years it was the site of town meetings, and it now houses the town offices. It was listed on the National Register of Historic Places in 1978.

== Description and history ==
Monkton Town Hall is located in the center of the village of Monkton Ridge in northern Monkton, on the west side of Monkton Ridge Road near its junction with State Prison Hollow Road. It is a single story wood-frame structure, with a gabled roof, clapboarded exterior, and rubblestone foundation. Its corners have pilasters, which rise to entablatures extending along the building sides. The main facade is relatively simple, with a central entrance flanked by sash windows, and a triangular panel in the gable above. The entrance is flanked by pilasters, and has an entablature with slightly gabled pediment above. The flanking windows have simpler surrounds, similarly gabled pediments. The interior consists of a single large chamber with a raised platform at the rear, with beaded wainscoting and plaster walls. Heavy chamfered posts near the front were originally used to support the building's cupola, which was blown off in a 20th-century hurricane.

The hall was built by the town in 1859, after its previous town hall (located in the village of Monkton Boro) was judged too small to house town meetings. It is the town's main example of 19th-century civic architecture, and is presently used to house town offices.

== See also ==
- National Register of Historic Places listings in Addison County, Vermont
