= Field Farm (Ferrisburgh, Vermont) =

- U.S. National Register of Historic Places
- U.S. Historic district
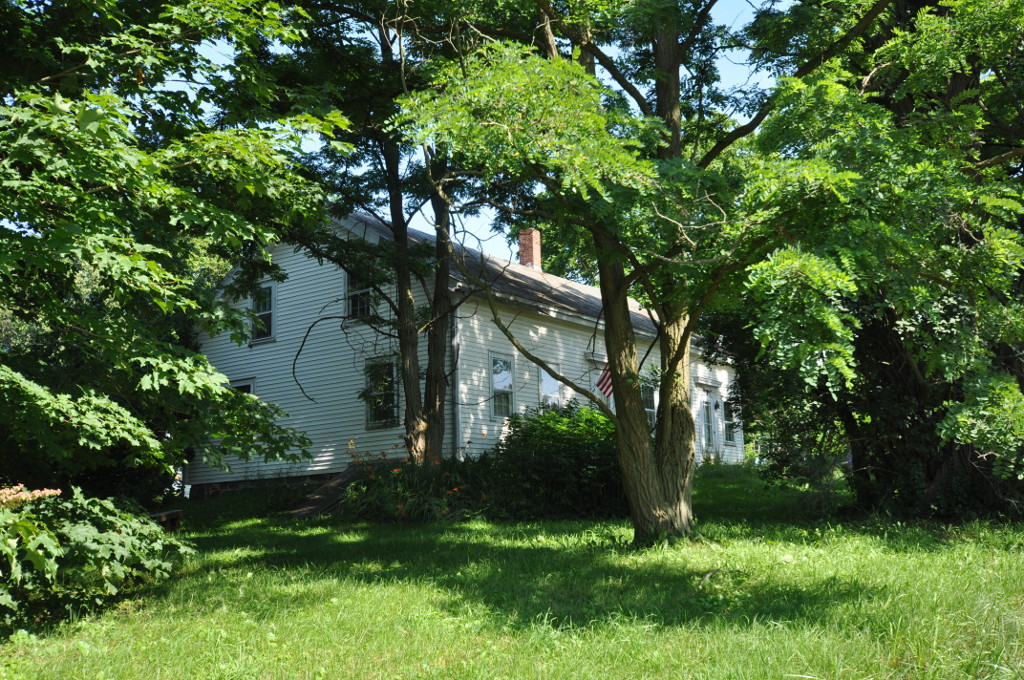

- Location within Vermont Location within the United States
- Location: Fuller Mountain Rd., Ferrisburgh, Vermont
- Coordinates: 44°13′34″N 73°11′56″W
- Area: 82.8 acres (33.5 ha)
- Built: 1807
- Architectural style: Cape Cod
- MPS: Agricultural Resources of Vermont MPS
- NRHP reference No.: 95000214
- Added to NRHP: March 10, 1995

Field Farm is a historic farm property on Fuller Mountain Road in Ferrisburgh, Vermont. Developed around the turn of the 19th century, the property includes an early farmhouse and barn, as well as outbuildings representative of Vermont's trends in agriculture over two centuries. The property was listed on the National Register of Historic Places in 1995.

== Description and history ==
Field Farm is located in rural eastern Ferrisburgh, on the west side of Fuller Mountain Road. The property consists of about 83 acres (34 ha), bounded on the east by Fuller Mountain Road and the north by a now-disused former town road. The eastern two-thirds of the property consists of open fields, while the western third, located across a brook that feeds Little Otter Creek, is mostly wooded. Most of the farm's buildings are located in a cluster near the road at the northeast corner of the property. The house is a 1-1/2 story Cape style structure, with a side gable roof and clapboarded exterior. It is unusual for its seven-bay width, which includes two doorways framed by Greek Revival surrounds. It has high knee walls on the upper level, a characteristic typical of early Addison County Capes. Also on the property are two English barns, one contemporaneous to the house, three smaller 19th-century outbuildings, and a 20th-century silo.

The farm is one of the original farmsteads to be developed along Fuller Mountain Road. Its original developer, Archibald Collins, acquired the property in 1787, and the farmhouse may well have been built by him around 1807. In the 1830s it was given the Greek Revival styling it now has, and it is possible the house dates to that period as well. The two-story storage barn dates to the same period as the house, while the three-story dairy barn was added about 1850, when dairy farming came into vogue.

== See also ==
- National Register of Historic Places listings in Addison County, Vermont
