= Bottum Farm =

- U.S. National Register of Historic Places
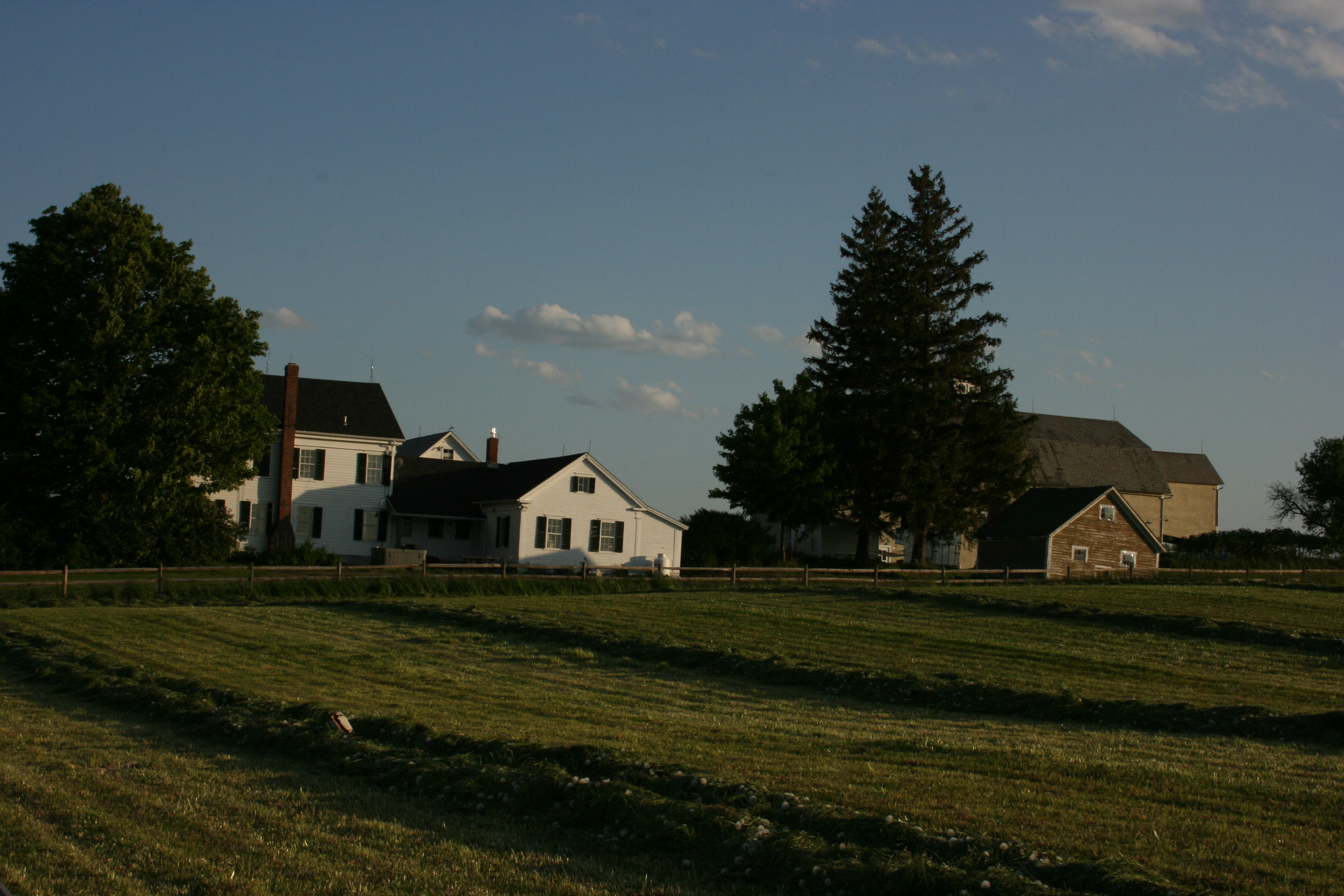

- Location within Vermont Location within the United States
- Location: 1423 North St., New Haven, Vermont
- Coordinates: 44°8′41″N 73°9′29″W
- Area: 50 acres (20 ha)
- Built: 1855
- Built by: Bottum, Simon Elias
- Architectural style: Greek Revival
- MPS: Agricultural Resources of Vermont MPS
- NRHP reference No.: 08000157
- Added to NRHP: March 7, 2008

The Bottum Farm is a historic farm property at 1423 North Street in New Haven, Vermont. With a history dating back to the early 1770s, it is one of the community's oldest farm properties, and is also significant for its association with Justus Sherwood, a major in Vermont's Revolutionary War-era history. The property, which now includes buildings dating from the mid-19th to early-20th centuries, was listed on the National Register of Historic Places in 2008.

== Description and history ==
The Bottum Farm is located in a rural area of northern New Haven, and now consists of 50 acres (20 ha) bounded on the east by North Street and the south by Quarry Road. The farm complex stands on the west side of North Street, and includes a house, dairy barn, carriage barn, garage, smithy, and granary. The house is a Greek Revival 2 1/2-story wood-frame building, with a gable roof and clapboarded exterior. Its corners are pilastered, and its entries are framed by pilasters. The interior, although somewhat altered, retains a number of original Greek Revival finishes, and many of the windows are also original, with period storm windows.

The land that became Bottum Farm was first acquire by Justus Sherwood in 1774, who purchased the land from the Onion River Company of Ira and Ethan Allen. Sherwood was a Loyalist during the American Revolution, and transferred title to the land to his in-laws, the Bottums, to avoid its confiscation after he joined the British Army. Sherwood was instrumental in organizing the town of New Haven during his relatively brief residency (two years) on the farm, and played a significant role in British conduct of the war from Quebec. The New Haven lands were the only holdings of his not confiscated by the state. The Bottums continued to farm the land until 1958.

== See also ==
- National Register of Historic Places listings in Addison County, Vermont
