= Lampson School =

- U.S. National Register of Historic Places
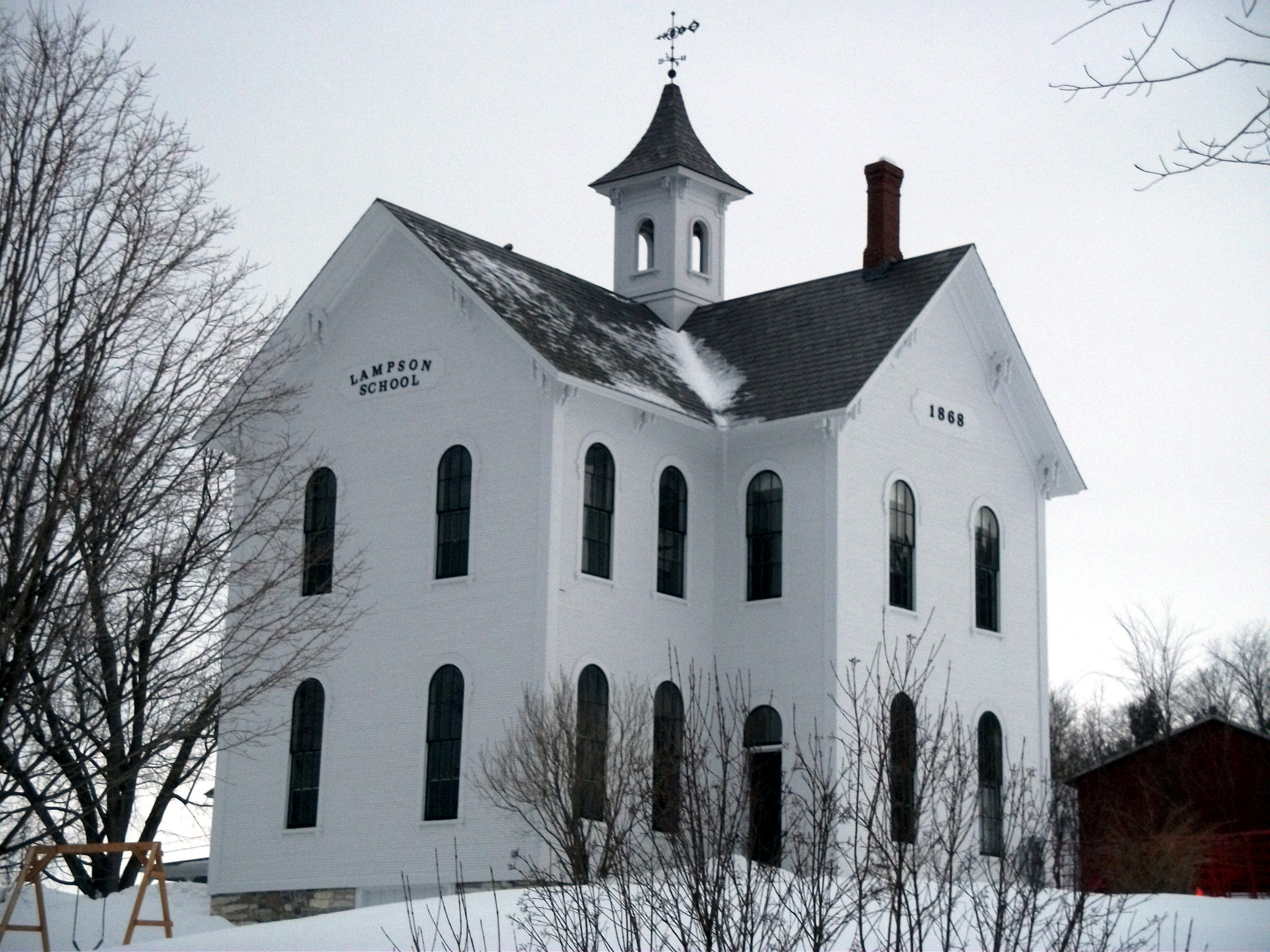

- Location within Vermont Location within the United States
- Location: 44 Sumner Rd., New Haven, Vermont
- Coordinates: 44.0918°N 73.1095°W
- Area: 2 acres (0.81 ha)
- Built: 1868
- Architectural style: Italianate
- MPS: Educational Resources of Vermont MPS
- NRHP reference No.: 01001363
- Added to NRHP: December 21, 2001

The Lampson School is a historic school building at 44 Summer Road in New Haven, Vermont. Built in 1868, it is a prominent example of Italianate architecture, donated to the town by one of its native sons, Curtis Lampson. It served as a public school until 1940, and was afterward converted to residential use. It was listed on the National Register of Historic Places in 2001.

== Description and history ==
The former Lampson School occupies a prominent site in the village of New Haven Mills, bounded on the south by Summer Road, the east by River Road, and the northeast by East Street. It is set on a rise, facing east toward River Road and the New Haven River. It is a two-story wood-frame structure, with a T-shaped footprint consisting of a north–south main block and a center projection to the east, all resting on a stone foundation and sheathed in clapboards. The roof sections are gabled, with paired brackets in the eaves, and an open cupola with round-arch openings at the center of the roof. Windows are generally tall round-topped sash, and the original main building entrances are located on the sides of the eastern projection. The interior retains most of its original materials and finishes, despite a nearly 50-year period in which some were covered by other materials.

The school was built in 1868 as a district school, and is one of Vermont's most architecturally distinguished district schools of the period. The school was funded by Sir Curtis Lampson, a native of New Haven Mills who is best known for overseeing the laying of the first transatlantic telegraph cable. The school served the community until about 1940, and was sold to a private developer in 1951. It was converted to a two-family residence, adding dropped ceilings and wall dividers that retained most of its original interior finishes. These alterations were reversed in the late 1990s.

== See also ==
- National Register of Historic Places listings in Addison County, Vermont
