= District Six Schoolhouse =

- U.S. National Register of Historic Places
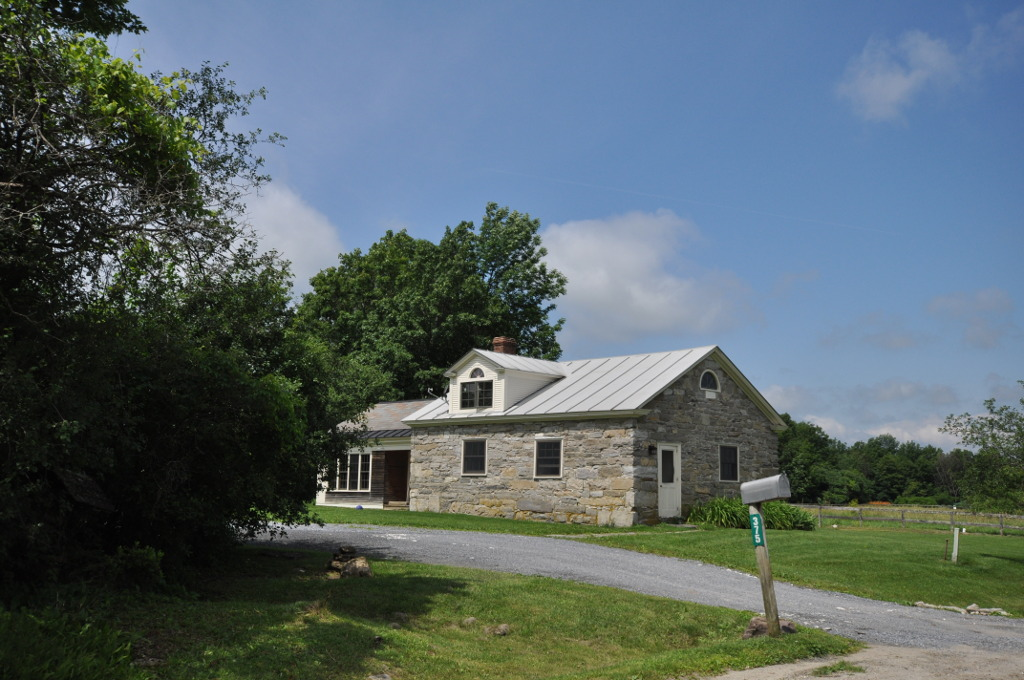

- Location within Vermont Location within the United States
- Location: Elmendorf Rd., Shoreham, Vermont
- Coordinates: 43°55′51″N 73°17′50″W
- Area: 1 acre (0.40 ha)
- Built: 1833
- Architectural style: Federal
- NRHP reference No.: 77000093
- Added to NRHP: August 18, 1977

The District Six Schoolhouse is a historic school building on Elmendorf Road in Shoreham, Vermont. Built about 1833 and now converted into a residence, this modest stone structure is one of Vermont's oldest surviving district schoolhouses. It was listed on the National Register of Historic Places in 1977.

== Description ==
The former District Six Schoolhouse stands in a rural area of northeastern Shoreham, on the southwest side of Elmendorf Road. It is a modest single-story stone structure, measuring just 20 by 25 feet (6.1 m × 7.6 m), with a gabled roof. It is built of course rubble limestone and covered by a standing seam metal roof. The street-facing facade has two bays, with the entrance in a recess on the left and a sash window on the right, and has a half-round window in the gable. The southeast roof face has a gabled wood-frame dormer, part of alterations made to convert the building to residential use. A single-story wood-frame ell extends to the rear.

The school was built in 1833 out of locally quarried limestone, and is a good example of late Federal period vernacular architecture. It is one of a number of surviving stone district schools in the region. It remained in use as a schoolhouse until the 1940s. After standing vacant for some years, it was rehabilitated and converted into a residence.

== See also ==
- National Register of Historic Places listings in Addison County, Vermont
