= Witherell Farm =

- U.S. National Register of Historic Places
- U.S. Historic district
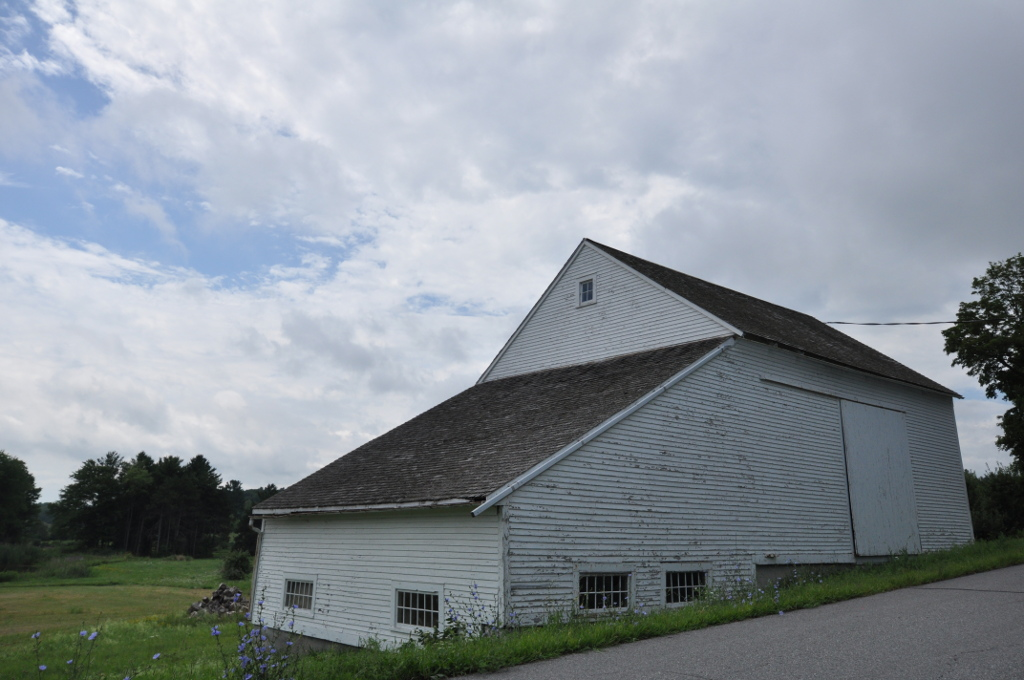
- Barns of the farm

- Location within Vermont Location within the United States
- Location: Witherill Rd., Shoreham, Vermont
- Coordinates: 43°53′8″N 73°20′23″W
- Area: 117 acres (47 ha)
- Built: 1809
- Architectural style: Greek Revival
- MPS: Agricultural Resources of Vermont MPS
- NRHP reference No.: 93000241
- Added to NRHP: April 1, 1993

The Witherell Farm is a historic farm property on Witherell Road in Shoreham, Vermont. With a history dating to the late 18th century, the farm was for two centuries managed by generations of the same family, and was a noted early exporter of merino sheep to South Africa. Most of the farmstead buildings were built before 1850. The property was listed on the National Register of Historic Places in 1993.

== Description and history ==
The Witherell Farm is located in central western Shoreham, and is roughly bisected by Witherell Road, a town road extending westward from Vermont Route 74. The farmstead consists of four buildings, two on either side of the road. To the north stands what was originally a small blacksmith shop, a 1 1/2-story gabled wood-frame structure that recently served as a garage, but has seen a variety of uses over time. East of it stands the main farmhouse, an 1857 Greek Revival structure two stories in height and three bays wide, with a wraparound single-story porch. Across the street stand two barns: a c. 1820 sheep barn, and an 1809 apple packing barn. Both have rubblestone foundations and timber framing, with clapboard walls. At the time of the property's National Register operation, most of the farm's 117 acres (47 ha) were in agricultural use as an apple orchard.

The farm's history dates to 1785, when Ebenezer Turrill purchased the land from one of Shoreham's original proprietors. His first house, built in 1790, stood about 10 feet (3.0 m) from the present farmhouse, which was built in 1857. The farm has been worked by successive generations of Turrill's descendants. Originally a diversified farm producing a variety of products, it was specialized into merino sheep farming in the late 19th century, with its sheep being among early exports to South America and South Africa, its operators making several trips to the latter area to further this trade. The Witherells were among the first in the area to produce apples for commercial distribution, acting as founding members of a local cooperative established for the purpose. As of 1993, the farm continued to be worked by the Witherells.

== See also ==
- National Register of Historic Places listings in Addison County, Vermont
