= Salisbury Town Hall =

Historic place in Salisbury, Vermont, USA

- U.S. National Register of Historic Places
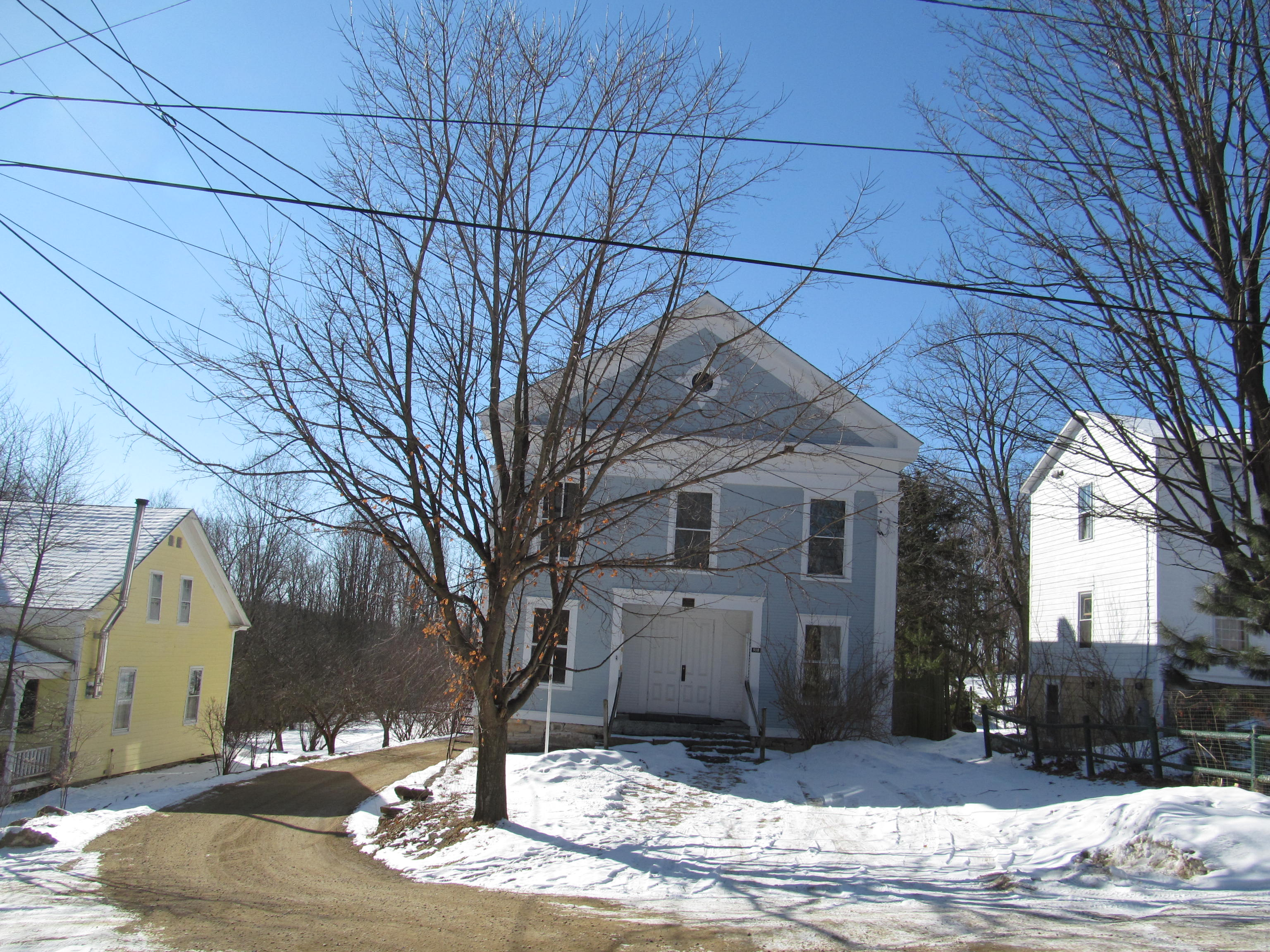

- Location within Vermont Location within the United States
- Location: West of the junction of Maple and Prospect streets, Salisbury, Vermont
- Coordinates: 43°53′46″N 73°06′06″W
- Area: less than one acre
- Built: 1869
- Architectural style: Greek Revival
- NRHP reference No.: 95001262
- Added to NRHP: November 7, 1995

Salisbury Town Hall is a historic municipal building at Maple and Prospect streets in Salisbury, Vermont. Built in 1869, it is a fine local example of Greek Revival architecture, and has served the rural community in a variety of ways: as town hall, library, and as educational facility. It was listed on the National Register of Historic Places in 1995.

== Description and history ==
The former Salisbury Town Hall stands in the rural village center of the town, at the southwest corner of Maple Run Road and Prospect Street. It is a 2 1/2-story wood-frame structure, with a gabled roof, clapboarded exterior, and marble foundation. Its front facade is distinguished by its central entrance, which is set in a deep recess taking up the central portion of the three-bay facade. The building corners have pilasters rising to a broad entablature, with a fully pedimented gable above that has an oculus window at its center. The interior of the hall is reflective of a major early 20th-century renovation, which included adding a second story. The ground floor houses what was historically office space, with an auditorium on the second floor.

The hall was built in 1869 as a single-story building. The town had decided in 1857 to build one, but was delayed in building it by the American Civil War. It underwent a major renovation in 1908, at which time the roof was raised and the second story added, and most previous interior details were lost. It underwent further work in 1948, after it was damaged by fire. In the 1970s and 1980s the building housed the public library on the ground floor, with the auditorium space on the second floor used as a gymnasium by the local school.

== See also ==
- National Register of Historic Places listings in Addison County, Vermont
