= Starksboro Village Meeting House =

Historic church in Vermont, United States

- U.S. National Register of Historic Places
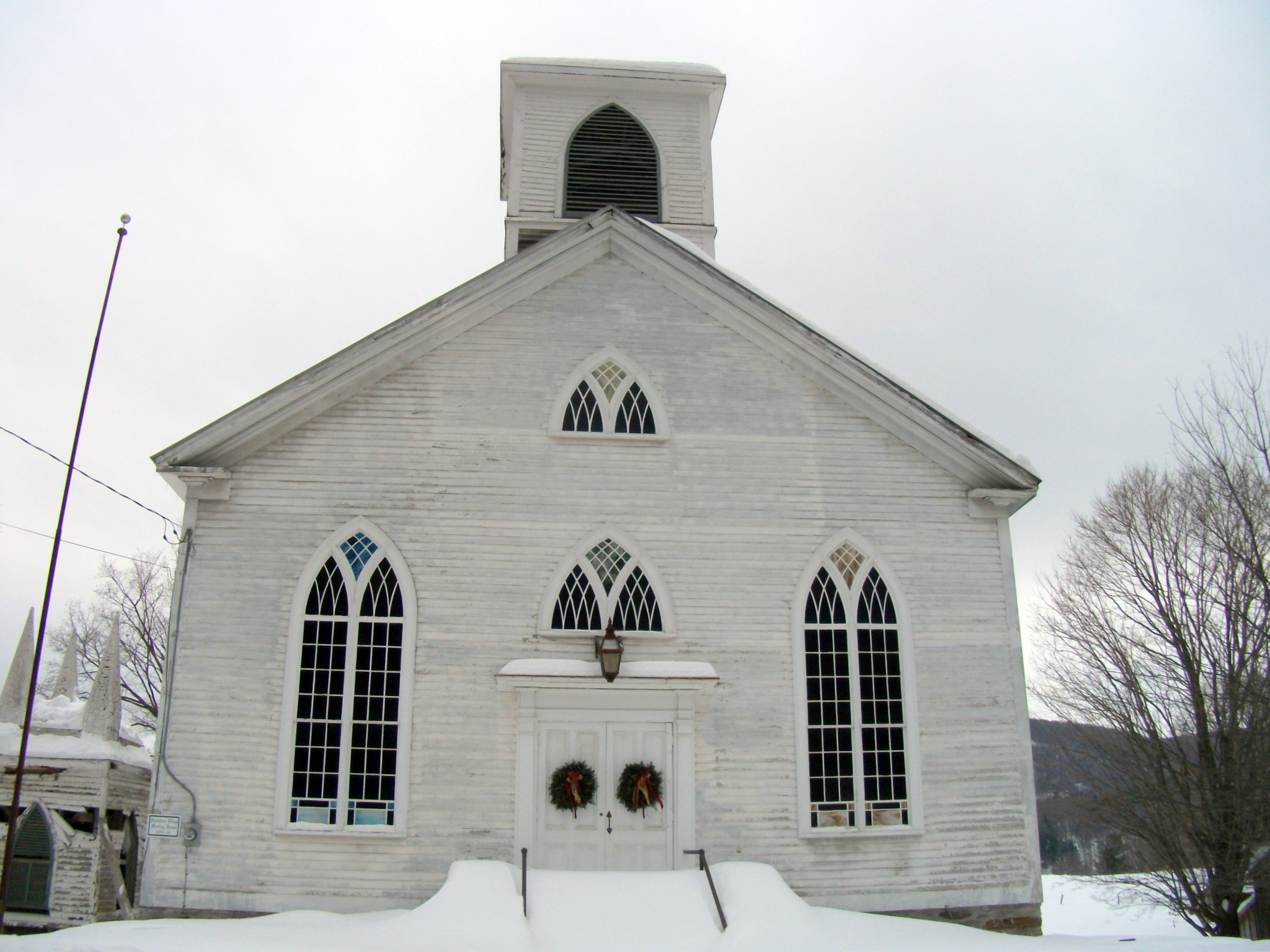
- Starksboro Village Meeting House, February 2011

- Location within Vermont Location within the United States
- Location: VT 116, Starksboro, Vermont
- Coordinates: 44°13′32″N 73°3′28″W
- Area: 0.3 acres (0.12 ha)
- Built: 1838
- Architectural style: Gothic Revival
- NRHP reference No.: 85002768
- Added to NRHP: November 07, 1985

The Starksboro Village Meeting House is a historic church and town hall on Vermont Route 116 in the village center of Starksboro, Vermont. It was built in 1838 as a cooperative venture between three church congregations and the town, and is a fine local example of Gothic Revival architecture. It was listed on the National Register of Historic Places in 1985.

== Description and history ==
The Starksboro Village Meeting House is located near the center of Starksboro Village, on the west side of Vermont 116 a short way south of its junction with Big Hollow Road. It is a single-story rectangular wood-frame structure, with a gabled roof, clapboarded exterior, and a high stone foundation. A two-stage belltower rises above the roof ridgeline, with corner pinnacles at the top. The main facade is symmetrical, with tall Gothic-arched windows flanking the main entrance, which is itself topped by a Gothic-pointed window. A smaller arched window is set in the gable above. The entrance is framed by simple Greek Revival styling. The interior has an entry vestibule leading into the sanctuary, which is finished in plaster with simple vertical wainscoting. A kerosene-powered chandelier hangs at the center of the sanctuary. The basement of the building, originally one large space used for town meetings, has been divided into two, but retains many original features.

Prior to the construction of this building, Starksboro's town meetings were generally held in the village schoolhouse. Three church congregations, Methodist, Free Will Baptist, and Christian, each typically met in the homes of their members. In 1838 these groups came together and agreed on the construction of this building, which was completed in 1840. In 1868, the Free Will Baptists built their own church on the south side of the village, and the Christian dwindled and eventually died out, leaving the Methodists as the sole religious occupants. The town moved its offices and facilities into a new town hall (the present one) in 1910, and the Methodist formed a new union with the Free Will Baptists, using the larger edifice of the latter. This building then stood largely unused, with occasional use for community functions and services. Beginning in 1957 it has been maintained by the Starksboro Village Meeting House Society.

== See also ==
- National Register of Historic Places listings in Addison County, Vermont
