= Vergennes Residential Historic District =

Historic district in Vermont, United States

- U.S. National Register of Historic Places
- U.S. Historic district
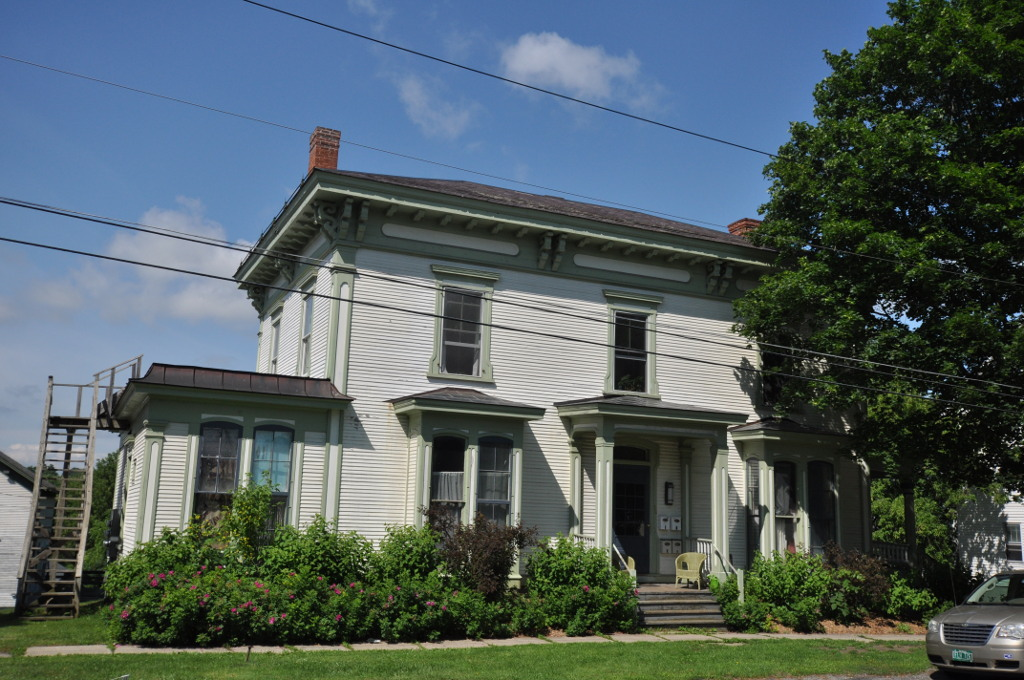

- Location within Vermont Location within the United States
- Location: S. Water St., Green St., S. Maple St.-S of Main St., Vergennes, Vermont
- Coordinates: 44°9′57″N 73°15′9″W
- Area: 10 acres (4.0 ha)
- Built: 1823
- Architectural style: Federal, Greek Revival, et al.
- NRHP reference No.: 03000395
- Added to NRHP: May 8, 2003

The Vergennes Residential Historic District encompasses a neighborhood south of downtown Vergennes, Vermont that encapsulates an architectural cross-section of the city's 19th and early 20th-century residential history. Set on Water, Maple, and Green Streets, it includes houses built and occupied by a diversity of the city's economic classes, from mill owners to laborers. The district was listed on the National Register of Historic Places in 2003.

== Description and history ==
The city of Vergennes was first settled in the 1760s, but only began significant growth in the 1780s, when it became one of Vermont's early industrial centers. The city is located at a bend in Otter Creek where there is a 37-foot (11 m) falls that could be harnessed for water power, and it also benefited by its location as the crossing point of two major stagecoach routes. It was incorporated as a city in 1788. Sawmills, gristmills, and later other types of industry were all powered by the waters of the creek, and the city experienced growth through the 19th century. The area south of the Main Street business district developed during this period as a residential neighborhood, housing an economic and stylistic diversity of buildings. There are a significant number of Greek Revival and Italianate houses, mainly vernacular in style, and many with later Victorian embellishments. The district is also home to two churches, the Congregational Church and St. Peter's Catholic Church, the latter a particularly prominent High Gothic brick building.

The district extends to the south along three roads perpendicular to Main Street: Water Street, Maple Street, and Green Street. It extends along Water Street nearly to Roberts Street, along Maple to a point about halfway between King and Victory Streets, and along Green to King Street. It includes buildings on the cross streets between these streets, and excludes buildings facing Main Street.

== See also ==
- National Register of Historic Places listings in Addison County, Vermont
