= Fenn Farm =

- U.S. National Register of Historic Places
- U.S. Historic district
- Location within Vermont Location within the United States
- Location: VT 116 (Case St.), W side, Middlebury, Vermont
- Coordinates: 43°58′46″N 73°6′16″W
- Area: 94 acres (38 ha)
- Built: 1828
- MPS: Agricultural Resources of Vermont MPS
- NRHP reference No.: 94001518
- Added to NRHP: January 6, 1995

Fenn Farm is a historic property on Case Street in Middlebury, Vermont. Developed c. 1828 as a sheep farm but now diversified, it now includes a well-preserved collection of mid-19th century farm buildings. It was listed on the National Register of Historic Places in 1995.

== Description and history ==
Fenn Farm is located in rural eastern Middlebury, on about 100 acres (40 ha) of land laid out in a relatively narrow strip on either side of Case Street (Vermont Route 116). The landscape consists of rolling hills, divided into a combination of uses, including pasture, agriculture, and woodland. The farm buildings are set in a cluster on the west side of the road. The oldest portion of the farmhouse is a 1 1/2-story Cape style three-bay wood-frame structure, built by 1840 (and possibly as early as 1828), with a series of additions to the rear. Farm buildings from the 19th century include a c. 1860 horse barn and granary, and a c. 1880 piggery. Twentieth-century buildings include a hen house, milk house, and circular silo.

Land for the farm was first cleared about 1828 by Silas Torrance, who engaged in the raising of sheep. By 1850, the property was owned by Daniel Sessions, and the farm was more diversified, producing grain and dairy products in addition to wool. In 1854 the property was acquired by James Fenn, and it has remained in the hands of his descendants since then. Emphasis on dairy production increased significantly in the early 20th century, and chicken and egg production was furthered by the construction of the hen house in the 1980s.

== See also ==
- National Register of Historic Places listings in Addison County, Vermont
