= Halpin Covered Bridge =

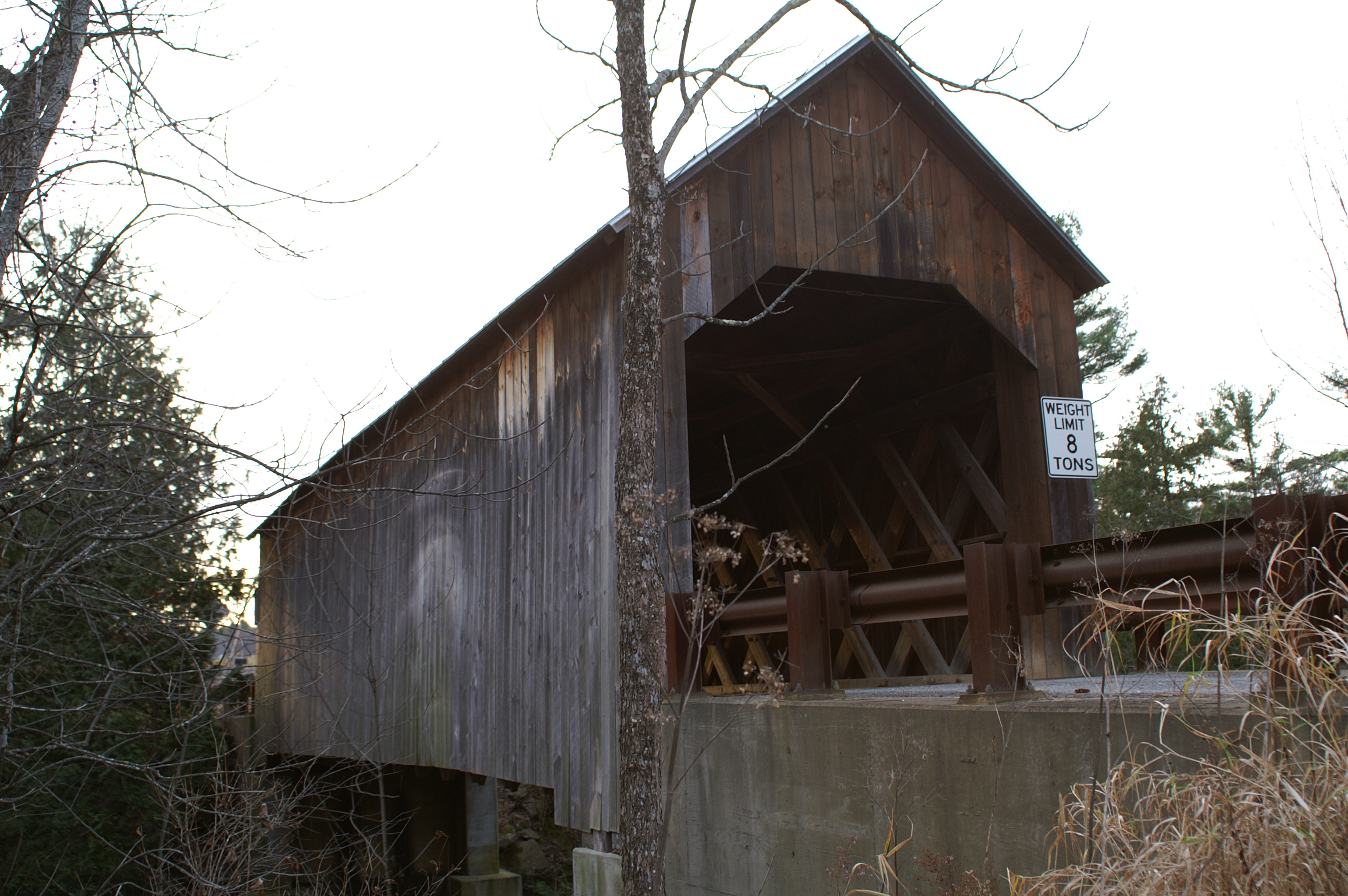
- Coordinates: 44°03′00″N 73°08′28″W
- Carries: Automobile
- Crosses: Muddy Branch of New Haven River
- Locale: Middlebury, Vermont
- Maintained by: Town of Middlebury
- ID number: VT-01-03

Characteristics
- Design: Covered, Town lattice
- Material: Wood
- Total length: 66.25 ft (20.19 m)
- Width: 11.9 ft (3.63 m)
- No. of spans: 1
- Load limit: 8 tons
- Clearance above: 9.75 ft (2.97 m)

History
- Constructed by: unknown
- Construction end: 1850
- Halpin Covered Bridge
- U.S. National Register of Historic Places
- Location within Vermont Location within the United States
- Coordinates: 44°3′0″N 73°08′28″W
- Area: 1 acre (0.40 ha)
- NRHP reference No.: 74000199
- Added to NRHP: September 10, 1974

The Halpin Covered Bridge, also called the High Covered Bridge, is a wooden covered bridge carrying Halpin Bridge Road across the Muddy Branch of the New Haven River in Middlebury, Vermont. It was listed on the National Register of Historic Places in 1974.

== Description and history ==
The Halpin Covered Bridge is located in a rural area of northern Middlebury, near or on the border with neighboring New Haven on Halpin Bridge Road, a dead-end road off Halpin Road. The bridge spans a gorge carrying the Muddy Branch of the New Haven River, and now provides access only to the Halpin family farm. It is a single-span Town lattice truss, 66 feet (20 m) long, resting on concrete abutments. Its total width is 16 feet (4.9 m), with a roadway width of 12 feet 5 inches (3.78 m) (one lane). The bridge stands 41 feet (12.5 m) above the water, making it the highest covered bridge in the state.

The bridge was originally built to serve a marble quarry operation on the east side of the river, and had dry laid stone abutments. It is one of only two covered bridges in Middlebury. It had minor repairs made in the 1960s. In 1994 the bridge had extensive work done by Jan Lewandoski, in which the bridge was completely removed from its crumbling marble abutments, and new concrete abutments were created for it.

== See also ==
- National Register of Historic Places listings in Addison County, Vermont
- List of Vermont covered bridges
- List of bridges on the National Register of Historic Places in Vermont
