= Union Church (New Haven, Vermont) =

Historic church in Vermont, United States

- U.S. National Register of Historic Places
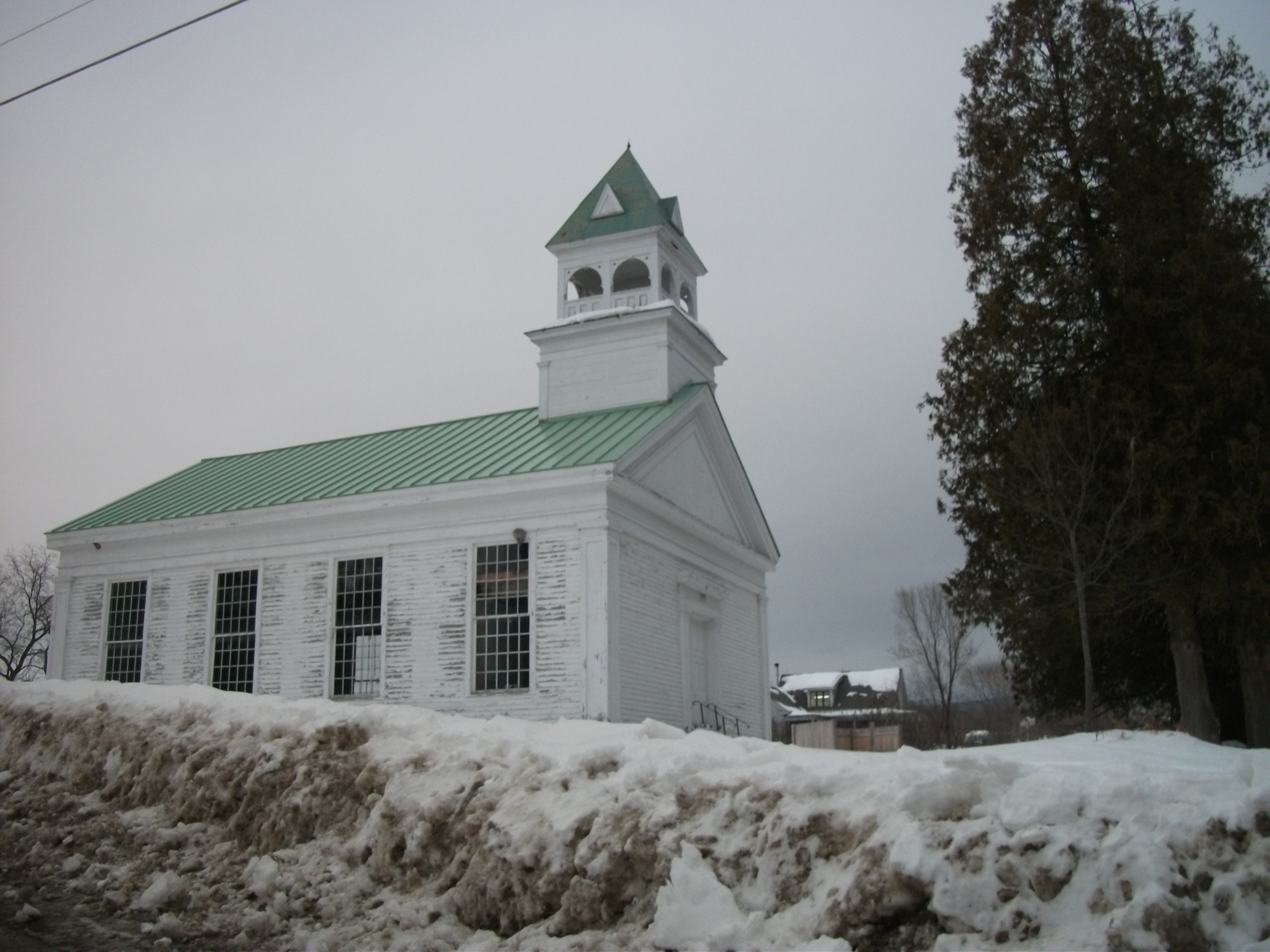

- Location within Vermont Location within the United States
- Location: Jct. of River Rd. and East St., New Haven, Vermont
- Coordinates: 44°5′33″N 73°6′34″W
- Area: 1.2 acres (0.49 ha)
- Built: 1851
- Architect: Case, Eastman
- Architectural style: Greek Revival
- NRHP reference No.: 00000829
- Added to NRHP: July 20, 2000

Union Church, also known as the Union Church of New Haven Mills, is a historic church at the junction of River Rd. and East Street in New Haven, Vermont. Built in 1851, it is a fine local example of Greek Revival architecture with added Queen Anne Victorian features, and one of the oldest surviving buildings in a once-thriving mill village. It was listed on the National Register of Historic Places in 2000.

== Description and history ==
The Union Church stands prominently at the center of the village of New Haven Mills in central-eastern New Haven, a now-rural village with a modest industrial past. It is a single-story rectangular wood-frame structure, with a gabled roof and clapboarded exterior. A modest square tower, with open belfry and pyramidal roof, rises above the roof. The building corners have pilasters, which rise to an encircling entablature and a fully pedimented gable on the front facade. The front facade is unadorned except for the centered main entrance, which is in a slight recess flanked by pilasters and topped by a corniced entablature. The interior of the sanctuary has rows of original bench pews, and its only illumination is from original kerosene lamps. It has a pressed metal ceiling dating to the late 19th century.

The church was built in 1851 for a congregation established in 1797, which met in a variety of spaces prior to the construction of this building. The village was by the 1840s a thriving industrial center, with the New Haven River lined with sawmills, gristmills, and other industry. The church was built by Eastman Case, a local master builder, and its elements are designed in part on similar features found in other regional churches, and in part from designs published by Asher Benjamin. Most of New Haven Mills' industrial and commercial buildings were destroyed by fires and flooding in the early 20th century, leaving the church as one of its most prominent surviving landmarks.

== See also ==
- National Register of Historic Places listings in Addison County, Vermont
