= National Register of Historic Places listings in Addison County, Vermont =

Location of Addison County in Vermont

This is a list of the National Register of Historic Places listings in Addison County, Vermont.

This is intended to be a complete list of the properties and districts on the National Register of Historic Places in Addison County, Vermont, United States. Latitude and longitude coordinates are provided for many National Register properties and districts; these locations may be seen together in a map.

There are 73 properties and districts listed on the National Register in the county, including 4 National Historic Landmarks. Two properties were once listed, but have been removed.

This National Park Service list is complete through NPS recent listings posted April 24, 2026.

Contents: Counties in Vermont
Addison - Bennington - Caledonia - Chittenden - Essex - Franklin - Grand Isle - Lamoille - Orange - Orleans - Rutland - Washington - Windham - Windsor

== Current listings ==
	Name on the Register	Image	Date listed	Location	City or town	Description
1	Addison Baptist Church	Addison Baptist Church	November 2, 1978 (#78003202)	Junction of VT 22A and VT 17; 44°05′19″N 73°18′10″W	Addison	
2	Addison Town Hall	Addison Town Hall	April 6, 2022 (#100007574)	4970 VT 22A; 44°05′20″N 73°18′09″W	Addison	
3	Bottum Farm	Bottum Farm	March 7, 2008 (#08000157)	1423 North St. 44°08′41″N 73°09′29″W	New Haven	
4	Bridge 26	Bridge 26	June 7, 2006 (#06000488)	Town Highway 11, Morgan Horse Farm Rd., over Otter Creek; 44°04′23″N 73°11′39″W	Weybridge	
5	Bristol Downtown Historic District	Bristol Downtown Historic District	February 3, 1983 (#83003203)	Main St. 44°07′57″N 73°04′40″W	Bristol	
6	Camp Marbury Historic District		December 6, 2018 (#100003222)	243, 245 & 293 Mile Point Rd. 44°11′59″N 73°21′26″W	Ferrisburgh	
7	Cedar Swamp Covered Bridge	Cedar Swamp Covered Bridge	September 10, 1974 (#74000386)	West of West Salisbury over Otter Creek; 43°55′06″N 73°10′28″W	West Salisbury	
8	Chimney Point Tavern	Chimney Point Tavern	March 31, 1971 (#71000073)	VT 125; 44°02′04″N 73°25′18″W	Addison	
9	Chipman's Point	Chipman's Point	December 26, 1996 (#96001519)	Chipman Point Rd. 43°47′59″N 73°22′32″W	Orwell	
10	Cornwall General Store	Cornwall General Store	August 6, 2005 (#05000804)	2635 VT 30, Seth Warner Highway; 43°57′40″N 73°12′34″W	Cornwall	Demolished c. 2013.
11	Cornwall Town Hall	Cornwall Town Hall	May 8, 1986 (#86001035)	VT 30; 43°57′41″N 73°12′52″W	Cornwall	
12	Cotton Free Library	Cotton Free Library	April 4, 1996 (#96000388)	Quaker Village Rd., near the junction of Baker Ct. and Quaker Village Rd. 44°03′54″N 73°12′57″W	Weybridge	
13	Capts. Louis and Philomene Daniels House	Capts. Louis and Philomene Daniels House	July 11, 2001 (#01000733)	50 Macdonough Dr. 44°10′12″N 73°15′28″W	Vergennes	
14	District School No. 1	District School No. 1	April 17, 1980 (#80000323)	Lake Rd. 44°07′37″N 73°21′53″W	Panton	
15	District Six Schoolhouse	District Six Schoolhouse	August 18, 1977 (#77000093)	Elmendorf Road; 43°55′52″N 73°17′48″W	Shoreham	
16	Colonel Ephraim and Sarah Doolittle Farm	Colonel Ephraim and Sarah Doolittle Farm	January 6, 1995 (#94001523)	1 mi (1.6 km) east of VT 22A on Doolittle Rd. 43°56′19″N 73°18′16″W	Shoreham	
17	East Monkton Church		March 1, 2023 (#100008689)	405 Church Rd. 44°12′17″N 73°06′35″W	Monkton	
18	East Shoreham Covered Railroad Bridge	East Shoreham Covered Railroad Bridge	June 13, 1974 (#74000198)	Southeast of Shoreham over the Lemon Fair River; 43°51′33″N 73°15′22″W	Shoreham	
19	Fenn Farm		January 6, 1995 (#94001518)	Western side of VT 116 (Case St.); 43°58′46″N 73°06′16″W	Middlebury	
20	Field Farm	Field Farm	March 10, 1995 (#95000214)	Fuller Mountain Rd. 44°13′34″N 73°11′56″W	Ferrisburgh	
21	First Congregational Church	First Congregational Church	March 2, 2001 (#01000210)	464 Main St. 43°48′15″N 73°18′03″W	Orwell	
22	First Congregational Church of Cornwall Parsonage	First Congregational Church of Cornwall Parsonage	June 29, 2015 (#15000376)	18 VT 74; 43°57′39″N 73°12′36″W	Cornwall	
23	Paris and Anna Fletcher House	Paris and Anna Fletcher House	February 12, 1999 (#99000218)	VT 22A, north of its junction with Middle Rd. 43°59′07″N 73°18′48″W	Bridport	
24	Robert Frost Farm	Robert Frost Farm	May 23, 1968 (#68000046)	1 mi (1.6 km) north of VT 125, 3 mi (4.8 km) east of Ripton; 43°58′08″N 72°59′49″W	Ripton	Homestead of author Robert Frost; now owned by Middlebury College.
25	Glen Dale	Glen Dale	July 11, 2002 (#02000776)	1455 Cider Mill Rd. 44°00′10″N 73°12′34″W	Cornwall	
26	Halpin Covered Bridge	Halpin Covered Bridge	September 10, 1974 (#74000199)	Northeast of Middlebury; 44°03′00″N 73°08′28″W	Middlebury	
27	John Hamilton Farmstead	John Hamilton Farmstead	June 17, 1993 (#93000531)	VT 125 west of the Lemon Fair River; 43°59′18″N 73°16′33″W	Bridport	
28	Hand's Cove	Hand's Cove	May 22, 1980 (#80000324)	Southwest of Shoreham on Hands Cove Rd. 43°52′02″N 73°21′56″W	Shoreham	
29	Hawley's Ferry House	Hawley's Ferry House	November 2, 1978 (#78000224)	Northwest of Ferrisburg on Kingsland Bay; 44°14′26″N 73°17′52″W	Ferrisburg	
30	The Heights	The Heights	December 29, 1988 (#88003082)	South St./VT 30; 44°00′18″N 73°10′54″W	Middlebury	Also known as Thaddeus Chapman House
31	Hoag Gristmill and Knight House Complex	Hoag Gristmill and Knight House Complex	April 22, 1980 (#80000325)	Northwest of Starksboro on State Prison Hollow Rd. 44°14′37″N 73°04′08″W	Starksboro	
32	House at 215 School Street	House at 215 School Street	December 16, 2005 (#05001423)	215 School St. 43°53′33″N 73°18′55″W	Shoreham	
33	Lampson School	Lampson School	December 21, 2001 (#01001363)	44 Sumner Rd. 44°05′30″N 73°06′34″W	New Haven	
34	Larrabee's Point Complex	Larrabee's Point Complex	May 1, 1980 (#80000423)	Southwest of Shoreham; 43°51′20″N 73°22′36″W	Shoreham	
35	Leicester Meeting House	Leicester Meeting House	July 28, 1988 (#88001043)	U.S. Route 7 and Town Highway 1; 43°51′58″N 73°06′32″W	Leicester	
36	Middlebury Gorge Concrete Arch Bridge	Middlebury Gorge Concrete Arch Bridge	November 14, 1991 (#91001604)	Vermont 125 over the Middlebury River; 43°58′12″N 73°05′11″W	East Middlebury	
37	Middlebury Village Historic District	Middlebury Village Historic District	November 13, 1976 (#76000223)	U.S. Route 7; also VT 30 and VT 125; also roughly inclusive of Weybridge, Seymour, North Pleasant, Seminary, Washington, Court, South, South Main, and College Sts; 44°00′51″N 73°10′04″W	Middlebury	Second and third sets of addresses represent boundary increases.
38	Monkton Borough Baptist Church	Monkton Borough Baptist Church	January 5, 1989 (#88003121)	Town Highway 1 (Monkton Rd.); 44°14′18″N 73°08′42″W	Monkton	Now used as a Grange hall.
39	Monkton Town Hall	Monkton Town Hall	January 3, 1978 (#78000225)	North of Monkton on Monkton Ridge Rd. 44°15′13″N 73°07′30″W	Monkton	
40	Mount Independence	Mount Independence	September 3, 1971 (#71000079)	On Lake Champlain opposite Fort Ticonderoga, northwest of Orwell; 43°49′33″N 73°23′02″W	Orwell	Site of Fort Independence, an American Revolutionary War fortification built opposite Fort Ticonderoga.
41	New Haven Junction Depot	New Haven Junction Depot	October 19, 1978 (#78000226)	North St. next to the library 44°07′36″N 73°09′14″W	New Haven	
42	Old Stone Blacksmith Shop	Old Stone Blacksmith Shop	April 21, 1975 (#75000136)	North of Cornwall on VT 30; 43°58′39″N 73°12′21″W	Cornwall	
43	Orwell Site	Orwell Site	April 11, 1977 (#77000094)	Address Restricted	Orwell	
44	Pulp Mill Covered Bridge	Pulp Mill Covered Bridge	September 10, 1974 (#74000200)	Northwest of Middlebury off VT 23; 44°01′29″N 73°10′41″W	Middlebury	
45	Ripton Community House	Ripton Community House	July 3, 1973 (#73000180)	On VT 125; 43°58′30″N 73°02′14″W	Ripton	
46	Rokeby	Rokeby	June 20, 1974 (#74000201)	North of Ferrisburg off U.S. Route 7; 44°13′21″N 73°14′17″W	Ferrisburg	Robinson family farmstead significant for its role in the Underground Railroad
47	Salisbury Congregational Church	Salisbury Congregational Church	March 2, 2001 (#01000212)	West Salisbury Rd. 43°53′49″N 73°06′10″W	Salisbury	
48	Salisbury Fish Hatchery	Salisbury Fish Hatchery	March 24, 1994 (#94000176)	VT 53, southeast of its junction with Smead Rd. 43°55′29″N 73°05′47″W	Salisbury	
49	Salisbury Town Hall	Salisbury Town Hall	November 7, 1995 (#95001262)	West of the junction of Maple and Prospect Sts. 43°53′46″N 73°06′08″W	Salisbury	
50	Salisbury Village Blacksmith Shop		December 9, 2020 (#100005912)	925 Maple St. 43°53′47″N 73°06′05″W	Salisbury	
51	School House and Town Hall	School House and Town Hall	June 14, 1988 (#88001045)	U.S. Route 7 and Town Highway 1; 43°51′58″N 73°06′33″W	Leicester	
52	Shard Villa	Shard Villa	October 30, 1989 (#89001789)	Junction of Shard Villa and Columbus Smith Rds. 43°56′22″N 73°09′13″W	Salisbury	
53	Shoreham Congregational Church	Shoreham Congregational Church	March 2, 2001 (#01000211)	School St. 43°53′36″N 73°18′59″W	Shoreham	
54	South Starksboro Friends Meeting House and Cemetery	South Starksboro Friends Meeting House and Cemetery	November 7, 1985 (#85002769)	Dan Sargent Rd. 44°10′02″N 73°00′53″W	Starksboro	
55	Stagecoach Inn	Stagecoach Inn	November 15, 1984 (#84000674)	U.S. Route 7; 43°51′57″N 73°06′27″W	Leicester	
56	Starksboro Village Meeting House	Starksboro Village Meeting House	November 7, 1985 (#85002768)	VT 116; 44°13′32″N 73°03′28″W	Starksboro Village	
57	Ruth Stone House	Ruth Stone House	November 22, 2016 (#16000791)	788 Hathaway Rd. 43°51′12″N 72°59′55″W	Goshen	
58	Stone Mill	Stone Mill	April 11, 1973 (#73000181)	Mill St. 44°01′05″N 73°10′15″W	Middlebury	
59	Old Stone Row	Old Stone Row	September 18, 1997 (#97001162)	Junction of S. Main St. and Old Chapel Rd. 44°00′32″N 73°10′34″W	Middlebury	
60	Gen. Samuel Strong House	Gen. Samuel Strong House	April 11, 1973 (#73000182)	64 W. Main St. 44°09′50″N 73°15′30″W	Vergennes	
61	John Strong House	John Strong House	May 15, 1980 (#80000326)	6656 VT 17; 44°03′17″N 73°24′43″W	Addison	Surrounded by D.A.R. State Park; itself a historic house museum.
62	Samuel Paddock Strong House	Samuel Paddock Strong House	August 15, 1979 (#79000216)	82 W. Main St. 44°09′41″N 73°15′41″W	Vergennes	
63	Union Church	Union Church	July 20, 2000 (#00000829)	Junction of River Rd. and East St. 44°05′33″N 73°06′34″W	New Haven	
64	Union Meetinghouse	Union Meetinghouse	February 23, 1978 (#78000227)	U.S. Route 7; 44°12′22″N 73°14′45″W	Ferrisburg	
65	University of Vermont Morgan Horse Farm	University of Vermont Morgan Horse Farm	April 11, 1973 (#73000183)	Mogan Horse Farm Rd., off U.S. Route 7; 44°02′40″N 73°11′10″W	Weybridge	
66	Vergennes Historic District	Vergennes Historic District	September 3, 1976 (#76000136)	U.S. Route 7 (at time of listing, now Vermont Route 22A); 44°10′07″N 73°15′15″W	Vergennes	
67	Vergennes Residential Historic District	Vergennes Residential Historic District	May 8, 2003 (#03000395)	S. Water St., Green St., S. Maple St., all south of Main St. 44°09′57″N 73°15′09″W	Vergennes	
68	Vergennes Station House	Vergennes Station House	May 28, 2021 (#100006640)	572 VT 22A; 44°10′51″N 73°14′56″W	Ferrisburgh	
69	Waybury Inn	Waybury Inn	July 14, 1983 (#83003204)	VT 125; 43°58′19″N 73°05′35″W	East Middlebury	
70	Wesleyan Methodist Church	Wesleyan Methodist Church	April 12, 1996 (#96000387)	Quaker Village Rd., near the junction of Baker Ct. and Quaker Village Rd. 44°03′53″N 73°12′57″W	Weybridge	
71	Wilcox-Cutts House	Wilcox-Cutts House	December 2, 1974 (#74000202)	2 mi (3.2 km) south of Orwell on VT 22A; 43°47′05″N 73°18′29″W	Orwell	
72	Emma Willard House	Emma Willard House	October 15, 1966 (#66000798)	Middlebury College campus 44°00′27″N 73°10′29″W	Middlebury	Home of Emma Willard, pioneer in women's education in the United States
73	Witherell Farm	Witherell Farm	April 1, 1993 (#93000241)	Town Highway 74 (Witherell Rd.) west of Lakeview and St. Genevieve cemeteries 43°53′02″N 73°20′23″W	Shoreham	

== Former listings ==
	Name on the Register	Image	Date listed	Date removed	Location	City or town	Description
1	Brooksville Advent Church	Brooksville Advent Church	November 21, 2002 (#02001380)	March 22, 2016	1338 Dog Team Tavern Rd. 44°03′53″N 73°10′23″W	New Haven	
2	Dog Team Tavern		November 21, 2002 (#02001381)	March 22, 2016	1338 Dog Team Tavern Rd. 44°03′51″N 73°10′24″W	New Haven	Destroyed by fire in 2006 when the final owner set the building on fire and committed suicide there.

== See also ==
- List of National Historic Landmarks in Vermont
- National Register of Historic Places listings in Vermont
