= Leicester Meeting House =

Historic church in Vermont, United States

- U.S. National Register of Historic Places
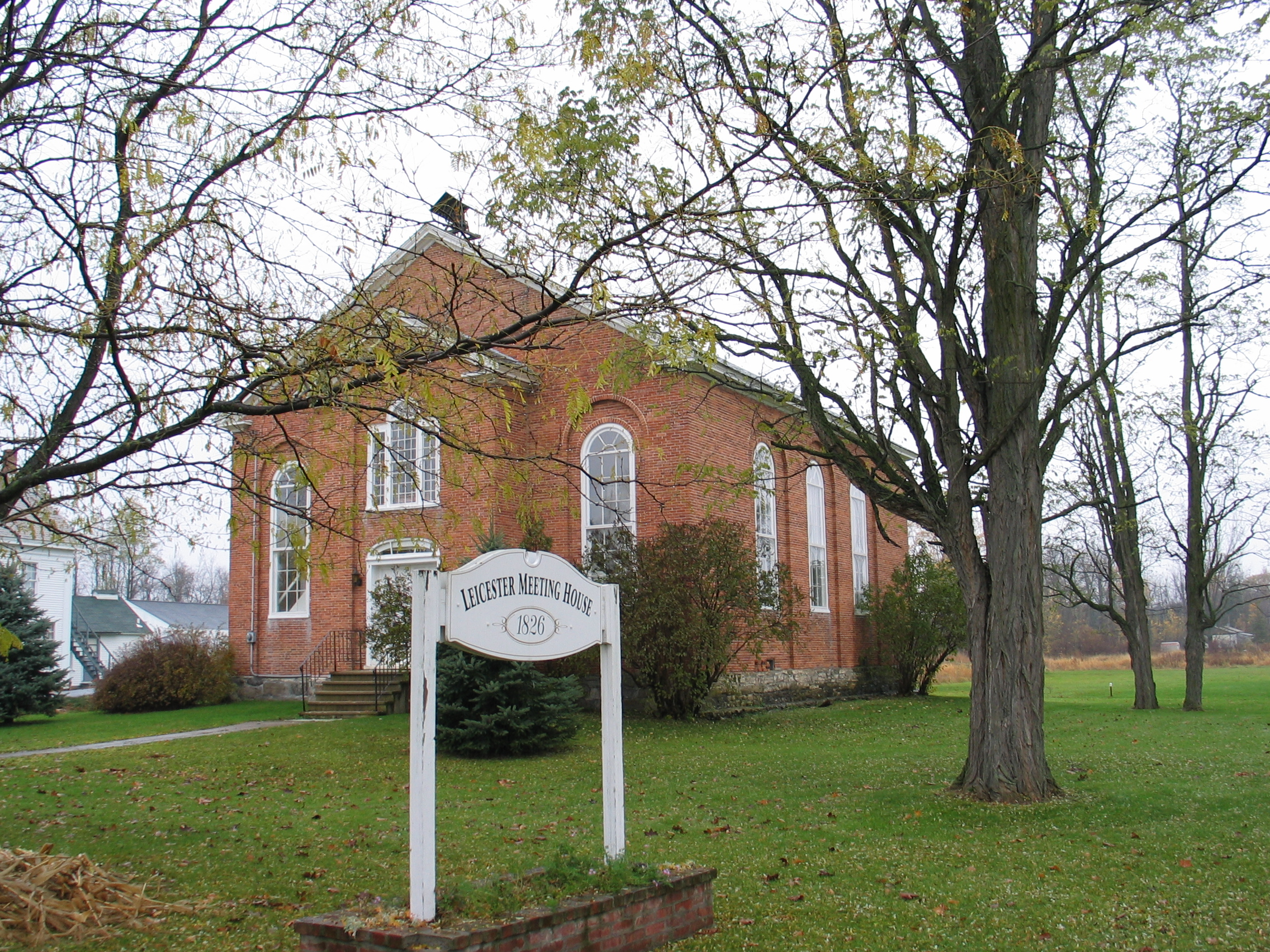

- Location within Vermont Location within the United States
- Location: US 7 and Town Hwy. 1 (Leicester-Whiting Rd.), Leicester, Vermont
- Coordinates: 43°51′58″N 73°6′32″W
- Area: 0.3 acres (0.12 ha)
- Built: 1829
- Architectural style: Federal
- NRHP reference No.: 88001043
- Added to NRHP: July 28, 1988

The Leicester Meeting House is a historic church building at the junction of United States Route 7 and the Leicester-Whiting Road in the center of Leicester, Vermont. Built in 1829, it is a well-preserved example of vernacular Federal period church architecture executed in brick. It was listed on the National Register of Historic Places in 1988.

== Description and history ==
The Leicester Meeting House is the most prominent structure in the rural community of Leicester's town center, located in what is known locally at Four Corners, the junction of US 7 with the Leicester-Whiting Road and Fern Lake Road. It is a single-story brick building, covered by a gabled roof and resting on a rustically cut stone foundation. It is three bays wide and three deep, with tall round-top sash windows set in round-arch recesses. The main entrance is in the center bay of the south-facing front facade, which projects about 4 feet (1.2 m) forward and has a gabled roof. The double-leaf doorway is topped by a shallow arched transom window, and there is a Palladian window above; both the doorway and window are set in a shallow arched recess.

The church was built in 1829 by the Leicester Meeting House Society, formed in 1825 to provide a church meeting space for multiple Christian congregations. The brick was locally sourced, apparently made from clay sources about 0.5 miles (0.80 km) away. The only major alteration to the building has been in its interior, which was originally built with the pulpit at the south end, in a semicircular niche below the gallery. In 1869, the society voted to move the pulpit to the north wall, where it stands on a raised platform. The church has served many different denominations over the years, including Methodists, Congregationalists, Pentecostals, and the Church of the Nazarene.

== See also ==
- National Register of Historic Places listings in Addison County, Vermont
