= District School No. 1 (Panton, Vermont) =

- U.S. National Register of Historic Places
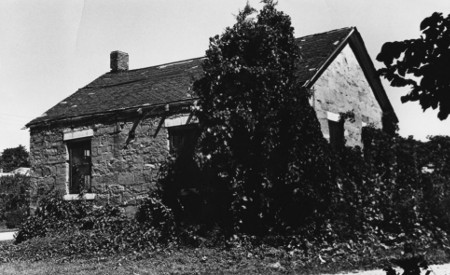

- Location within Vermont Location within the United States
- Location: Lake Rd., Panton, Vermont
- Coordinates: 44°7′37″N 73°21′53″W
- Area: 0.3 acres (0.12 ha)
- Built: 1818
- NRHP reference No.: 80000323
- Added to NRHP: April 17, 1980

The District School No. 1 is a historic one-room schoolhouse on Lake Road in Panton, Vermont. Built about 1818, the stone building is one of Vermont's oldest district schoolhouses. It was listed on the National Register of Historic Places in 1980.

== Description and history ==
Panton's former district 1 schoolhouse stands at the junction of Lake and Spaulding Roads in the rural western portion of the town. It is a single-story structure, built out of locally quarried limestone. It measures 25 by 31 feet (7.6 m × 9.4 m), and is covered by a gabled roof. The window bays have tooled white marble sills and lintels, which contrast with the roughly finished gray stone walls. Triangular marble stones are also set at the peak of each gable. The interior of the building is a large single chamber, which has been much altered due to its 20th-century use as a chicken coop.

The school was built about 1818, the year the town divided its territory into four school districts. This school and the other district schools were built out of limestone quarried from outcrops found on the west side of Dead Creek. The school saw regular use into the first quarter of the 20th century, and was sold in 1932 to a local farmer. He converted it into a chicken coop. At the time of its listing on the National Register in 1980, it was vacant and in dilapidated condition.

== See also ==
- National Register of Historic Places listings in Addison County, Vermont
