= Cornwall Town Hall =

- U.S. National Register of Historic Places
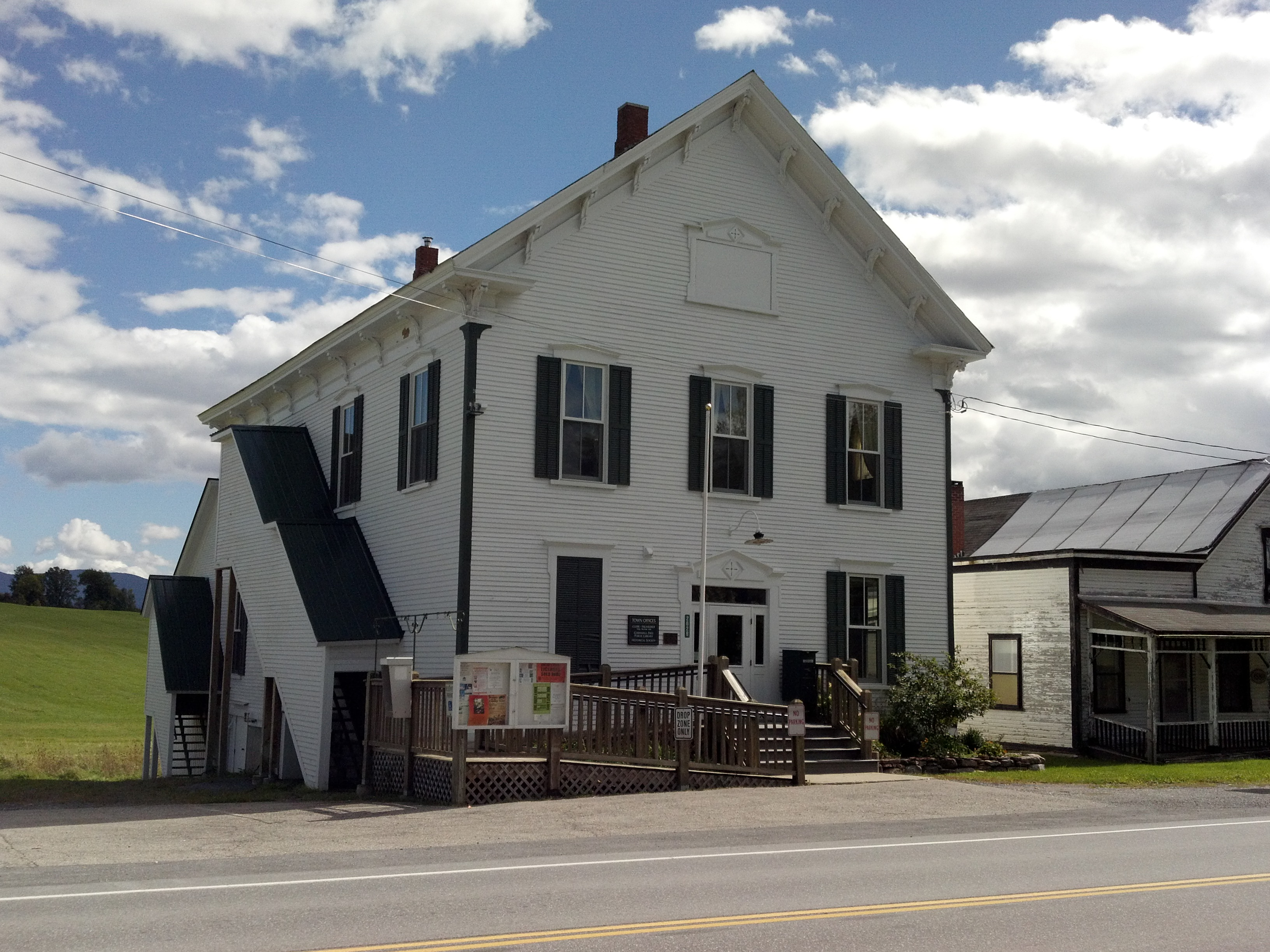

- Location within Vermont Location within the United States
- Location: 2629 VT 30, Cornwall, Vermont
- Coordinates: 43°57′41″N 73°12′34″W
- Area: 0.1 acres (0.040 ha)
- Built: 1880
- Architectural style: Italianate
- NRHP reference No.: 86001035
- Added to NRHP: May 8, 1986

The Cornwall Town Hall is located at 2629 Vermont Route 30 in Cornwall, Vermont. Built in 1880 and enlarged in 1905 to also house the local Grange chapter, it is one of the rural community's few examples of Italianate architecture, and has served as a community meeting point since its construction. It was listed on the National Register of Historic Places in 1986.

== Description and history ==
Cornwall's town hall stands in its small village center, on the east side of Vermont Route 30, just north of its junction with Vermont Route 74. It is a 2 1/2-story wood-frame structure, with a gabled roof, clapboarded exterior, and a foundation of stone and concrete. The eaves are studded with Italianate brackets, and the upper floor windows of the front section have peaked lintels. The front entrance is framed by sidelights and pilasters, and is also topped by a peaked gable. The interior is divided into town offices on the ground floor, with an auditorium space on the second floor. A single-story shed-roof addition extends to the rear.

The town hall was built in 1880, a period of prosperity in the town occasioned by its success as a merino sheep farming community. The rear addition, housing kitchen facilities, was added during alterations in 1905 to accommodate the town's Grange chapter, which was founded in 1903. The Grange funded a number of other improvements, including an updated heating plant, and the eventual electrification of the building. Its exterior architectural elements resemble designs of Middlebury architect Clinton G. Smith, although the designer of this building is not known with certainty.

== See also ==
- National Register of Historic Places listings in Addison County, Vermont
