= List of census-designated places in Vermont =

This article lists census-designated places (CDPs) in the U.S. state of Vermont. At the 2020 census, there were a total of 139 CDPs in Vermont.

== Census-designated places ==
CDP	Population	County
Algiers	186	Windham
Arlington	1,249	Bennington
Ascutney	529	Windsor
Bakersfield	347	Franklin
Barnet	127	Caledonia
Beecher Falls	139	Essex
Bennington	8,795	Bennington
Benson	269	Rutland
Bethel	670	Windsor
Bolton	23	Chittenden
Bolton Valley	295	Chittenden
Bradford	907	Orange
Brandon	1,727	Rutland
Brattleboro	7,352	Windham
Bristol	1,936	Addison
Cabot	235	Washington
Canaan	393	Essex
Castleton	1,337	Rutland
Castleton Four Corners	699	Rutland
Cavendish	246	Windsor
Chelsea	342	Orange
Chester	1,132	Windsor
Chimney Hill	263	Windham
Chittenden	136	Rutltand
Concord	213	Essex
Coventry	111	Orleans
Danby	200	Rutland
Danville	385	Caledonia
Dorset	360	Bennington
East Barre	811	Washington
East Burke	94	Caledonia
East Charlotte	169	Chittenden
East Dorset	296	Bennington
East Middlebury	426	Addison
East Montpelier	107	Washington
East Poultney	288	Rutland
Fair Haven	2,225	Rutland
Fairfax	865	Franklin
Fairlee	198	Orange
Gilman	238	Essex
Glover	256	Orleans
Grafton	49	Windham
Graniteville	717	Washington
Greensboro	156	Orleans
Greensboro Bend	237	Orleans
Groton	419	Caledonia
Hanksville	62	Chittenden
Hardwick	1,269	Caledonia
Harmonyville	92	Windham
Hartford Village	754	Windsor
Hartland	379	Windsor
Highgate Center	361	Franklin
Highgate Springs	77	Franklin
Hinesburg	872	Chittenden
Huntington	535	Chittenden
Huntington Center	156	Chittenden
Irasburg	159	Orleans
Island Pond	750	Essex
Jamaica	174	Windham
Killington Village	861	Rutland
Lincoln	266	Addison
Londonderry	180	Windham
Lowell	254	Orleans
Lunenberg	234	Essex
Lyndon	203	Caledonia
Lyndon Center	187	Caledonia
Manchester Center	2,145	Bennington
Middlebury	7,304	Addison
Middletown Springs	194	Rutland
Milton	3,804	Chittenden
New Haven	245	Addison
Newport Center	231	Orleans
North Clarendon	396	Rutland
North Hartland	321	Windsor
North Hyde Park	403	Lamoille
North Pownal	303	Bennington
North Springfield	694	Windsor
North Westminster	262	Windham
Northfield	3,757	Washington
Norwich	905	Windsor
Pawlett	194	Rutland
Peacham	147	Caledonia
Pittsford	805	Rutland
Plainfield	424	Washington
Pownal	548	Bennington
Pownal Center	437	Bennington
Proctor	1,565	Rutland
Proctorsville	451	Windsor
Putney	571	Windham
Quechee	831	Windsor
Randolph	2,083	Orange
Readsboro	297	Bennington
Richford	1,304	Franklin
Richmond	853	Chittenden
Rochester	321	Windsor
Sheffield	186	Caledonia
Shelburne	6,178	Chittenden
South Barre	1,193	Washington
South Hero	225	Grand Isle
South Lincoln	251	Addison
South Londonderry	147	Windham
South Royalton	654	Windsor
South Shaftsbury	681	Bennington
South Woodstock	109	Windsor
Springfield	4,189	Windsor
St. George	498	Chittenden
St. Johnsbury	5,994	Caledonia
Stamford	467	Bennington
Stowe	616	Lamoille
Stratton Mountain	335	Bennington; Windham
Sutton	153	Caledonia
Townsend	199	Windham
Troy	261	Orleans
Underhill Center	142	Chittenden
Underhill Flats	643	Chittenden
Waitsfield	330	Washington
Wallingford	818	Rutland
Wardsboro	70	Windham
Waterbury	1,897	Washington
Waterbury Center	390	Washington
Websterville	570	Washington
Wells	386	Rutland
West Brattleboro	2,803	Windham
West Charlotte	169	Chittenden
West Dummerston	77	Windham
West Pawlet	220	Rutland
West Rutland	1,898	Rutland
West Woodstock	401	Windsor
Westford	99	Chittenden
Weston	77	Windsor
White River Junction	2,528	Windsor
Whitingham	91	Windham
Wilder	3,071	Windsor
Williamstown	1,264	Orange
Wilmington	439	Windham
Windsor	2,139	Windsor
Wolcott	176	Lamoille
Worcester	120	Washington

== See also ==
- List of municipalities in Vermont
