= Vermont Route 73 =

East-west state highway in Vermont, US

Vermont Route 73
- VT 73 highlighted in red

Route information
- Maintained by VTrans and the Towns of Shoreham and Orwell
- Length: 36.674 mi (59.021 km)

Major junctions
- West end: VT 74 in Shoreham
- US 7 in Brandon
- East end: VT 100 in Rochester

Location
- Country: United States
- State: Vermont
- Counties: Addison, Rutland, Windsor

Highway system
- State highways in Vermont
← VT 68	→ VT 73A
← VT 114	→ VT 116
← VT F-9A	→ US 2

Vermont Route 73 (VT 73) is a 36.674-mile-long (59.021 km) east–west state highway in central Vermont, United States. It extends from VT 74 in Shoreham in the west to VT 100 in Rochester in the east. The route runs through parts of Addison, Rutland, and Windsor counties. The portion of VT 73 west of VT 22A is town-maintained and internally designated by VTrans as Major Collector 156 while the remainder of VT 73 is maintained by the state.

== Route description ==
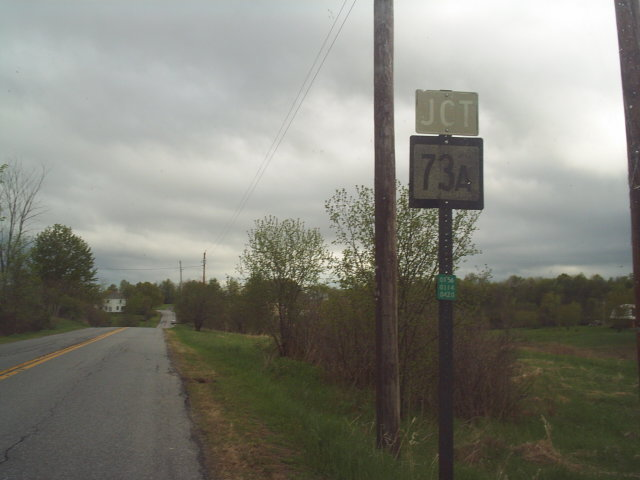
Old signage for VT 73A along VT 73

Route 73 begins at an intersection with Route 74, approximately 0.6 miles (0.97 km) east of the Ticonderoga–Larrabees Point Ferry to New York. The route runs southeast into the town of Orwell, where it crosses Route 22A. Route 73 continues due east out of Orwell and into the town of Sudbury, where it meets Route 30. Route 73 turns north to join Route 30, and the two routes share a short concurrency before Route 73 splits back off to the east. It continues into the town of Brandon, intersecting with U.S. Route 7 in the town center. Route 73 briefly overlaps US 7 before splitting off to the northeast. The highway continues into the village of Forestdale (still in Brandon) where it meets the southern terminus of Route 53. Route 73 continues to the east in the town of Goshen before coming to an end at Route 100 in Rochester. The section from Brandon to Rochester was VT 115 and the section from Brandon to Orwell was VT F-10.

== Major intersections ==
County	Location	mi	km	Destinations	Notes
Addison	Shoreham	0.000	0.000	VT 74 – Ferry to N.Y. State, Shoreham, Middlebury	Western terminus
Addison	Orwell	5.500	8.851	Mount Independence Road	Former eastern terminus of VT 73A
Addison	Orwell	5.850	9.415	VT 22A – Shoreham, Fair Haven	
Rutland	Sudbury	11.157	17.955	VT 30 south – Hubbardton, Castleton Corners	Western end of concurrency with VT 30
Rutland	Sudbury	13.339	21.467	VT 30 north – Whiting, Middlebury	Eastern end of concurrency with VT 30
Rutland	Brandon	19.260	30.996	US 7 north	Western end of concurrency with US 7
Rutland	Brandon	19.676	31.665	US 7 south	Eastern end of concurrency with US 7
Rutland	Brandon	22.531	36.260	VT 53 north – Lake Dunmore	Southern terminus of VT 53
Windsor	Rochester	36.674	59.021	VT 100 – Rochester, Hancock, Granville, Stockbridge, Bethel	Eastern terminus
1.000 mi = 1.609 km; 1.000 km = 0.621 mi: Concurrency terminus
