= Satan's Kingdom =

Satan's Kingdom can refer to:

- Satan's Kingdom, Massachusetts
- Satans Kingdom, Vermont
- Satan's Kingdom State Recreation Area, Connecticut
