= Henry Olin =

American politician (1768–1837)

Member of the U.S. House of Representatives from Vermont's at-large district
- In office December 13, 1824 – March 3, 1825
- Preceded by: Charles Rich
- Succeeded by: George Edward Wales

8th Lieutenant Governor of Vermont
- In office 1827–1830
- Governor: Ezra Butler; Samuel C. Crafts
- Preceded by: Aaron Leland
- Succeeded by: Mark Richards

Member of the Vermont House of Representatives
- In office 1799–1804; 1806–1815; 1817–1819; 1822–1824

Personal details
- Born: May 7, 1768 Shaftsbury, New Hampshire Grants (now Vermont)
- Died: August 18, 1837 (aged 69) Salisbury, Vermont, US
- Party: Democratic-Republican
- Spouse(s): Lois Richardson Olin and Polly Sanford Olin
- Profession: Politician, Lawyer

Henry Olin (May 7, 1768 – August 18, 1837) was an American lawyer and politician. He served as a United States representative from Vermont and eighth lieutenant governor of Vermont.

== Biography ==
Olin was born in Shaftsbury in the New Hampshire Grants (now Vermont) on May 7, 1768 to Justin Olin and Sally Dwinell Olin. He attended the common schools. He studied law and was admitted to the bar. He moved to Leicester in the Vermont Republic in 1788 and began the practice of law.

Olin served in the Vermont House of Representatives from 1799 to 1804, 1806 to 1815, 1817 to 1819 and 1822 to 1824. He was a delegate to the State constitutional conventions in 1814, 1822, and 1828. He was associate judge and then chief judge of the Addison County Court from 1801 to 1824. He served as a member of the executive council in 1820 and 1821.

Olin was elected to the Eighteenth Congress as a Democratic-Republican candidate to fill the vacancy caused by the death of Charles Rich. He served in Congress from December 13, 1824 to March 3, 1825. He was elected as the Lieutenant Governor of Vermont, and served from 1827 to 1830.

== Family life ==
Henry Olin married Lois Richardson in 1788 and they had ten children. Following her death, he married Polly Sanford Olin and they had one child. Olin was the nephew of Gideon Olin, who also served as a United States Representative from Vermont. Gideon Olin's son, Judge Abram B. Olin, was Henry Olin's cousin.

== Death ==
Olin died on August 18, 1837 in Salisbury, Vermont. He is interred at Brookside Cemetery in Leicester, Vermont.

Party political offices
Preceded by Samuel C. Crafts	National Republican nominee for Lieutenant Governor of Vermont; 1828, 1829	Succeeded by Mark Richards
U.S. House of Representatives
Preceded by Charles Rich	Member of the U.S. House of Representatives from Vermont's 3rd congressional district 1824-1825	Succeeded by George E. Wales
Political offices
Preceded by Aaron Leland	Lieutenant Governor of Vermont; 1827–1830	Succeeded by Mark Richards
