= Satans Kingdom, Vermont =

- Unincorporated community
- Location within Vermont
- Coordinates: 43°52′35″N 73°03′51″W
- Country: United States
- State: Vermont
- County: Addison
- Town: Leicester
- Elevation: 637 ft (194 m)
- Time zone: UTC-5 (Eastern (EST))
  - Summer (DST): UTC-4 (EDT)
- Area code: 802
- GNIS feature ID: 1461375

Satans Kingdom is an unincorporated community in the town of Leicester in Addison County, Vermont, United States. It is located along Vermont Route 53 near the southern shore of Lake Dunmore and just north of Fern Lake.

Satans Kingdom was so named for their rocky soil, which is unsuitable for farming. Satans Kingdom has been noted for its unusual place name.

== See also ==
- Satan's Kingdom, Massachusetts
