= Stone Mill =

Stone Mill may refer to:

- Stone Mill, New Jersey, a community also known as Readingsburg
- Stone Mill (Middlebury, Vermont), a building listed on the NRHP
- Old Stone Mill (Newport, Rhode Island), a community also known as Newport Tower
- Dunham's Mill, also known as the Stone Mill in Clinton, New Jersey
- Lillian and Amy Goldman Stone Mill, building in New York City
- Stone Mills, a township in Ontario, Canada
