= Branbury State Park =

State park in Addison County, Vermont

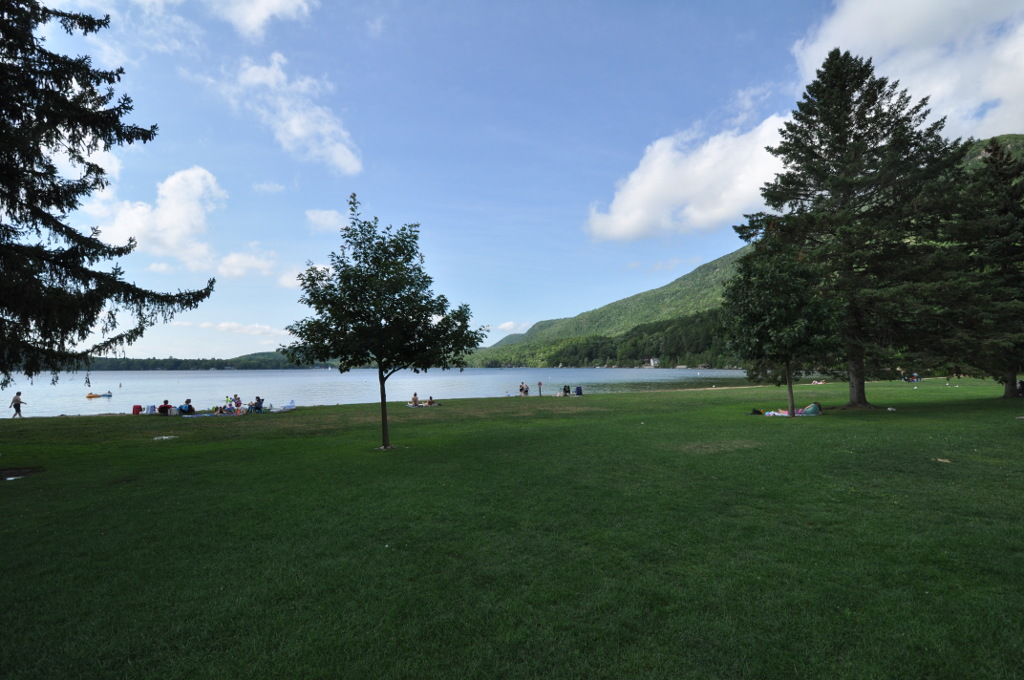
- View of Lake Dunmore from the park

- Location within Vermont
- Interactive map of Branbury State Park
- Location: Salisbury and Leicester, Vermont, United States
- Coordinates: 43°54′22″N 73°04′00″W
- Area: 69 acres (28 ha)
- Established: 1945
- Administrator: Vermont Department of Forests, Parks, and Recreation
- Open: Second weekend in May through second Monday in October
- Website: Official website
- Vermont State Parks

Branbury State Park is a 69-acre state park in the towns of Salisbury and Leicester, Vermont. The park is located on the eastern shore of Lake Dunmore at the base of Mt. Moosalamoo. It is divided by Vermont Route 53.

Activities includes boating, swimming, camping, fishing, hiking, picnicking, wildlife watching and winter sports.

Facilities include a sandy beach, boat rentals, a snack concession, 37 tent sites and 7 lean-to sites, flush toilets, hot showers, and a dump station. There is a nature center and park rangers offer interpretive programs including night hikes, campfire programs, amphibian explorations, and nature crafts and games.

Green Mountain National Forest is adjacent to the park's east side.
