= Ann Story =

American Revolutionary War Folk Hero

Ann Story (February 27, 1735/1736. – April 5, 1817) was a regionally renowned heroine during the American Revolutionary War in the area that would later become the state of Vermont. Her fame was largely a result of Daniel Pierce Thompson’s historical novel The Green Mountain Boys published in 1839, twenty-two years after her death

== Early life ==
Ann was born Hannah Reynolds to Jonathan and Hannah (Tracy) Reynolds of Preston, Connecticut. She went by the nickname "Ann" to distinguish her from her mother. Jonathan was a farm laborer, and Ann was one of the couple's six surviving children. Orphaned at the age of eight, Ann grew up in the home of an uncle. At the age of 19, she married Amos Story of Ipswich, Massachusetts, on September 17, 1755, in Preston. Amos was a hired farm worker, as Ann's father had been, and the prospect of owning his own farm eventually led Amos to look northward to the frontier where cheaper land could be found.

== Life on the northeastern frontier ==
Much of what is known of Ann Reynolds Story's life on the northeastern frontier comes from the 1860 History of Salisbury, Vermont written by John M. Weeks (1788–1858), who was Ann's neighbor during her last 28 years in Salisbury. Other snippets of information appear to have been passed down through family members and friends.

Salisbury, in what was to become Addison County, Vermont, was one of the towns granted for settlement in 1761 by Benning Wentworth, governor of the Province of New Hampshire. The original grantees of the town were from Connecticut, many from the vicinity of Litchfield. (The agent for the grantees, John Evarts, was from Salisbury, Connecticut, the probable source of the new town's name.) Salisbury and similarly chartered towns were in disputed territory, the "New Hampshire Grants", claimed by both the Provinces of New Hampshire and New York, as well as Quebec. This dispute put the ownership of settlers’ lands in question, thereby tending to inhibit settlement. The boundary dispute was not fully resolved prior to the Revolutionary War, and during the war the region declared itself to be the independent Vermont Republic in 1777, becoming the 14th state in 1791.

In March 1775, fourteen years after Salisbury was originally chartered, Amos Story, then living in Norwich, Connecticut (adjacent to Preston), acquired 100 acres in the town through a gratuity that was offered to try to attract settlers. He was the second settler in the town. That fall, Amos and his son Solomon, then about 15, put up a small log house and began clearing the land for crops. Within a few weeks, Amos was killed when a tree that he was taking down fell upon him. His son walked several miles into nearby Middlebury to get help. He came upon Benjamin Smalley, the first settler in southwestern Middlebury, who, along with his sons, returned with Solomon and buried his father.

Shortly thereafter, Solomon returned to take the news of Amos's death to his mother and siblings who were temporarily residing in Rutland. As John Weeks relates, “It would seem that the painful circumstances of Mr. Story’s death would deter his surviving family from any further effort, at least for several years, to settle a new country, but this event appeared rather to excite in Mrs. Story a still stronger desire to enter upon the hardships of a pioneer of the wilderness, and to clear up and cultivate the land which her husband had selected for their future home… By her persevering and indomitable spirit she appeared determined to overcome every obstacle which might prevent her from clearing and cultivating her farm.” And, indeed, in the spring of 1776, Ann took her three sons (Solomon, Samuel, and Ephriam) and two daughters (Hannah and Susanna) and moved the family to the log home in Salisbury that her husband and son had already erected.

According to Weeks, “Widow Story” was a woman up to the task. She was, “of very large stature and masculine appearance, and possessed all the physical strength and hardihood which her looks would indicate.” He notes that she was not afraid of the Tories (Loyalists), Indian Americans, or the wild animals in the area, that she could fire a musket if needed, and that she could wield an axe and handle a lever for rolling logs as well as any of the men in the area.

In early 1777, as word reached the northern frontier of the hostilities between the colonists and the British, many inhabitants in the sparsely populated areas of what would soon become Vermont began moving south to the security of areas with greater numbers of residents. Despite the dangers, Ann Story opted to remain on the farm with her children, even after all of her Salisbury neighbors had abandoned the area. She raised crops through most of the years of the Revolutionary War, though she went as far south as Rutland (a little over 20 miles) to spend the winters.

During the war, Ann earned a reputation as a friend to the Patriots and a foe of the Loyalists. She acted on occasion as both a spy and courier for the Vermont Militia, or “Green Mountain Boys”, which two of Ann's sons were later to join. Otter Creek, near where Ann's cabin was located, was a thoroughfare in those days. The Story cabin was used to house Patriots passing through the area, including Col. Ethan Allen, according to oral tradition. Tradition also says that Ann even volunteered to fight, if needed, reportedly saying, “Give me a place among you, and see if I am the first to desert my post.”

Weeks relates a few of Ann Story's accounts of the hardships endured on the frontier during the war. In the early spring of 1776, Indians, most of whom sided with the British, began pillaging and burning homes in the vicinity, homes that had been abandoned when their owners fled to the south. One of her children spotted smoke at their nearest neighbor's home, about a quarter of a mile from their cabin, and the family quickly gathered their valuables and put them into a canoe at the bank of the river, a few steps from their doorway. “Unobserved by the Indians, we shoved off our boat, and were soon fairly out of their reach in the deep water of the swamp… We stationed ourselves back in the swamp, at a considerable distance from the house, where we could observe their movements and make sure the hour and direction of their departure. Here we saw Mr. Grave’s house and our own burn down at the hand of our cruel foes.” Ann says that the family immediately resolved to rebuild their home and before long had erected another dwelling made of smaller trees, since they had no team of horses or oxen to haul logs. According to family tradition, the rebuilt cabin had a trap door that led into a crevice in the ledge beneath, which could then be followed toward the river. The cabin was eventually replaced with a plank home.

To keep the family more secure from possible future attacks, Ann and her children dug a horizontal cavern on the west bank of Otter Creek. The mouth of the makeshift cave was large enough to admit their canoe with all the family lying prostrate inside. Once inside, the canoe could be hidden and bushes used to conceal the mouth of the cave. The family stored food and slept at a somewhat higher level inside the cave, above the waterline, coming out to cook, eat in their home, and work on the farm during the day.

Mrs. Story related that at one point her family gave asylum to a woman who had been taken captive by the Indians but was later released when she was unable to keep up with her captors due to her advanced pregnancy. After the birth of the woman's child, its crying was a cause of great concern for the Storys when they were hidden in their riverbank cave during the nights. Early one morning a Tory by the name of Ezekiel Jenny was passing through the area and heard the cries of the child. Stopping to listen, he saw Ann push their canoe out from their place of hiding. Jenny then questioned Ann about the movements of Patriots in the area, and when her answers seemed evasive, Jenny “threatened to shoot me upon the spot; but to all his threats I bid defiance and told him I had no fears of being shot by so consummate a coward as he; and finally he passed along down the creek, and I lost no time in notifying Foot and Bentley [Patriots] that Tories were within our borders; and immediately all the Whigs [the term was used at that time to denote Patriots] who could be raised were set upon their track, and overtook them the same day in Monkton, and that night captured every one of them, to the number of about twenty, and delivered them up to our authorities at Ticonderoga.”

== Later years ==
In 1783, following the official peace between the Americans and Britain, Ann's family returned to permanent year-round occupancy of their Salisbury farm. In 1792, after her sons had reached adulthood and her daughters were married, Ann married widower Benjamin Smalley, the man who had buried her husband eighteen years earlier. Mr. Smalley became infirm in 1805 and died in debt in 1807, leaving Ann poor and under the financial care of the town. Ann then took up service as a midwife and nurse to the elderly. She was married again in 1812 to Captain Stephen Goodrich, a Revolutionary veteran and one of the early settlers of Middlebury. Goodrich had served at both the Battle of Bunker Hill and the Battles of Saratoga. With Stephen Goodrich, Ann was able to live in more comfortable circumstances for the remaining five years of her life. She died April 5, 1817, and is buried beside her third husband under the name of Hannah Goodrich in the Seeley (Farmingdale) Cemetery on Three Mile Bridge Road in Middlebury, Vermont.

== Memorials ==
To avoid confusion as to her identity, in 1898 the Ann Story Chapter of the Daughters of the American Revolution (D.A.R.) of Rutland arranged to have added to her headstone: “Formerly Ann Story, The Heroine of Thompson’s Green Mountain Boys.” In 1905 the Vermont Society of Colonial Dames placed a monument of Vermont marble in honor of Ann Story at the site of her home during the Revolutionary War. The Mary Baker Chapter of the D.A.R. placed another marble monument on the opposite side of Otter Creek in Cornwall, Vermont, in 1914 at the site of the Story cave. And in 1974, the bicentennial of the building of Amos and Ann Story's original cabin, and under the auspices of the Salisbury-Leicester Historical Society, a reconstructed Revolutionary era log cabin from Addison, Vermont, was erected on the Salisbury site as an additional memorial of the original Story home. The cabin was officially dedicated in 1976 but was destroyed by arson in 2004. On October 19, 2018, the Ann Story Chapter of the Daughters of the American Revolution unveiled a marble statue of Ann Story in Rutland, Vermont, and on May 30, 2026 the State of Vermont unveiled an historic site marker in Ann's honor near the site of the Story cabin in Salisbury.

== Sources ==
- Clifford, Deborah. (2009). More Than Petticoats: Remarkable Vermont Women. Guilford, Connecticut: The Globe Pequot Press. ISBN 978-0-7627-4306-3
- Hahn, Michael T. (1996). Ann Story: Vermont’s Heroine of Independence. Shelburne, Vermont: New England Press. ISBN 1-881535-16-9.
- Petersen, Max P. (1976). Salisbury: From Birth to Bicentennial. South Burlington, Vermont: The Offset House.
- Those Intriguing Indomitable Vermont Women. (1980). The Vermont State Division of the American Association of University Women.
- Weeks, John M. (1860). History of Salisbury, Vermont. Middlebury, Vermont: A.H. Copeland.
