= New Haven (CDP), Vermont =

Census-designated place in Vermont, United States

New Haven, Vermont
- Census-designated place
- Location within Vermont Location within the United States
- Coordinates: 44°07′20″N 73°09′08″W
- Country: United States
- State: Vermont
- County: Addison
- Town: New Haven

Area
  - Total: 2.68 sq mi (6.93 km^{2})
  - Land: 2.67 sq mi (6.92 km^{2})
  - Water: 0.0039 sq mi (0.01 km^{2})
- Elevation: 443 ft (135 m)
- Time zone: UTC-5 (Eastern (EST))
  - Summer (DST): UTC-4 (EDT)
- ZIP Code: 05472
- Area code: 802
- FIPS code: 50-48550
- GNIS feature ID: 2805704

New Haven is the central settlement and a census-designated place (CDP) in the town of New Haven, Addison County, Vermont, United States. It was first listed as a CDP prior to the 2020 census.

== Geography ==
The community is in north-central Addison County, in the north-central part of the town of New Haven. Vermont Route 17 passes through the community, leading east 4 miles (6 km) to Bristol and west 1.4 miles (2.3 km) to U.S. Route 7 at New Haven Junction. Middlebury, the Addison county seat, is 8 miles (13 km) south of New Haven.
