= Leicester, Vermont =

- Town
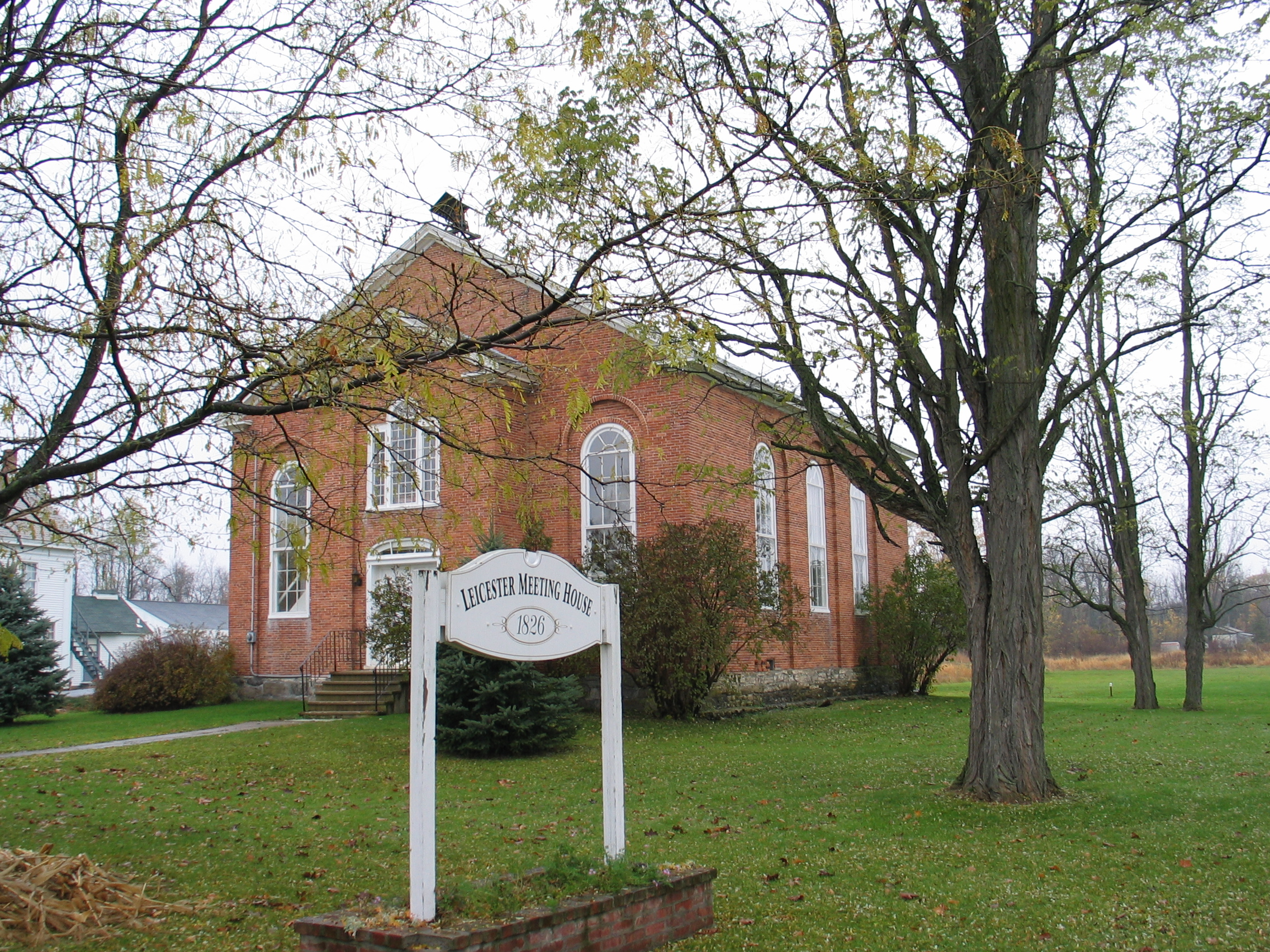
- Leicester Meeting House
- Motto: A Great Place to Live
- Location in Addison County and the state of Vermont
- Coordinates: 43°52′41″N 73°06′56″W
- Country: United States
- State: Vermont
- County: Addison
- Chartered: 1761
- Settled: 1773
- Organized: 1786
- Communities: Leicester; Fernville; Leicester Junction; Satans Kingdom

Area
  - Total: 21.8 sq mi (56.4 km^{2})
  - Land: 20.8 sq mi (54.0 km^{2})
  - Water: 0.93 sq mi (2.4 km^{2})
- Elevation: 502 ft (153 m)

Population (2020)
  - Total: 990
  - Density: 47/sq mi (18.3/km^{2})
- Time zone: UTC-5 (Eastern (EST))
  - Summer (DST): UTC-4 (EDT)
- ZIP codes: 05733 (Leicester); 05769 (Salisbury); 05778 (Whiting)
- Area code: 802
- FIPS code: 50-39325
- GNIS feature ID: 1462132
- Website: www.leicestervt.org

Leicester (/ˈlɛstər/ LEST-ər) is a town in Addison County, Vermont, United States. The population was 990 at the 2020 census.

== Geography ==
Leicester is located along the southern border of Addison County at the western edge of the Green Mountains. It is bordered by the town of Whiting to the west, Salisbury to the north, and Goshen to the east. The town of Brandon in Rutland County is to the south. U.S. Route 7 passes north-south through the center of Leicester, connecting Brandon and Rutland to the south with Middlebury to the north. Vermont Route 53, Lake Dunmore Road, travels north-south through the eastern part of Leicester, passing through the settlements of Satans Kingdom and Fernville. The southern half of Lake Dunmore, a recreational area, is in Leicester.

According to the United States Census Bureau, the town has a total area of 21.8 square miles (56.4 km^{2}), of which 20.8 square miles (54.0 km^{2}) is land and 0.93 square miles (2.4 km^{2}), or 4.28%, is water.

== Demographics ==
Historical population
Census	Pop.	Note	%±
1790	343		—
1800	522		52.2%
1810	609		16.7%
1820	548		−10.0%
1830	638		16.4%
1840	602		−5.6%
1850	596		−1.0%
1860	737		23.7%
1870	630		−14.5%
1880	634		0.6%
1890	562		−11.4%
1900	509		−9.4%
1910	479		−5.9%
1920	436		−9.0%
1930	468		7.3%
1940	518		10.7%
1950	511		−1.4%
1960	551		7.8%
1970	583		5.8%
1980	803		37.7%
1990	871		8.5%
2000	974		11.8%
2010	1,100		12.9%
2020	990		−10.0%
U.S. Decennial Census

As of the census of 2000, there were 974 people, 391 households, and 267 families residing in the town. The population density was 45.8 people per square mile (17.7/km^{2}). There were 618 housing units at an average density of 29.0 per square mile (11.2/km^{2}). The racial makeup of the town was 98.97% White, 0.21% African American, 0.10% Native American, 0.21% Pacific Islander, and 0.51% from two or more races. Hispanic or Latino of any race were 0.51% of the population.

There were 391 households, out of which 30.4% had children under the age of 18 living with them, 57.3% were married couples living together, 7.2% had a female householder with no husband present, and 31.7% were non-families. 23.5% of all households were made up of individuals, and 8.2% had someone living alone who was 65 years of age or older. The average household size was 2.49 and the average family size was 2.97.

In the town, the age distribution of the population shows 24.8% under the age of 18, 5.6% from 18 to 24, 30.7% from 25 to 44, 28.3% from 45 to 64, and 10.5% who were 65 years of age or older. The median age was 39 years. For every 100 females, there were 105.1 males. For every 100 females age 18 and over, there were 102.2 males.

The median income for a household in the town was $35,781, and the median income for a family was $45,375. Males had a median income of $26,786 versus $21,484 for females. The per capita income for the town was $21,938. About 8.9% of families and 12.1% of the population were below the poverty line, including 21.6% of those under age 18 and 7.0% of those age 65 or over.

== Notable people ==
- Elsa Barker, author, born in Leicester
- Hiram Capron, founder of Paris, Ontario, Canada
- John Deere, worked in Leicester
- Warren S. Johnson, founder of Johnson Controls, born in Leicester
- Cooke Maroney, art gallery director, raised in Leicester
- Henry Olin, member of the United States House of Representatives from Vermont, lived in Leicester
- Stephen Olin, president of Wesleyan University and Randolph–Macon College, born in Leicester
- Francis G. Parks, Wisconsin newspaper editor and politician, educated in Leicester
- Aaron F. Perry, member of the United States House of Representatives from Ohio, born in Leicester
