= Lucy H. Washington =

American poet and social reformer (1835–1913)

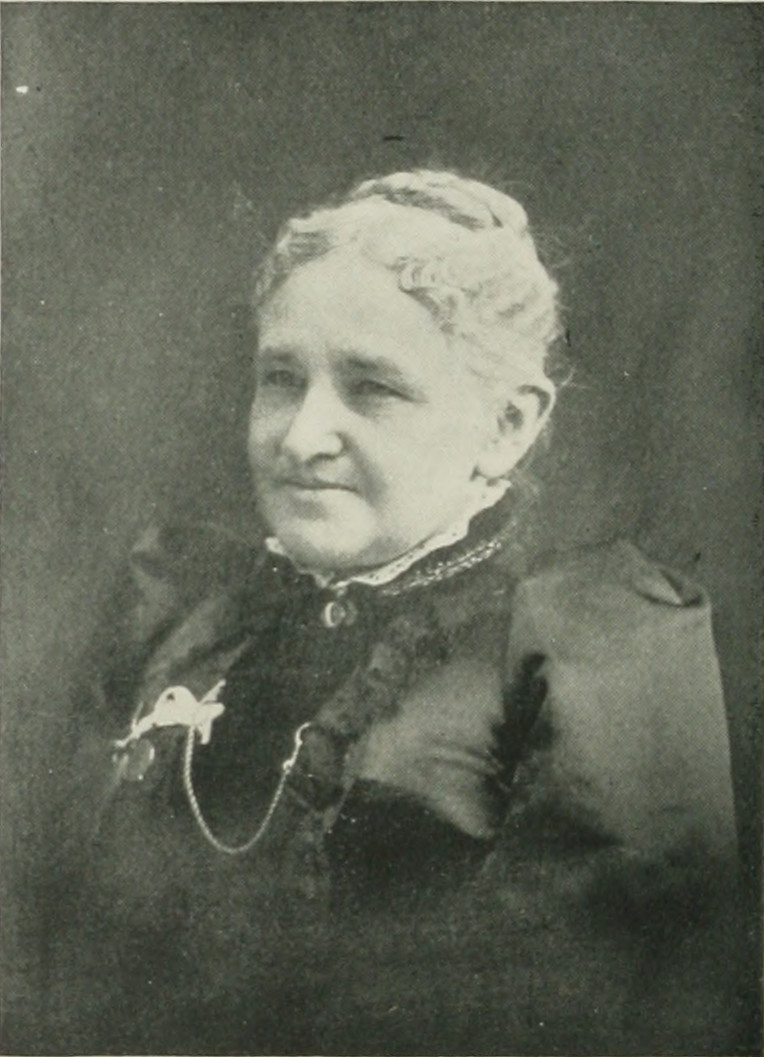
- Photo in A Woman of the Century
- Born: Lucy Hall Walker; January 4, 1835; Whiting, Vermont, U.S.
- Died: September 2, 1913 (aged 78)
- Education: Clover Street Seminary
- Occupations: poet; social reformer
- Spouse: Shadrach Washington (m. 1859)
- Children: Irvin, Edward, Martha, Lucy, Emma, Eleanor
- Writing career
- Language: English
- Notable works: Echoes of Song; Memory's Casket

Lucy H. Washington (née, Walker; January 4, 1835 – September 2, 1913) was an American poet and social reformer of the long nineteenth century, active in the temperance movement. For many years, she was engaged in Woman's Christian Temperance Union (WCTU) work, having given addresses in 24 states, and extended her efforts across the country. In 1878, she published a volume of poems, Echoes of Song, and this was followed by Memory's Casket.

== Early life and education ==
Lucy Hall Walker was born in Whiting, Vermont, January 4, 1835. She was descended from New England ancestry dating back to 1642. Her paternal lineage was traced to Deacon Philip Walker, of Rehoboth, Massachusetts, one of the founders of the commonwealth and also one of the principal characters in King Philip's War. On her maternal side, her ancestry was from Samuel Gile, one of the eleven first settlers of Haverhill, Massachusetts, in 1640. Her early educational advantages were such as the common school, select school and academy of her native State afforded. She also studied at Clover Street Seminary, Rochester, New York, where she was graduated with honors in 1856.

== Career ==
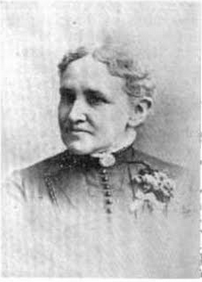
Lucy Hall Washington

Washington's first printed verses appeared at the age of fourteen. From her Clover Street Seminary days, her verses frequently appeared in print, with occasional prose sketches. After graduation, she devoted three years to teaching and was at the time of her marriage preceptress of the Collegiate Institute in Brockport, New York.

In Jacksonville, Illinois, in 1874, Washington became a leader in the temperance crusade movement, and in response to the needs of the time, became an effective public speaker. Her first address in temperance work, outside of her own city, was given in the Hall of Representatives in Springfield, Illinois. She became better-known to the public through commendatory press reports, which led to repeated and urgent calls for lectures. During the succeeding years, she was largely engaged in WCTU work, having given addresses in twenty-four States and extended her efforts from the Atlantic to the Pacific states. She was involved in the campaigns for constitutional prohibition in Iowa, Kansas, Maine, and other States.

In 1887, she published Echoes of Song, a volume containing numerous selections from her poetical writings from early girlhood. Her subsequent contributions, with selections from her first volume, were published under the title of Memory's Casket (Buffalo, 1891). She also contributed to the Magazine of Poetry, and many other periodicals, and some of her hymns were sung throughout the country.

== Personal life ==
She married Rev. Shadrach Washington on July 14, 1859. He was a graduate of University of Rochester and of Rochester Theological Seminary, served prominent churches in both eastern and western United States, and was at one time pastor of the Baptist Church in Port Jervis, New York. She was the mother of Irvin (b. 1860), Edward Everett (1862-1862), Martha Almira (b. 1865), Lucy May (b. 1867), Emma Marion (1870-1871), and Eleanor (b. 1872). Washington died September 2, 1913.

== Selected works ==
=== Books ===
- Echoes of Song, 1887
- Memory's Casket, 1891

=== Hymns ===
- "Look not upon the wine that sparkles"
- "Mama, said little Nellie"
- "Never forget that the Savior"
- "Seek Jesus, seek Jesus, in childhood and youth"
- "There is work to do for Jesus"
- "There's an enemy at hand, shall we forward march or stand"
