= Jarvis White =

American soldier and politician

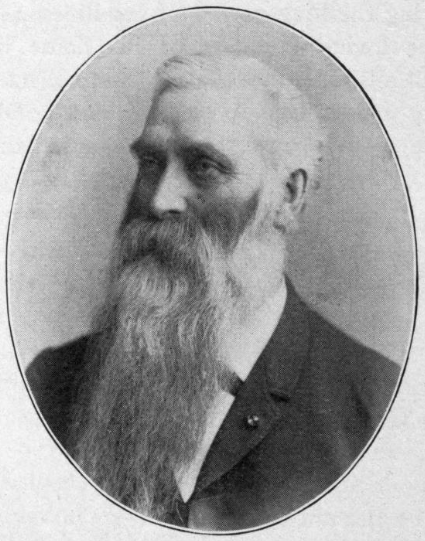

Member of the Wisconsin State Assembly
- In office 1897

Personal details
- Born: April 21, 1833 Whiting, Vermont
- Died: August 8, 1904 (aged 71) South Superior, Wisconsin
- Party: Republican
- Spouse: Loreta Hickman (m. 1891)
- Occupation: Military officer, businessman, politician

Jarvis White (1833–1904) was a member of the Wisconsin State Assembly.

== Biography ==
White was born on April 21, 1833 in Whiting, Vermont. During the American Civil War, White enlisted in the Union Army and eventually reached the rank of captain. During the Second Battle of Deep Bottom, he received a serious wound in his thigh. Afterwards, White became a businessman in Milford, Massachusetts before moving to Davenport, Iowa in 1874.

He settled South Superior, Wisconsin in 1890, where he was a dealer of wallpaper, oils and paints. The following year, he married Loreta Hickman. White died at his home in South Superior on August 8, 1904.

== Political career ==
White was elected to the Assembly in 1896. Additionally, he was an alderman and Postmaster of South Superior. He was a Republican.
