= Vermont Route 53 =

State highway in central Vermont, US

Vermont Route 53
- Lake Dunmore Road
- VT 53 highlighted in red

Route information
- Maintained by the towns of Brandon, Leicester, and Salisbury
- Length: 9.310 mi (14.983 km)

Major junctions
- South end: VT 73 in Brandon
- North end: US 7 in Salisbury

Location
- Country: United States
- State: Vermont
- Counties: Rutland, Addison

Highway system
- State highways in Vermont
← VT 44A	→ VT 56

Vermont Route 53 (VT 53) is a 9.310-mile-long (14.983 km) state highway in central Vermont, United States. It is a town-maintained highway that extends from VT 73 in the Forest Dale section of Brandon north to U.S. Route 7 (US 7) in Salisbury. VT 53 is named Lake Dunmore Road and runs around the north and east of Lake Dunmore, passing Branbury State Park.

== Route description ==
VT 53 begins at the junction with VT 73 in Forest Dale. The road continues north as North Street along the western edges of Mount Carmel State Forest, before bending to the northwest and then northeast as Lake Dunmore Road. After passing by Fern Lake to the west, VT 53 continues into the state forest, passing through Dunmore Acres and along the eastern shoreline of Lake Dunmore. At the north end of the lake, VT 53 turns to the west, leaving the forest and the lake shoreline as it ends at US 7.

VT 53 was heavily damaged by storms in 2008, with a bridge destroyed immediately south of Branbury State Park with no detour possible.

== Major intersections ==
County	Location	mi	km	Destinations	Notes
Rutland	Brandon	0.000	0.000	VT 73 (Forest Dale Road)	Southern terminus
Addison	Salisbury	9.310	14.983	US 7 – Middlebury, Burlington, Brandon, Rutland	Northern terminus
1.000 mi = 1.609 km; 1.000 km = 0.621 mi
