= Horace Everett =

American politician (1779–1851)

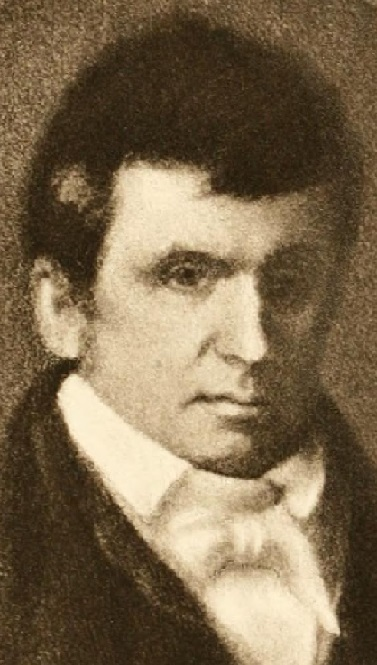
- Horace Everett, Congressman from Vermont

Member of the U.S. House of Representatives from Vermont's 3rd district
- In office March 4, 1829 – March 3, 1843
- Preceded by: George Edward Wales
- Succeeded by: George Perkins Marsh

Member of the Vermont House of Representatives
- In office 1819–1820; 1822; 1824; 1834

Personal details
- Born: July 17, 1779 Foxboro, Massachusetts, U.S.
- Died: January 30, 1851 (aged 71) Windsor, Vermont, U.S.
- Party: Democratic-Republican; National Republican; Anti-Jacksonian; Whig
- Spouse: Mary Leverett
- Children: Horace Everett
- Education: Brown University
- Profession: Politician, Lawyer

Horace Everett (July 17, 1779 – January 30, 1851) was an American politician. He served as a United States representative from Vermont.

== Biography ==
Everett was born in Foxboro, Massachusetts. His father was John Everett; his mother was Melatiah (Metcalf) Ware. In 1797 he graduated from Brown University in Providence, Rhode Island. He studied law and was admitted to the bar in 1801. He began the practice of law in Windsor, Vermont.

He served as State's Attorney for Windsor County, Vermont, from 1813 until 1818. He was a member of the Vermont House of Representatives in 1819, 1820, 1822, 1824, and again in 1834. He was a delegate to the State constitutional convention in 1828.

Everett was elected as an Anti-Jacksonian candidate to the 21st United States Congress, 22nd United States Congress, 23rd United States Congress and the 24th United States Congress. He was elected as a Whig to the 25th United States Congress, 26th United States Congress and 27th United States Congress. He served in Congress from March 4, 1829, until March 3, 1843.

== Family life ==
Everett married Mary Leverett on October 31, 1811, and had one son named Horace Everett.

He was a descendant of Richard Everett, founder of both Springfield, Massachusetts, and Dedham, Massachusetts. He was the first cousin of Edward Everett, U.S. representative, U.S. senator and the 15th governor of Massachusetts.

== Death ==
Everett died on January 30, 1851, in Windsor, Vermont.

U.S. House of Representatives
Preceded by George E. Wales	Member of the U.S. House of Representatives from Vermont's 3rd congressional district 1829-1843	Succeeded by George P. Marsh
