= Stone Mill (Middlebury, Vermont) =

- U.S. National Register of Historic Places
- U.S. Historic district – Contributing property
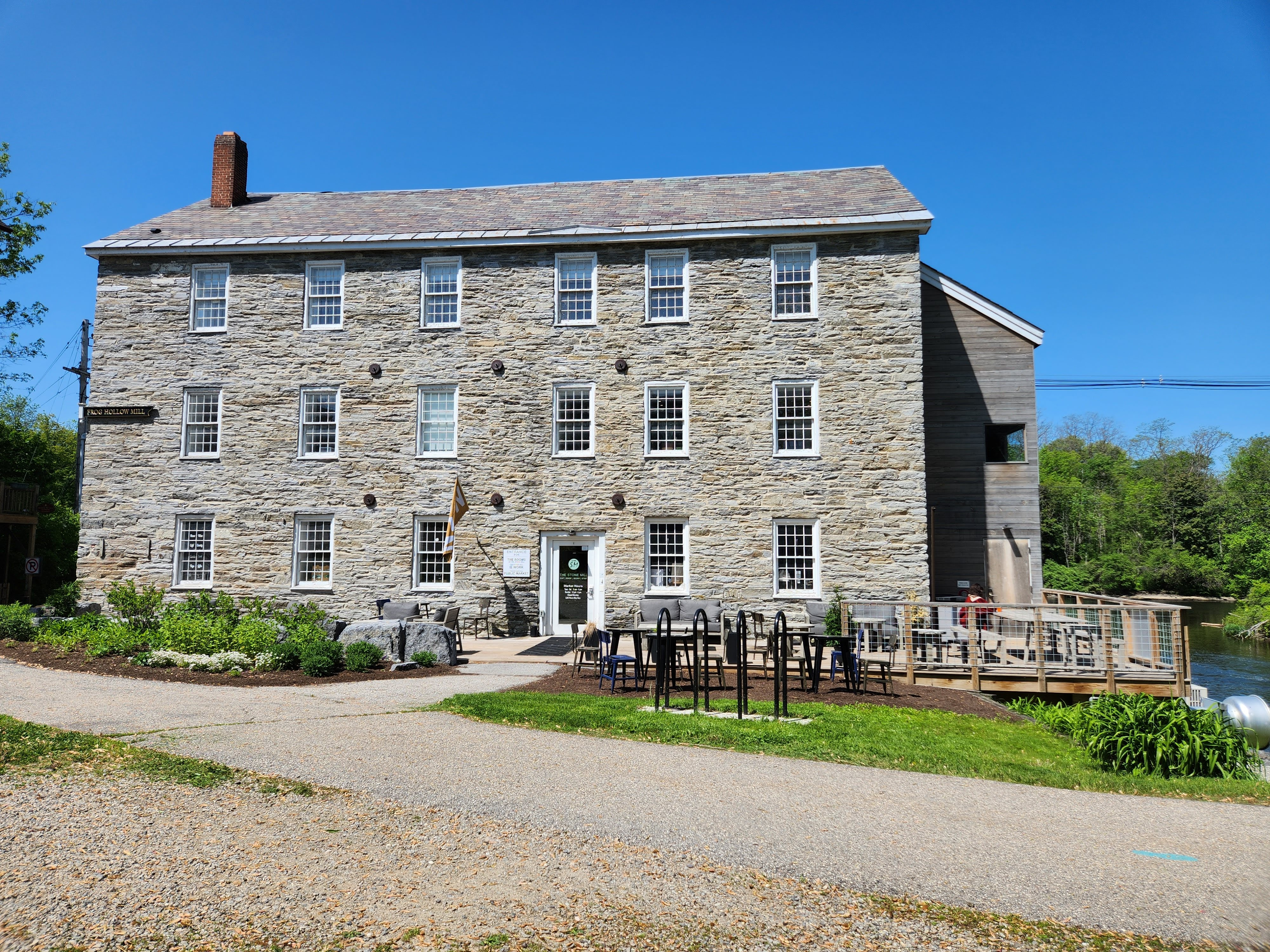

- Location within Vermont
- Location: 3 Mill St. Middlebury, Vermont
- Coordinates: 44°1′5″N 73°10′15″W
- Area: 1 acre (0.40 ha)
- Built: 1840
- Part of: Middlebury Village Historic District (ID76000223\)
- NRHP reference No.: 73000181

Significant dates
- Added to NRHP: April 11, 1973
- Designated CP: November 13, 1976

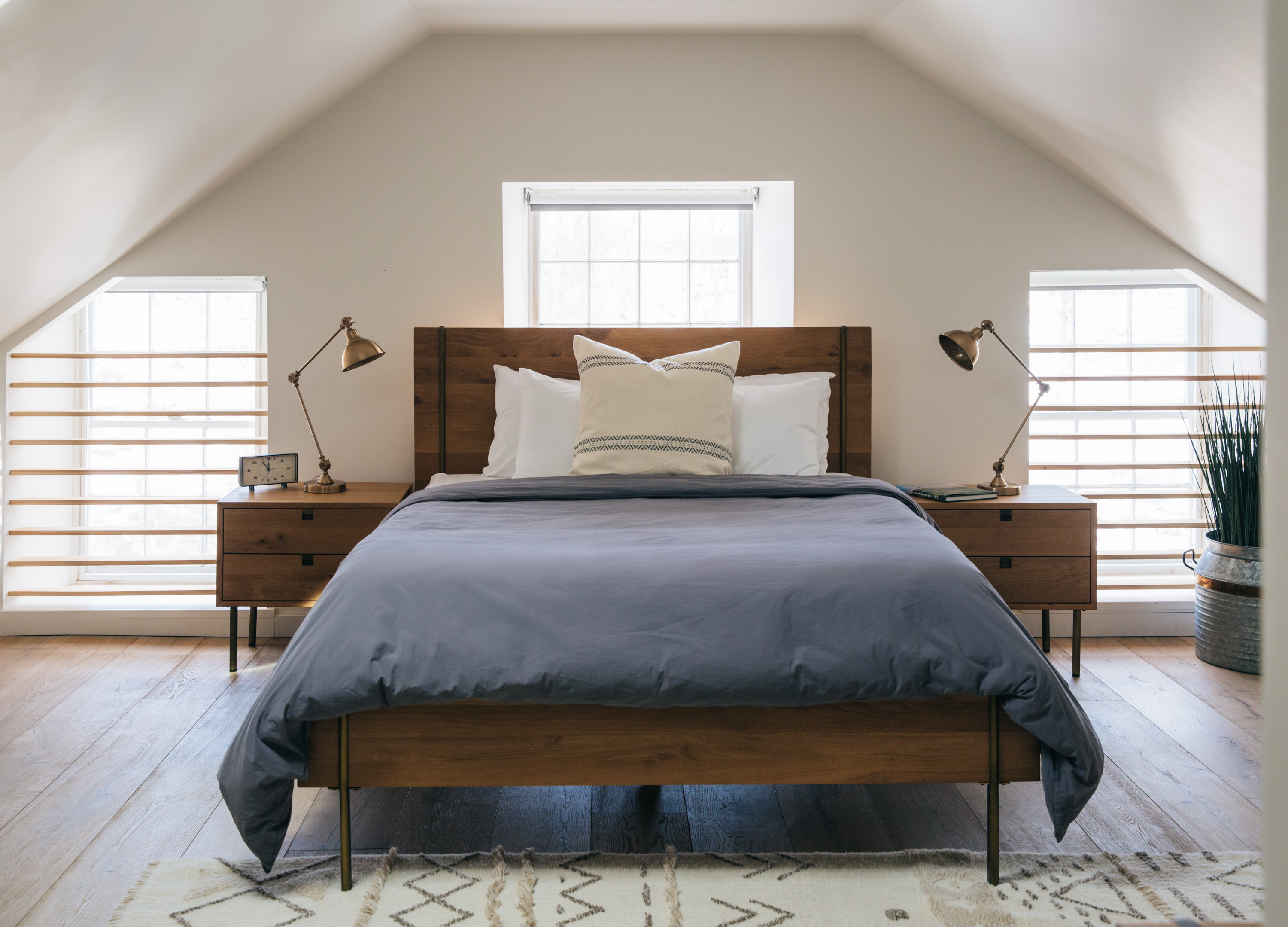
Waterfalls Suite, The Rooms at The Stone Mill

The Frog Hollow Stone Mill, or as it is now referred to, The Stone Mill, is a historic industrial building at 3 Mill Street in Middlebury, Vermont. Built in 1840, it is an important local reminder of the town's industrial past, and was listed on the National Register of Historic Places in 1973. It presently houses a restaurant, a public market, event space and four hotel rooms as part of an extensive renovation conducted in 2019.

== Description and history ==
The former Frog Hollow Stone Mill stands on the south bank of Otter Creek, at a point where the normally north-flowing river bends to the west. The mill is located a short way west of downtown Middlebury. The building is four stories in height, and is built out of locally quarried stone laid in irregular courses. It is covered by a gabled roof. The main facade, facing south toward Mill Street, is symmetrical, with recessed loading bay entrances at the center of each level, flanked on each side by sash windows. A loading boom projects above the top level in the gable. The interior of the building, including some of its internal structural elements, reflect alterations due primarily to a history of fires with which it was plagued.

Industrial use of the mill site began early in Middlebury's history, with a grist mill built there in 1789. In 1812, the mill was converted to cotton textile production, and in 1835 the Middlebury Manufacturing Company was founded. The present building was erected in 1840, and underwent a number of ownership changes, fires, and other alterations into the 20th century. It was acquired by the town in the early 1970s, and was a student art space for Middlebury College.

In 2019 the College sold the property to Community Barn Real Estate, a local development firm owned by Stacey Rainey and Mary Cullinane. After approximately a year of renovations, including making the building ADA accessible, The Stone Mill was re-opened as a central hub for Addison County locals and visitors alike. With a boutique hotel, event space, a public market and The Mad Taco, this historic building has been re-invented once again.

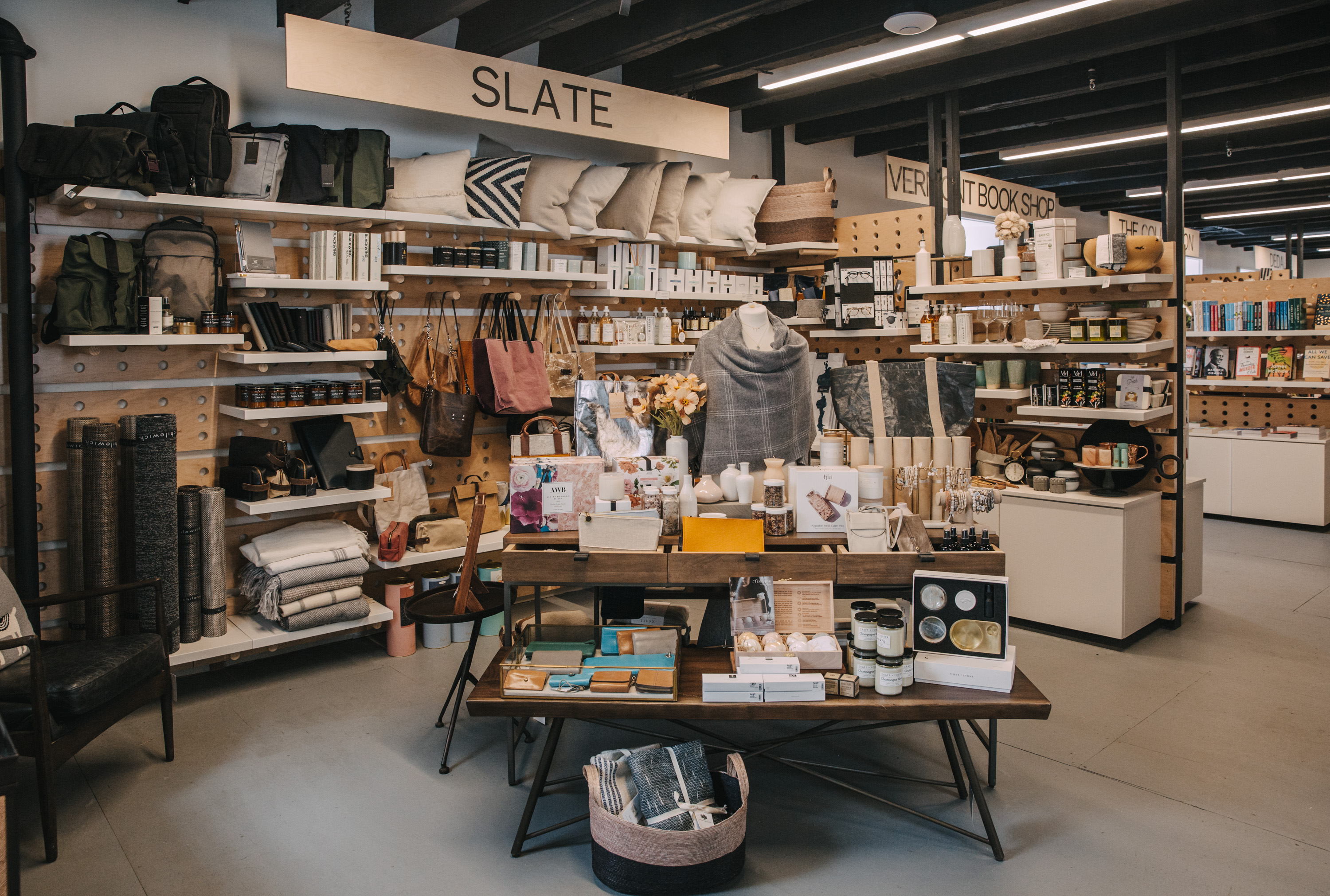
Public Market Retail Floor

== See also ==
- National Register of Historic Places listings in Addison County, Vermont
