= Whiting, Vermont =

- Town
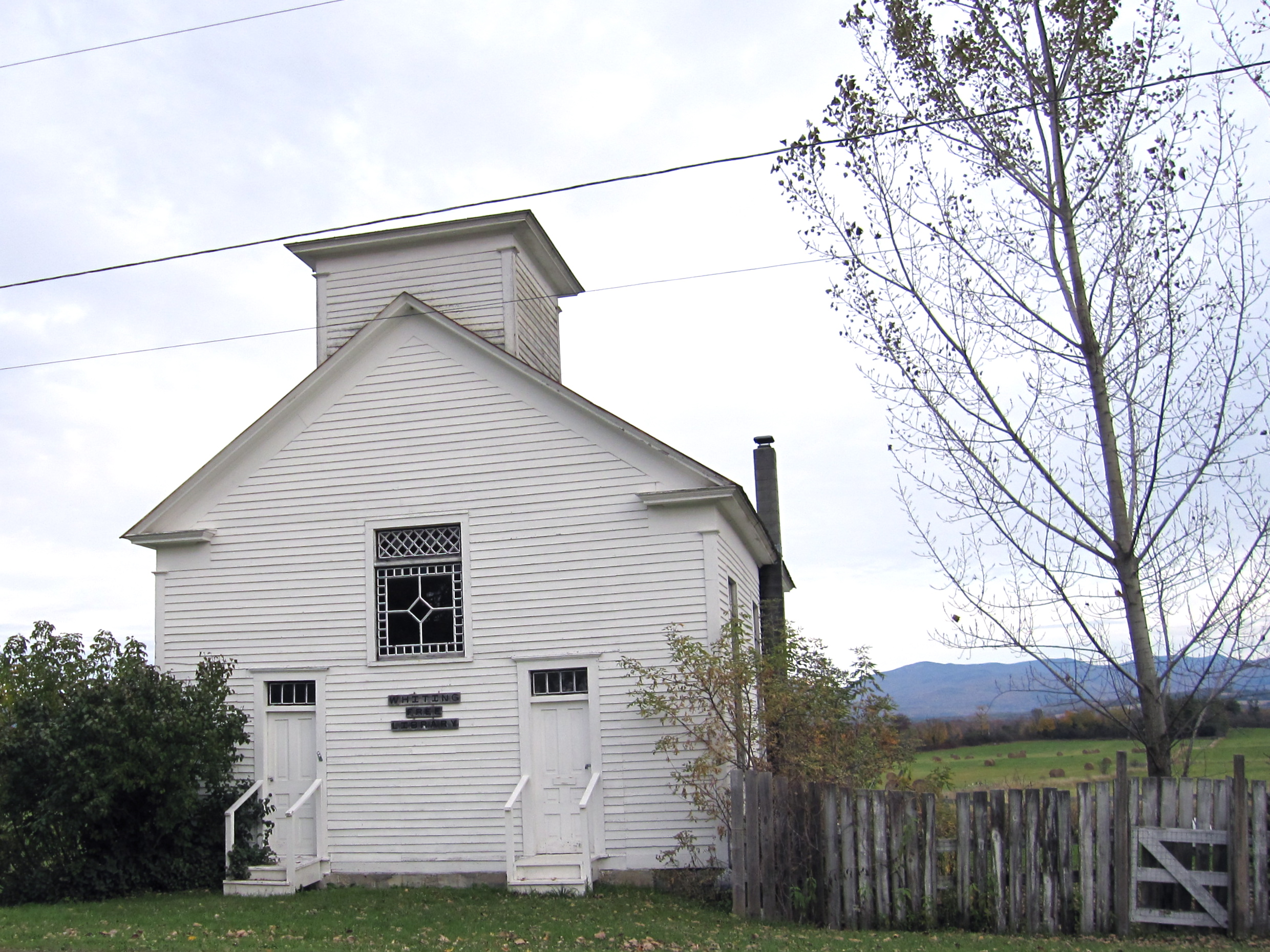
- Whiting Free Library

- Seal

- Location in Addison County and the state of Vermont
- Coordinates: 43°52′42″N 73°12′14″W
- Country: United States
- State: Vermont
- County: Addison

Area
  - Total: 13.7 sq mi (35.5 km^{2})
  - Land: 13.6 sq mi (35.2 km^{2})
  - Water: 0.12 sq mi (0.3 km^{2})
- Elevation: 367 ft (112 m)

Population (2020)
  - Total: 405
  - Density: 30/sq mi (11.5/km^{2})
- Time zone: UTC-5 (Eastern (EST))
  - Summer (DST): UTC-4 (EDT)
- ZIP code: 05778
- Area code: 802
- FIPS code: 50-83800
- GNIS feature ID: 1462260
- Website: www.whitingvt.com

Whiting is a town in Addison County, Vermont, United States. The town was named for John Whiting, a landholder. The population was 405 at the 2020 census.

== Geography ==
Whiting is located in southern Addison County, in the southern reaches of the Champlain Valley. It is bordered by the town of Orwell to the southwest, Shoreham to the west, Cornwall to the north, and Salisbury and Leicester to the east. To the south is Rutland County, with the town of Sudbury to the south and Brandon to the southeast. Otter Creek forms most of the eastern border of Whiting.

According to the United States Census Bureau, the town has a total area of 13.7 square miles (35.5 km^{2}), of which 13.6 square miles (35.2 km^{2}) is land and 0.12 square miles (0.3 km^{2}), or 0.90%, is water.

== Demographics ==
Historical population
Census	Pop.	Note	%±
1790	250		—
1800	404		61.6%
1810	565		39.9%
1820	609		7.8%
1830	653		7.2%
1840	660		1.1%
1850	629		−4.7%
1860	542		−13.8%
1870	430		−20.7%
1880	455		5.8%
1890	355		−22.0%
1900	361		1.7%
1910	348		−3.6%
1920	302		−13.2%
1930	358		18.5%
1940	312		−12.8%
1950	282		−9.6%
1960	304		7.8%
1970	359		18.1%
1980	379		5.6%
1990	407		7.4%
2000	380		−6.6%
2010	419		10.3%
2020	405		−3.3%
U.S. Decennial Census

As of the census of 2000, there were 380 people, 155 households, and 101 families residing in the town. The population density was 27.8 people per square mile (10.7/km^{2}). There were 167 housing units at an average density of 12.2 per square mile (4.7/km^{2}). The racial makeup of the town was 97.37% White, 0.26% African American, 0.26% Asian, 0.79% from other races, and 1.32% from two or more races. Hispanic or Latino of any race were 0.79% of the population.

There were 155 households, out of which 31.0% had children under the age of 18 living with them, 52.9% were married couples living together, 5.8% had a female householder with no husband present, and 34.8% were non-families. 24.5% of all households were made up of individuals, and 9.7% had someone living alone who was 65 years of age or older. The average household size was 2.45 and the average family size was 2.96.

In the town, the age distribution of the population shows 23.4% under the age of 18, 7.9% from 18 to 24, 31.6% from 25 to 44, 24.7% from 45 to 64, and 12.4% who were 65 years of age or older. The median age was 39 years. For every 100 females, there were 104.3 males. For every 100 females age 18 and over, there were 104.9 males.

The median income for a household in the town was $31,985, and the median income for a family was $41,250. Males had a median income of $26,250 versus $26,563 for females. The per capita income for the town was $20,101. About 3.8% of families and 4.7% of the population were below the poverty line, including 4.9% of those under age 18 and 9.8% of those age 65 or over.

== Notable people ==
- Asher P. Nichols, lawyer and politician
- Philetus Sawyer, US congressman and senator from Wisconsin
- Lucy Hall Washington, poet, social reformer
- Jarvis White, Wisconsin State Assemblyman
