= Richard Everett =

American explorer

Richard Everett (December 11, 1597 – July 3, 1682) emigrated from the English county of Essex. On July 15, 1636 he and a party of settlers bought land from Native American on the Connecticut River at Agawan – now Springfield, Massachusetts.

Everett and his wife Mary Winch had six children, and he had five children from an earlier marriage. Notable descendants include Edward Everett, Edward Everett Hale, Bill Everett and Horace Everett.

== See also ==
- Springfield, Massachusetts
