= Elsa Barker =

American writer

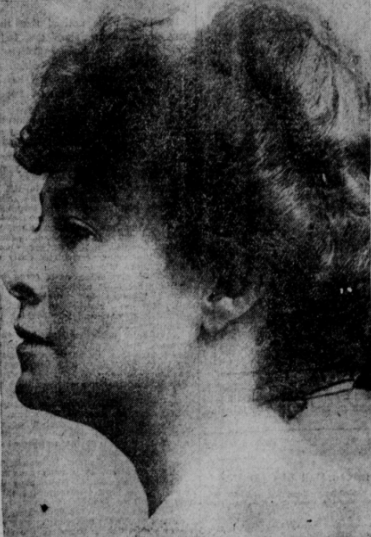
- Born: 1869; Leicester, Vermont, United States
- Died: 1954 (aged 84–85)
- Occupations: Novelist; short-story writer; poet
- Writing career
- Language: English

Elsa Barker (1869–1954) was an American novelist, short-story writer and poet. She became best known for Letters from a Living Dead Man (1914), War Letters from the Living Dead Man (1915), and Last Letters From the Living Dead Man (1919), books containing what she said were messages from a dead man produced through automatic writing.

== Biography ==
Barker was born in 1869 in Leicester, Vermont to Albert G. and Louise Marie Barker, both of whom died while she was young. Her earliest work was as a shorthand reporter, teacher, and newspaper writer. She was an editor of the Consolidated Encyclopedia Library in 1901, was a lecturer for the New York Board of Education in 1904-1905, and was on the editorial staff of Hamptons magazine in 1909-1910. She also authored a "labor play", The Scab, produced in New York and Boston in 1904-1906. Her first novel, The Son of Mary Bethel, was published in 1909.

Barker's father had been interested in the occult and she shared this interest, becoming a member of the Theosophical Society. She also was initiated into the Rosicrucian Order of Alpha et Omega.

Barker lived in Europe from 1910 to 1914, first in Paris and then in London. She was in London at the outbreak of World War I. In 1912, while in Paris, she felt compelled to write a passage, although she said she did not know where the words came from. She said she was "strongly impelled to take up a pencil and write." She signed the passage "X", which at first meant nothing to her. She was told that "X" was the nickname of a Los Angeles judge called David P. Hatch and then discovered that Hatch had died before she "received" the message. In 1914 she published a book of these messages called Letters from a Living Dead Man. She said that the passages were genuine messages from the dead man and Hatch's son also believed that the communications were from his father. She published two more volumes of Hatch's messages — War Letters from the Living Dead Man (1915), and Last Letters From the Living Dead Man (1919).

Around the time of the publication of War Letters from the Living Dead Man in 1915, Barker developed an interest in psychoanalysis. By 1919 she was studying 14 hours a day. From 1928 to 1930 she lived on the French Riviera. Barker died August 31, 1954.

== Selected works ==
- The Son of Mary Bethel (1909)
- The Frozen Grail & Other Poems (1910)
- Stories from the New Testament for Children (1911)
- The Book of Love (1912)
- Letters from a Living Dead Man (1914, 1920)
- War Letters from the Living Dead Man (1915)
- Songs of a Vagrom Angel (1916)
- Last Letters From the Living Dead Man (1919)
- Fielding Sargent (1922)
- The Cobra Candlestick (1928)
- The C.I.D. of Dexter Drake (1929)
- The Redman Cave Murder (1930)
