= George Edward Wales =

American politician (1792-1860)

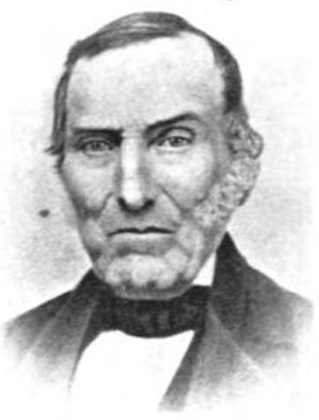
- George E. Wales, Member of Congress from Vermont

Member of the United States House of Representatives from Vermont's 3rd district
- In office March 4, 1825 – March 3, 1829
- Preceded by: Henry Olin
- Succeeded by: Horace Everett

Member of the Vermont House of Representatives
- In office 1822–1824

Personal details
- Born: May 13, 1792 Westminster, Vermont, U.S.
- Died: January 8, 1860 (aged 67) Hartford, Vermont, U.S.
- Party: Whig Party (United States)
- Spouse: Amanda Lathrop Wales
- Education: Dartmouth College, University of Vermont
- Profession: Politician, lawyer

George Edward Wales (May 13, 1792 – January 8, 1860) was an American politician from Vermont who served as a U.S. representative.

== Biography ==
Wales was born in Westminster, Vermont, and attended the common schools in Westminster. He studied law with Stephen R. Bradley in Westminster and with Titus Hutchinson (who later served as chief justice of the Vermont Supreme Court) in Woodstock, and was admitted to the bar in 1812. He moved to Hartford, Vermont, in 1813 and began the practice of law.

He served as clerk and treasurer of the White River Bridge Company from 1818 until 1825. He was a member of the Vermont House of Representatives from 1822 until 1824, and served as speaker in 1822, 1823 and 1824.

Wales earned honorary degrees from Dartmouth College in 1823 and the University of Vermont in 1825.

Wales was elected to the United States House of Representatives as a National Republican and served in the Nineteenth and Twentieth Congresses, March 4, 1825, to March 3, 1829. He was an unsuccessful candidate for reelection in 1828 to the Twenty-First Congress. After leaving Congress he resumed the practice of law.

He later joined the Whig Party. Wales was elected town clerk in Hartford in 1840, and served in that position until his death. From 1847 to 1850 he was judge of the Probate Court for the district which included Windsor County.

Wales was a trustee of Norwich University from 1845 until 1857.

== Personal life ==
Wales married Amanda Lathrop Wales in 1813, and they had seven children.

He joined the Free and Accepted Masons of the State of Vermont in 1812, and was the state Grand Master from 1825 to 1827.

== Death ==
Wales died on January 8, 1860, in Hartford.

Political offices
Preceded by D. Azro A. Buck	Speaker of the Vermont House of Representatives; 1822–1824	Succeeded by Isaac Fletcher
U.S. House of Representatives
Preceded by Henry Olin	Member of the U.S. House of Representatives from Vermont's 3rd congressional district 1825-1829	Succeeded by Horace Everett
