= USS LST-31 =

Tank landing ship of the United States Navy

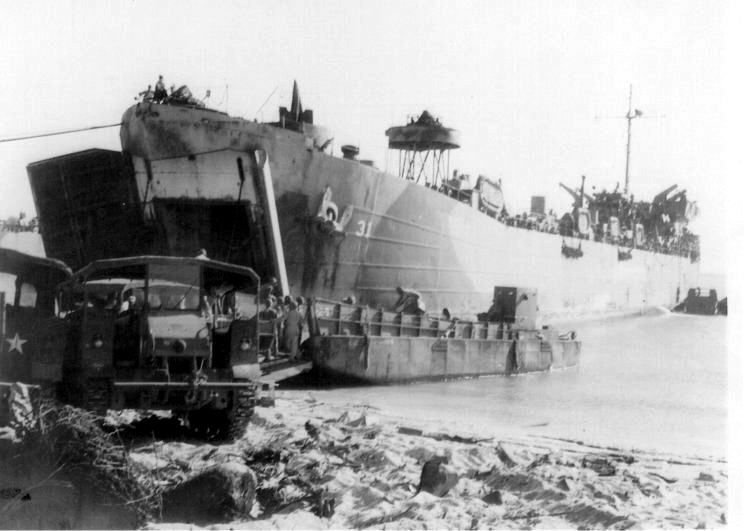
- LST-31 off-loading over the beach at Englhi Island, Eniwetok Atoll, Marshall Islands, c. February–March 1944

History

United States
- Name: LST-31
- Builder: Dravo Corporation, Pittsburgh, Pennsylvania
- Laid down: 2 February 1943
- Launched: 5 June 1943
- Sponsored by: Mrs. Maurice Endres
- Commissioned: 10 July 1943, reduced commission; 21 July 1943, full commission
- Decommissioned: 8 January 1946
- Identification: Hull symbol: LST-31; Code letters: NFPJ
- Honors and awards: 5 × battle stars
- Fate: Loaned to Japan 1946

Japan
- Name: Q005
- Operator: Shipping Control Authority for Japan
- In service: 8 January 1946
- Out of service: date unknown
- Fate: Returned to US Naval custody, 1948

United States
- Name: LST-31 (1948–1955); Addison County (1955)
- Namesake: Addison County, Vermont
- Renamed: Addison County, 1 July 1955
- Stricken: 11 August 1955
- Fate: Sunk as target

General characteristics
- Type: LST-1-class tank landing ship
- Displacement: 4,080 long tons (4,145 t) full load; 2,160 long tons (2,190 t) landing
- Length: 328 ft (100 m) oa
- Beam: 50 ft (15 m)
- Draft: Full load: 8 ft 2 in (2.49 m) forward; 14 ft 1 in (4.29 m) aft; Landing at 2,160 t: 3 ft 11 in (1.19 m) forward; 9 ft 10 in (3.00 m) aft
- Installed power: 2 × 900 hp (670 kW) Electro-Motive Diesel 12-567A diesel engines; 1,700 shp (1,300 kW)
- Propulsion: 1 × Falk main reduction gears; 2 × Propellers
- Speed: 12 kn (22 km/h; 14 mph)
- Range: 24,000 nmi (44,000 km; 28,000 mi) at 9 kn (17 km/h; 10 mph) while displacing 3,960 long tons (4,024 t)
- Boats & landing craft carried: 2 or 6 x LCVPs
- Capacity: 2,100 tons oceangoing maximum; 350 tons main deckload
- Troops: 16 officers, 147 enlisted men
- Complement: 13 officers, 104 enlisted men
- Armament: Varied, ultimate armament; 2 × twin 40 mm (1.57 in) Bofors guns; 4 × single 40 mm Bofors guns; 12 × 20 mm (0.79 in) Oerlikon cannons

Service record
- Part of: LST Flotilla 3
- Operations: Gilbert Islands operation (20 November–5 December 1943); Marshall Islands operation; Occupation of Kwajalein and Majuro Atolls (31 January–8 February 1944); Occupation of Eniwetok Atoll (19 February–2 March 1944); Marianas operation; Capture and occupation of Saipan (15 June–10 August 1944); Tinian capture and occupation (24 July–10 August 1944); Assault and occupation of Okinawa Gunto (3–22 May 1945)
- Awards: Combat Action Ribbon; American Campaign Medal; Asiatic–Pacific Campaign Medal; World War II Victory Medal; Navy Occupation Service Medal w/Asia Clasp; Philippine Liberation Medal

USS LST-31 was a United States Navy LST-1-class tank landing ship used exclusively in the Asiatic-Pacific Theater during World War II. Like many of her class, she was not originally named and is properly referred to by her hull designation. Later she was named for Addison County, Vermont. She was the only US Naval vessel to bear the name.

== Construction ==
LST-31 was laid down on 2 February 1943 at Pittsburgh by the Dravo Corporation; launched on 5 June 1943; sponsored by Mrs. Maurice Endres; accepted by the Navy and placed in reduced commission on 10 July 1943; and sailed to New Orleans, where she was placed in full commission on 21 July 1943.

== Service history ==
The new tank landing ship got underway on 29 July, for Panama City, Florida, where she conducted a series of beaching exercises. LST-31 returned to New Orleans, on 7 August, to take on cargo for transportation to the Pacific. After a brief port call at Guantánamo Bay, Cuba, she transited the Panama Canal, on 24 August, and joined the US Pacific Fleet. She then continued on to San Diego, where she arrived on 13 September.

After participating in beaching exercises in the San Diego area, the ship stopped at Port Hueneme, and at San Francisco, to take on cargo. She left the west coast on 15 October, bound for Hawaii, reached Pearl Harbor on 25 October, and began unloading. When this task was completed, LST-31 again weighed anchor on 5 November, and shaped a course for the Gilbert Islands. As a member of 5th Amphibious Force, the ship was slated to take part in the assault on Makin Island. LST-31 arrived off Makin, on 20 November, and began discharging troops and cargo ashore. She remained off that atoll until 3 December, when she got underway to return to Pearl Harbor. Shortly after her arrival, the vessel entered the Pearl Harbor Navy Yard for repairs and alterations. While her engines were being overhauled, additional 40 mm (1.57 in) Bofors guns and 20 mm (0.79 in) Oerlikon cannons were installed. The yard period ended in early January 1944, and the refurbished vessel then took part in training exercises off Maui, in preparation for the forthcoming invasion of the Marshall Islands.

The tank landing ship left Pearl Harbor on 19 January and set a course for Kwajalein. She anchored off that atoll on 1 February, and began discharging her cargo in support of operations in the Marshalls. On 12 February, the ship began embarking troops for the invasion of Eniwetok and, five days later, sortied with LST Group 8. She beached at Eniwetok, on 20 February, and began landing her soldiers and discharging cargo ashore. LST-31 remained there until 20 March, when she got underway for Hawaii. She stopped en route at Kwajalein and Tarawa, to take on cargo and passengers and finally reached Pearl Harbor on 15 April. Following repairs in dry dock there, she resumed operations on 10 May, with a series of training exercises in Hapuna Bay, Hawaii. On 25 May, LST-31 left Hawaiian waters, bound for Eniwetok. Upon her arrival at that atoll on 7 June, she refueled and took on cargo in preparation for operations against Saipan. The vessel arrived off Saipan, on 14 June, and began discharging troops and supplies ashore. She cleared the area on 23 June, and returned to Eniwetok to replenish her cargo.

LST-31 arrived back at Saipan on 17 July; unloaded supplies and small craft; and, during the next few weeks, served as a hospital ship. At night, she anchored off Saipan to receive casualties and was underway off Tinian, during daylight hours. This assignment occupied the ship through 21 August, when she began a round-trip voyage to Eniwetok. After returning to Saipan, the vessel underwent three days of voyage repairs and got underway on 23 September, for the west coast of the United States. En route, she touched at Eniwetok; Apamama and Makin Islands, Gilbert Islands; and Pearl Harbor. She left the latter port on 6 November, and reached San Francisco on 17 November 1944. After one day in port there, LST-31 sailed to San Pedro, to enter the West Coast Shipbuilding Company yards for extensive alterations and repairs.

The ship left the yard in early February 1945, conducted sea trials, and arrived at the Mare Island Navy Yard, Vallejo, California, on 18 February, to take on an amphibious craft. She then visited Seattle for additional repair work. On 10 March, the vessel got underway for Hawaii and reached Pearl Harbor on 23 March.

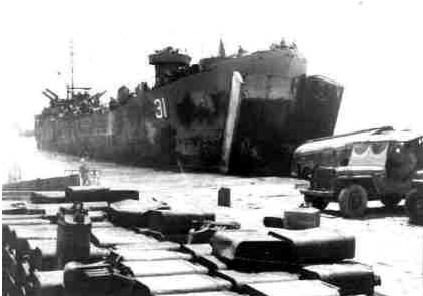
LST-31 off-loading over the beach at Okinawa, July 1945.

LST-31 left Hawaii on 4 April, for Okinawa. She embarked passengers and loaded supplies at Eniwetok and Guam, before proceeding on to the Ryūkyūs, and anchoring in waters off southwestern Okinawa on 3 May. She remained in the area for approximately three weeks providing logistic support to troops fighting on Okinawa. The ship arrived at Ulithi on 28 May; took on cargo; and, on 2 June, set a course for the island of Leyte, in the Philippines. During the months of June, July, and August, LST-31 operated between the Philippines and Okinawa, transporting supplies and troops between the two points to build up Okinawa as a base for the conquest of the Japanese home islands. However, this invasion was obviated when Japan capitulated on 15 August. The ship then began moving occupation troops and equipment to Japan from various points in the Philippines. She first arrived in Japanese waters on 15 September, when she dropped anchor in Tokyo Bay.

On 30 November, LST-31 was assigned to duty in Japan with the 5th Fleet, Amphibious Group 11, LST Flotilla 35. However, these orders were superseded late in December; and the ship was slated for decommissioning. She was scheduled to be turned over to the Japanese merchant marine to be manned by a Japanese crew under American control for use in repatriating Japanese citizens and shuttling supplies between Japanese ports.

== Post-war service ==
After the ship was stripped of all armament and other wartime equipment, LST-31 was decommissioned on 8 January 1946, and transferred to the Japanese. The vessel operated under Japanese control into May 1948, when she was returned to US Naval custody. She left Yokohama on 3 May, and shaped a course for the west coast of the United States. The tank landing ship was later berthed in the Seattle area. On 1 July 1955, LST-31 was named Addison County. Her name was struck from the Naval Vessel Register on 11 August 1955, and she was subsequently sunk as a target.

== Awards ==
LST-31 earned five battle stars for her World War II service.

== Bibliography ==
- "LST-31". Dictionary of American Naval Fighting Ships. Naval History and Heritage Command. 30 July 2015. This article incorporates text from this source, which is in the public domain.
- "Addison County (LST-31)". Dictionary of American Naval Fighting Ships. Naval History and Heritage Command. 9 July 2015. This article incorporates text from this source, which is in the public domain.
- "USS LST-31". NavSource. 4 April 2014.
