= Bristol (CDP), Vermont =

Census-designated place in Vermont, United States

- Census-designated place
- Location in Addison County and the state of Vermont
- Coordinates: 44°07′50″N 73°05′23″W
- Country: United States
- State: Vermont
- County: Addison
- Town: Bristol

Area
  - Total: 2.15 sq mi (5.58 km^{2})
  - Land: 2.13 sq mi (5.51 km^{2})
  - Water: 0.027 sq mi (0.07 km^{2})
- Elevation: 548 ft (167 m)

Population (2020)
  - Total: 1,936
  - Density: 910/sq mi (351/km^{2})
- Time zone: UTC-5 (Eastern (EST))
  - Summer (DST): UTC-4 (EDT)
- ZIP code: 05443
- Area code: 802
- FIPS code: 50-08950
- GNIS feature ID: 2378124

Bristol is the main settlement in the town of Bristol in Addison County, Vermont, United States, and a census-designated place (CDP). The population was 1,936 at the 2020 census, out of a total population of 3,782 in the town of Bristol.

== Geography ==
The Bristol CDP is located in the northwest part of the town of Bristol, on the north side of the New Haven River as it exits the Green Mountains to the east. Vermont Route 17 passes through the community, leading west 5 miles (8 km) to U.S. Route 7 at New Haven Junction and east across the Green Mountains through Appalachian Gap 20 miles (32 km) to Waitsfield. Vermont Route 116 runs with VT 17 through Bristol but leads north 8 miles (13 km) to Starksboro and south 12 miles (19 km) to East Middlebury.

According to the United States Census Bureau, the Bristol CDP has a total area of 2.15 square miles (5.58 km^{2}), of which 2.13 square miles (5.51 km^{2}) is land and 0.03 square miles (0.07 km^{2}), or 1.24%, is water.
