= Satan's Kingdom, Massachusetts =

- Village
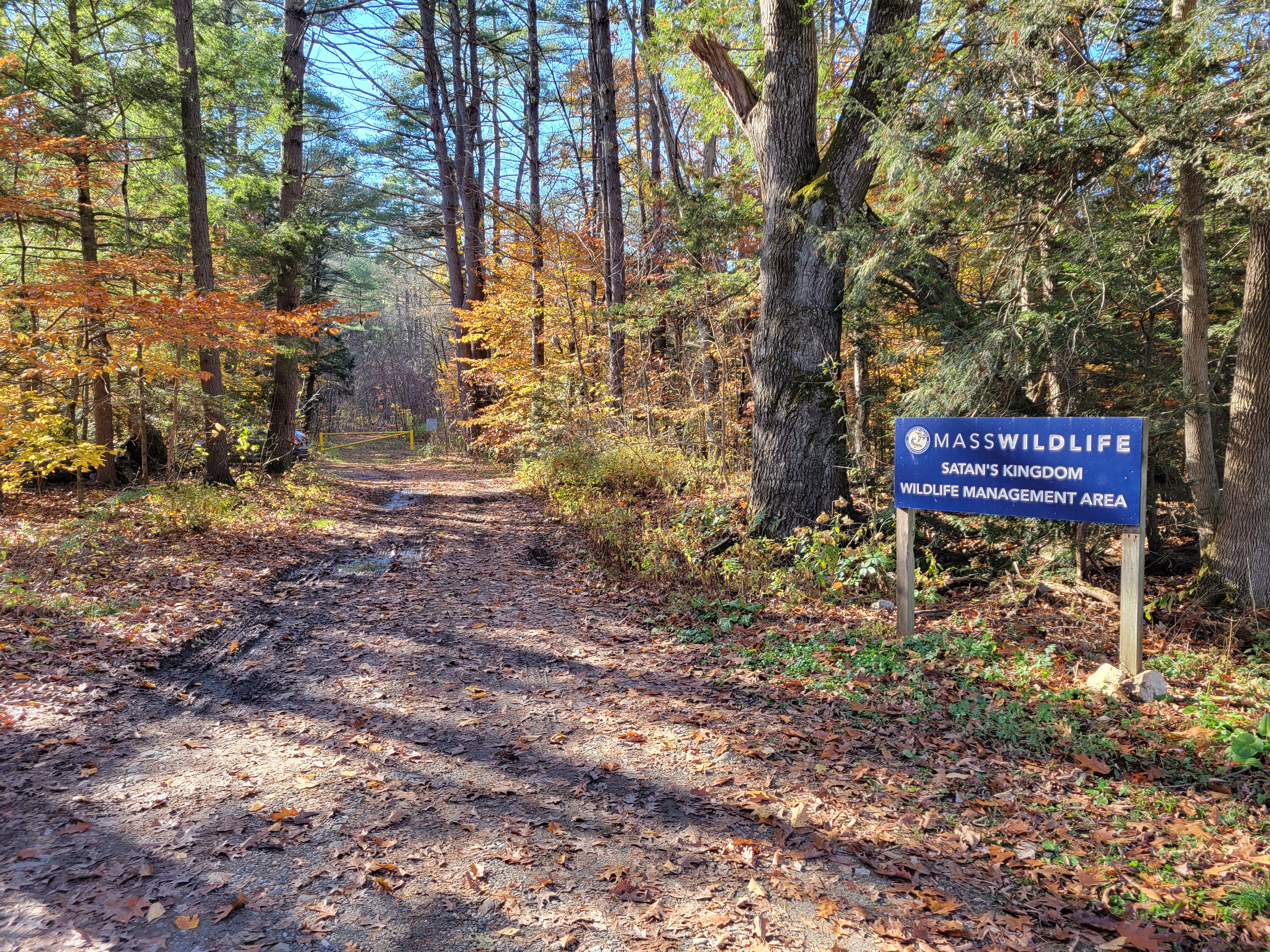
- Satan's Kingdom Wildlife Management Area

- Location in Massachusetts Satan's Kingdom (the United States)
- Coordinates: 42°42′45″N 72°28′48″W
- Country: United States
- State: Massachusetts
- County: Franklin
- Town: Northfield
- Satan's Kingdom: 1958
- Elevation: 374 ft (114 m)
- Time zone: UTC-5 (Eastern (EST))
  - Summer (DST): UTC-4 (EDT)
- Area code: 413
- GNIS feature ID: 609340

Satan's Kingdom is an unincorporated village in the town of Northfield, Franklin County, Massachusetts, United States. Satan's Kingdom is 1.5 miles (2.4 km) northwest of the Northfield CDP and is near the Vermont border.

== Name ==
Satan's Kingdom has been noted for its unusual place name. Stories say that it was named Satan's Kingdom after a resident of Northfield walked out of a church where a sermon about the fires of hell had just been given and saw a forest fire across the Connecticut River, and observed that Satan's Kingdom was burning. It has also been suggested that the name originated from the village's reputation for dangerous wildlife, such as venomous snakes. Satan's Kingdom is not a census designated or incorporated place having an official federally recognized name.

== History ==
Satan's Kingdom was the site of multiple attacks in the King Philip's War during the 1670s.

== Geography ==
Much of Satan's Kingdom is occupied by the Satan's Kingdom Wildlife Management Area, a wildlife management area set aside by the Massachusetts Division of Fisheries and Wildlife. The area is 1,800 acres, and is popular with hikers.

== See also ==
- Satans Kingdom, Vermont
