= East Middlebury, Vermont =

Census-designated place in Vermont, United States

- Census-designated place
- Location in Addison County and the state of Vermont
- Coordinates: 43°58′29″N 73°06′19″W
- Country: United States
- State: Vermont
- County: Addison
- Town: Middlebury

Area
  - Total: 0.724 sq mi (1.88 km^{2})
  - Land: 0.709 sq mi (1.84 km^{2})
  - Water: 0.015 sq mi (0.039 km^{2})
- Elevation: 410 ft (120 m)

Population (2010)
  - Total: 425
  - Density: 599/sq mi (231/km^{2})
- Time zone: UTC-5 (Eastern (EST))
  - Summer (DST): UTC-4 (EDT)
- ZIP code: 05740
- Area code: 802
- GNIS feature ID: 2586629

East Middlebury is a census-designated place in the town of Middlebury, Addison County, Vermont, United States. As of the 2020 census, East Middlebury had a population of 426.

== History ==
East Middlebury first came to the attention of settlers from British America after the French and Indian War. The charter that created Middlebury dates from 1761 and the earliest settlement in East Middlebury dates from 1775 when Ebar Evarts cleared land for the construction of a tavern, the forerunner of today’s Waybury Inn. Jonathan Foot began the development of the area of the Middlebury River Gorge in 1790. The development of the village was encouraged by its location at the west end of the trail over the Green Mountains as it entered into the Otter Creek Valley. The Middlebury River Gorge was also a prime area for waterpower for mills located along its banks. The first mill of many built in the town, was a sawmill on the south side of the river near the top of gorge. This area was also the site of The East Middlebury Iron Works (1831-1890) and was the last iron works in Vermont to close its doors. The river also powered a grist mill, a wool finishing mill, and a tannery. In 1810, Jonathan Foot built a “place of entertainment” (the Waybury) that also served as a stagecoach stop for traffic coming over the mountain pass. By 1812 the village had added a general store. Epaphras Jones, who had established the Vermont Glass Factory Company at Lake Dunmore, built another glass production facility in East Middlebury in 1814. The building was a circular brick construction located just west of the Waybury and across the street (the site of St. Barnabas Chapel. In 1821, the community had ten dwellings, an Inn, and a few shops. Growth continued, so that in 1850 there were 50 homes in the village. Norman Tupper built a grist mill further south on the river. This facility was purchased by the Brown Novelty Company in 1915 for making wooden toys. It is believed that the former Episcopal Rectory (Partridge House) is the oldest dwelling house in the village. It may be the original house built by Jonathan Foot. The Foote/Zahn’s house was the house built by Epaphras Jones, who had his glass factory just across the street from the dwelling.

Established by statute, the East Middlebury Prudential Committee is an independently-elected legislative body (unaffiliated with the Middlebury Selectboard) that governs East Middlebury's Fire District #1 and manages the East Middlebury water system. Among its duties, the Prudential Committee establishes water rates for residents and businesses in East Middlebury. As factories and small businesses have left East Middlebury, it continues to be a place next to the river and below the Green Mountains. The village has had major floods (1927, 1937 and in 2011).
