= Lake Dunmore =

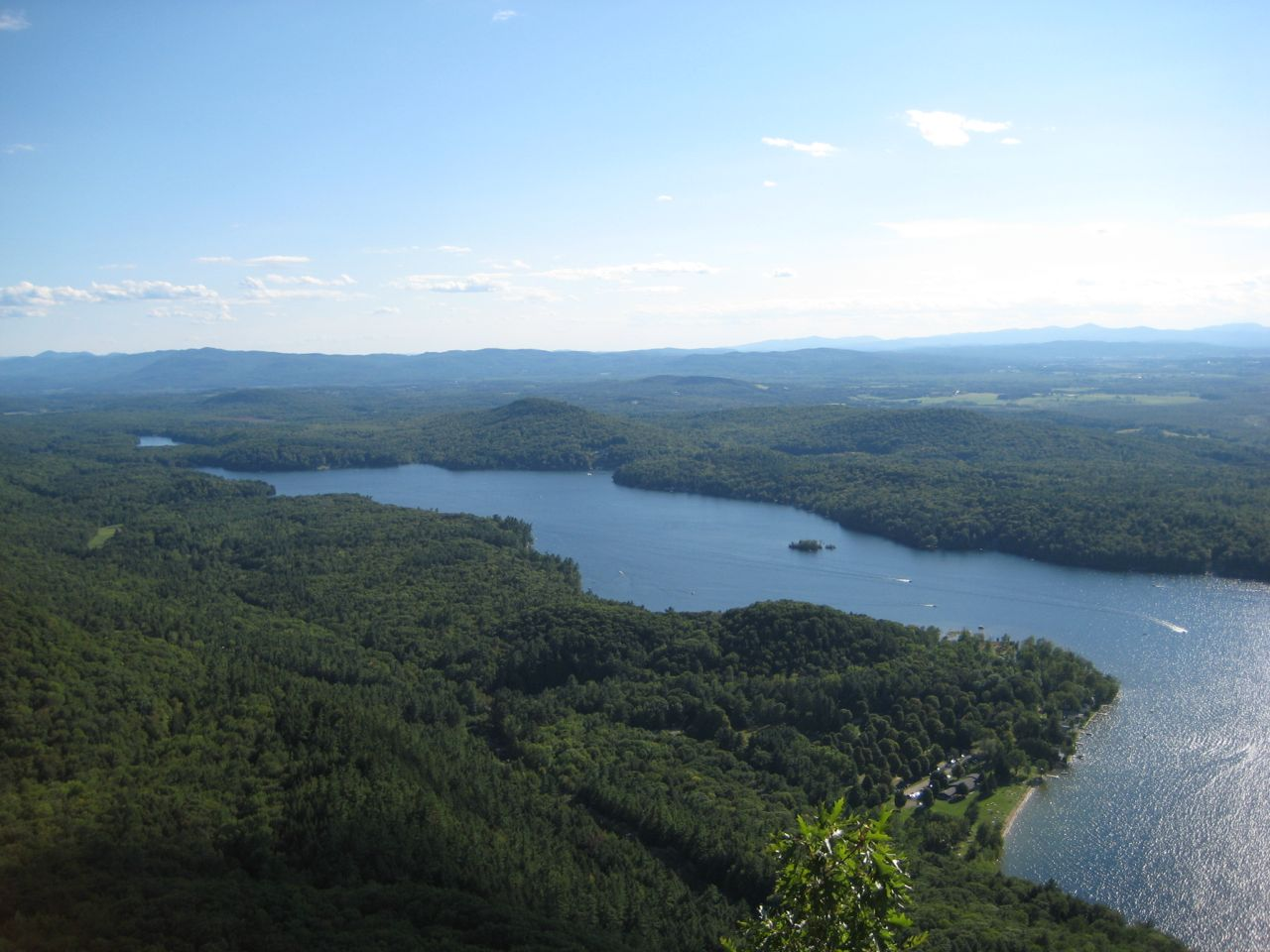

- Location within Vermont Location within the United States
- Location: Addison County, Vermont
- Coordinates: 43.9°N 73.07°W
- Type: Natural freshwater lake
- Basin countries: United States
- Max. length: 2.06 mi (3.32 km)
- Max. width: 0.61 mi (0.98 km)
- Surface area: 985 acres (3.99 km^{2})
- Max. depth: 105 feet (32 m)
- Surface elevation: 559 ft (170 m)
- Islands: 1 islet
- Settlements: towns of Salisbury, Vermont and Leicester, Vermont

Lake Dunmore is a freshwater lake in Addison County, Vermont. The lake spans the towns of Salisbury and Leicester and has a surface area of 985 acres (3.98 km^{2}). Lake Dunmore is over 3 miles long (oriented north-south) and up to 1 mile wide. The primary source of water is Sucker Brook, which rises in the adjacent Moosalamoo National Recreation Area of the Green Mountain National Forest. The lake is drained by Leicester River, a tributary to Otter Creek, which in turn empties into Lake Champlain.

Branbury State Park occupies 69 acres (28 hectares) of the eastern shore and offers a sandy beach, canoe rentals, and campsites. Vermont Route 53 follows the eastern and northern shores of the lake. Most of the shoreline is privately owned.

Keewaydin (camp) operates two camps on Lake Dunmore. Keewaydin Dunmore for boys was established in 1910. Songadeewin, a camp for girls, was established in 1999.

Point CounterPoint, a chamber music camp established in 1963, operates on the western shore of Lake Dunmore.

The Lake Dunmore/Fern Lake Association, Incorporated "protects the Lakes’ value as a public recreational facility and respects the interests of property owners and the public".

Although a natural lake formed by glaciation, the water level is controlled by a small dam. In addition, Sucker Brook is part of a hydroelectricity project connecting Silver Lake and Sugar Hill Reservoir via Sucker Brook and operated by Green Mountain Power.

There have been conservation efforts to protect the loons who nest on Lake Dunmore. In 2022, Mike Korkuc was awarded the Green Mountain Power-Zetterstrom Environmental Award for his Loon recovery conservation work at Lake Dunmore.

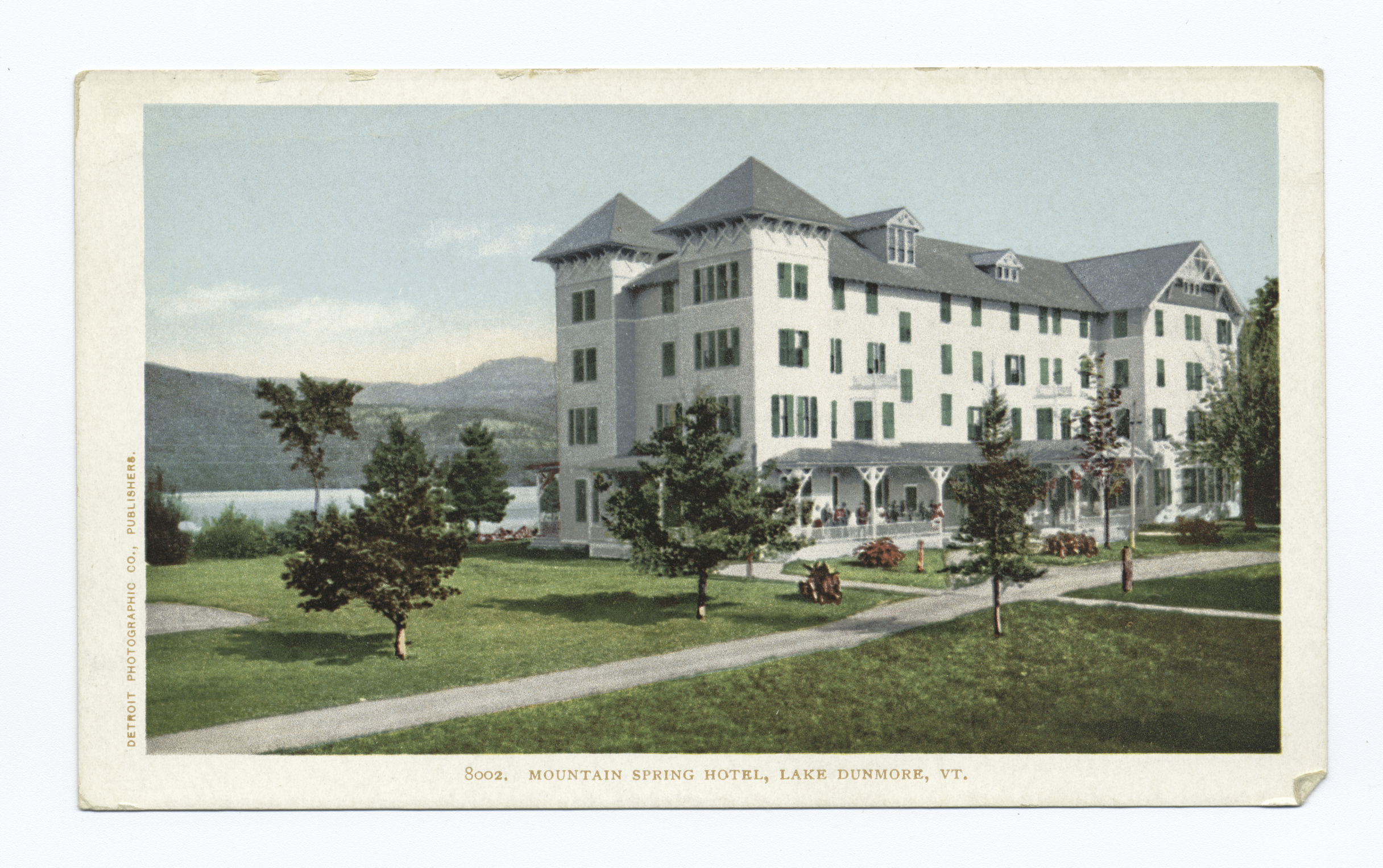
Mountain Spring Hotel, Lake Dunmore, early 20th century
