= Salisbury, Vermont =

- Town
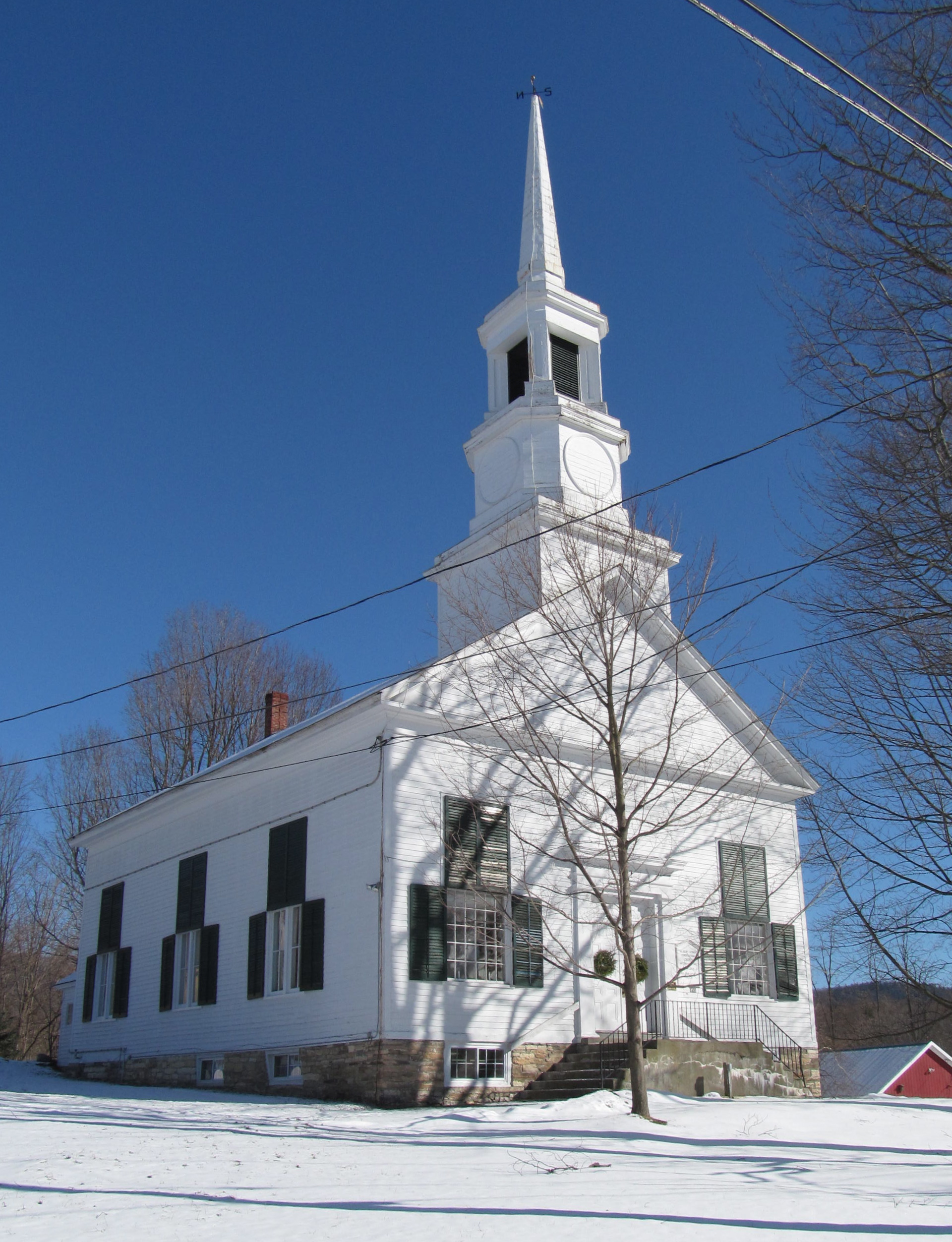
- Salisbury Congregational Church

- Location in Addison County and the state of Vermont
- Coordinates: 43°55′11″N 73°07′55″W
- Country: United States
- State: Vermont
- County: Addison
- Chartered: 1761
- Communities: Salisbury; West Salisbury; Salisbury Station; Lake Dunmore

Area
  - Total: 30.0 sq mi (77.7 km^{2})
  - Land: 28.9 sq mi (74.8 km^{2})
  - Water: 1.2 sq mi (3.0 km^{2})
- Elevation: 440 ft (130 m)

Population (2020)
  - Total: 1,221
  - Density: 42/sq mi (16.3/km^{2})
- Time zone: UTC−5 (Eastern (EST))
  - Summer (DST): UTC−4 (EDT)
- ZIP code: 05769
- Area code: 802
- FIPS code: 50-62575
- GNIS feature ID: 1462200
- Website: townofsalisbury.org

Salisbury is a town in Addison County, Vermont, United States. The population was 1,221 at the 2020 census.

== History ==
Salisbury was chartered on November 3, 1761, as one of the New Hampshire Grants issued by Benning Wentworth. The town may have been named after Salisbury, Connecticut (which was named after Salisbury, Wiltshire), or for James Cecil, 6th Earl of Salisbury.

== Geography ==
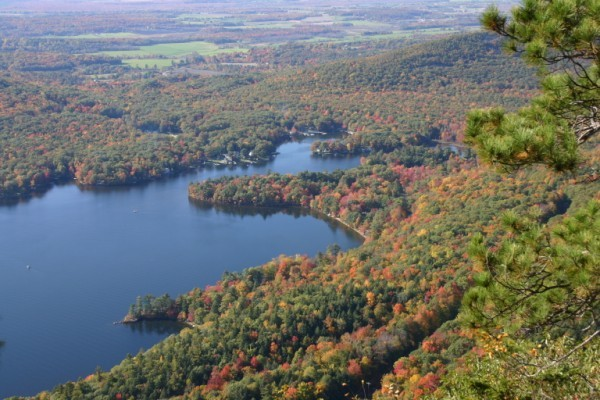
Northern half of Lake Dunmore in Salisbury

Salisbury is located in southern Addison County along the western edge of the Green Mountains and the eastern edge of the Champlain Valley. U.S. Route 7 passes through the town leading north to Middlebury and south to Brandon and Rutland. The northern half of Lake Dunmore is in the eastern part of the town, and is the site of Branbury State Park.

According to the United States Census Bureau, Salisbury has a total area of 30.0 square miles (77.7 km^{2}) of which 28.9 square miles (74.8 km^{2}) is land and 1.2 square miles (3.0 km^{2}), or 3.81%, is water.

== Demographics ==
Historical population
Census	Pop.	Note	%±
1790	446		—
1800	644		44.4%
1810	709		10.1%
1820	721		1.7%
1830	907		25.8%
1840	942		3.9%
1850	1,027		9.0%
1860	853		−16.9%
1870	902		5.7%
1880	775		−14.1%
1890	740		−4.5%
1900	692		−6.5%
1910	693		0.1%
1920	635		−8.4%
1930	632		−0.5%
1940	581		−8.1%
1950	573		−1.4%
1960	575		0.3%
1970	649		12.9%
1980	881		35.7%
1990	1,024		16.2%
2000	1,090		6.4%
2010	1,136		4.2%
2020	1,221		7.5%
U.S. Decennial Census

As of the census of 2000, there were 1,090 people, 423 households, and 302 families residing in the town. The population density was 37.4 people per square mile (14.4/km^{2}). There were 628 housing units at an average density of 21.5 per square mile (8.3/km^{2}). The racial makeup of the town was 98.17% White, 0.09% Native American, 0.28% Asian, 0.18% from other races, and 1.28% from two or more races. Hispanic or Latino of any race were 0.28% of the population.

There were 423 households, out of which 34.3% had children under the age of 18 living with them, 58.9% were married couples living together, 8.3% had a female householder with no husband present, and 28.4% were non-families. 22.9% of all households were made up of individuals, and 8.0% had someone living alone who was 65 years of age or older. The average household size was 2.54 and the average family size was 2.96.

In the town, the age distribution of the population shows 25.6% under the age of 18, 6.1% from 18 to 24, 28.8% from 25 to 44, 27.2% from 45 to 64, and 12.4% who were 65 years of age or older. The median age was 39 years. For every 100 females, there were 100.4 males. For every 100 females age 18 and over, there were 97.8 males.

The median income for a household in the town was $39,500, and the median income for a family was $45,455. Males had a median income of $27,107 versus $21,827 for females. The per capita income for the town was $19,306. About 5.1% of families and 7.7% of the population were below the poverty line, including 8.6% of those under age 18 and 2.5% of those age 65 or over.

== Parks and recreation ==
Branbury State Park, a 69-acre (28 ha) park on the shore of Lake Dunmore, is located in Salisbury. The park has 1,000 feet (300 m) of natural sandy beach, hiking trails, waterfalls, caves and camping areas. The park originally operated as a farm and then a summer boys' camp before being named a state park in 1945.

== Notable people ==
- Ebenezer N. Briggs, speaker of the Vermont House of Representatives and president pro tempore of the Vermont Senate
- Thomas Davenport, inventor
- Henry Olin, congressman from Vermont and sixth Lieutenant Governor of Vermont
- John Prout, Justice of the Vermont Supreme Court
- Ann Story, local Revolutionary War heroine and early town settler
- Wilbur F. Storey, 19th Century editor and publisher, owned Detroit Free Press and Chicago Times
- John E. Weeks, governor of Vermont, born in Salisbury

== Climate ==
This climatic region is typified by large seasonal temperature differences, with warm to hot (and often humid) summers and cold (sometimes severely cold) winters. According to the Köppen Climate Classification system, Salisbury has a humid continental climate, abbreviated "Dfb" on climate maps.

Climate data for SALISBURY 2 N (1966-2015)
Month	Jan	Feb	Mar	Apr	May	Jun	Jul	Aug	Sep	Oct	Nov	Dec	Year
Record high °F (°C)	68.0 (20.0)	65.0 (18.3)	88.0 (31.1)	92.0 (33.3)	93.0 (33.9)	96.0 (35.6)	100.0 (37.8)	98.0 (36.7)	98.0 (36.7)	82.0 (27.8)	74.0 (23.3)	67.0 (19.4)	100.0 (37.8)
Mean daily maximum °F (°C)	30.7 (−0.7)	34.7 (1.5)	44.4 (6.9)	58.8 (14.9)	71.6 (22.0)	79.8 (26.6)	83.9 (28.8)	82.3 (27.9)	74.6 (23.7)	60.7 (15.9)	47.3 (8.5)	36.1 (2.3)	58.7 (14.8)
Daily mean °F (°C)	19.8 (−6.8)	22.4 (−5.3)	31.6 (−0.2)	44.4 (6.9)	56.5 (13.6)	65.1 (18.4)	69.8 (21.0)	68.2 (20.1)	60.9 (16.1)	48.5 (9.2)	37.0 (2.8)	26.3 (−3.2)	45.9 (7.7)
Mean daily minimum °F (°C)	8.8 (−12.9)	10.1 (−12.2)	18.8 (−7.3)	29.9 (−1.2)	41.4 (5.2)	50.5 (10.3)	55.8 (13.2)	54.0 (12.2)	47.2 (8.4)	36.3 (2.4)	26.8 (−2.9)	16.4 (−8.7)	33.0 (0.6)
Record low °F (°C)	−37.0 (−38.3)	−32.0 (−35.6)	−20.0 (−28.9)	−5.0 (−20.6)	20.0 (−6.7)	24.0 (−4.4)	31.0 (−0.6)	35.0 (1.7)	22.0 (−5.6)	13.0 (−10.6)	-0.0 (−17.8)	−17.0 (−27.2)	−37.0 (−38.3)
Average precipitation inches (mm)	2.41 (61)	2.02 (51)	2.36 (60)	3.30 (84)	3.98 (101)	4.34 (110)	4.75 (121)	4.04 (103)	3.73 (95)	4.21 (107)	2.91 (74)	3.17 (81)	41.22 (1,047)
Average snowfall inches (cm)	18.5 (47)	13.8 (35)	14.1 (36)	3.2 (8.1)	0.0 (0.0)	0.0 (0.0)	0.0 (0.0)	0.0 (0.0)	0.0 (0.0)	0.5 (1.3)	4.9 (12)	17.7 (45)	72.7 (185)
Average precipitation days (≥ 0.01 in)	11.0	9.0	9.7	11.5	13.3	13.3	12.8	10.6	10.4	11.6	10.4	12.7	136.3
Average snowy days (≥ 0.1 in)	8.0	6.2	4.8	1.2	0.0	0.0	0.0	0.0	0.0	0.3	1.8	7.2	29.5
Source: ClimateAtlas
