= Middlebury (CDP), Vermont =

Census-designated place in Vermont, United States

Middlebury, Vermont
- Census-designated place
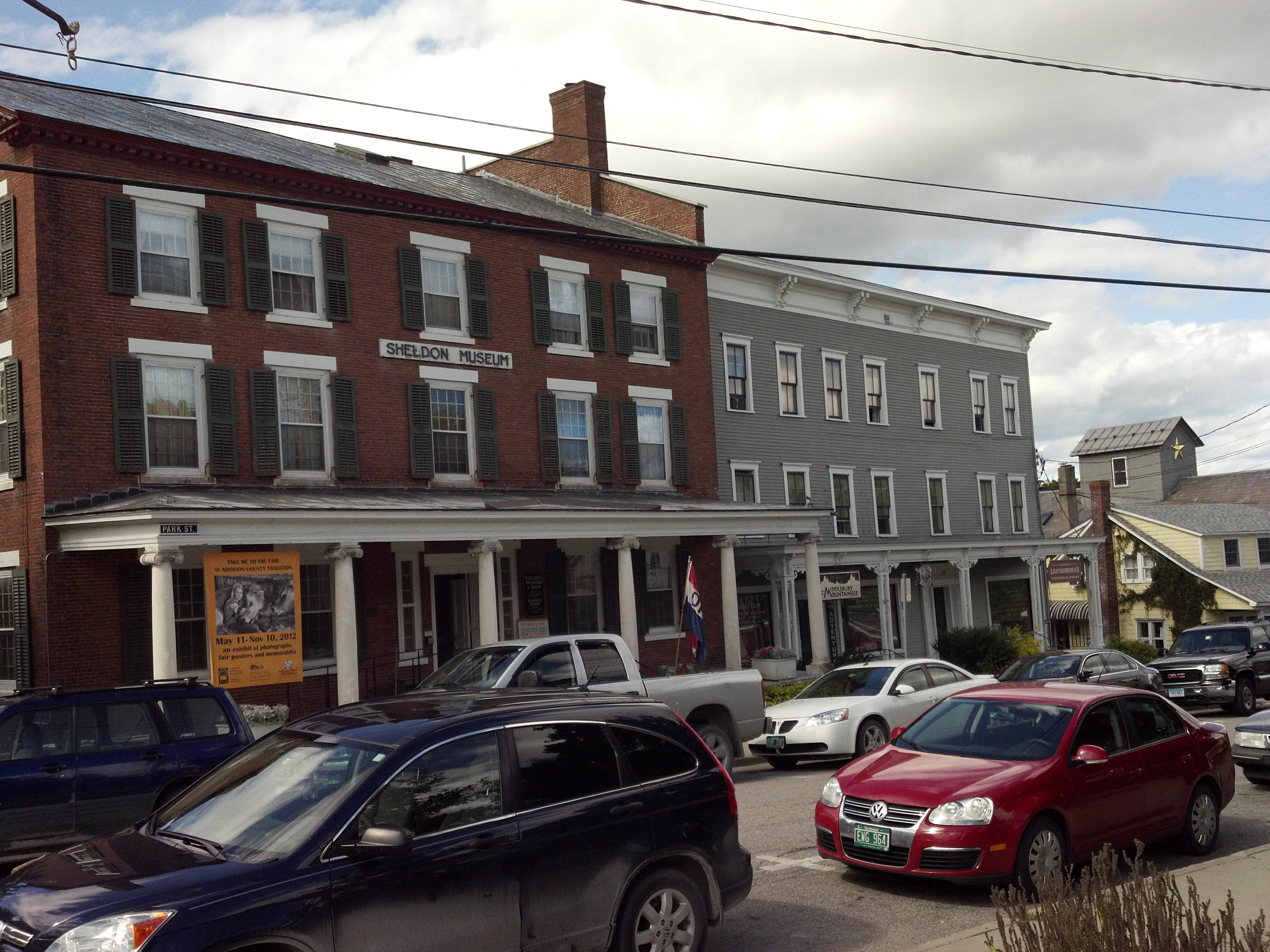
- Middlebury Village Historic District

- Location in Addison County and the state of Vermont
- Coordinates: 44°00′29″N 73°08′23″W
- Country: United States
- State: Vermont
- County: Addison
- Town: Middlebury

Area
  - Total: 14.1 sq mi (36.5 km^{2})
  - Land: 13.9 sq mi (36.0 km^{2})
  - Water: 0.19 sq mi (0.5 km^{2})
- Elevation: 364 ft (111 m)

Population (2020)
  - Total: 7,304
  - Density: 526/sq mi (202.9/km^{2})
- Time zone: UTC-5 (Eastern (EST))
  - Summer (DST): UTC-4 (EDT)
- ZIP code: 05753
- Area code: 802
- FIPS code: 50-44275
- GNIS feature ID: 2378130

Middlebury is the main settlement in the town of Middlebury in Addison County, Vermont, United States, and a census-designated place (CDP). The population was 7,304 at the 2020 census, out of a total population of 9,152 in the town of Middlebury. Most of the village is listed on the National Register of Historic Places as the Middlebury Village Historic District.

== Geography ==
The Middlebury CDP is located in the northwest part of the town of Middlebury, centered on a falls on Otter Creek. According to the United States Census Bureau, the CDP has a total area of 14.1 square miles (36.5 km^{2}), of which 13.9 square miles (36.0 km^{2}) is land and 0.19 square miles (0.5 km^{2}), or 1.31%, is water.

== History ==
The village of Middlebury grew as one of Addison County's early industrial centers, due to the presence of a significant waterfall on Otter Creek. The area around the falls developed as the center of industry, with mills lining the river in the Frog Hollow area (Mill Street), where the 1840 Stone Mill is one of the only survivors of that past. It also became a major stop on north–south stagecoach routes, running between Burlington and Rutland. The town green is located directly on this historic route (now United States Route 7), and features important examples of civic and religious architecture. The local Congregational Church, built 1806–09, is the oldest in the county, and is a fine example of Federal period architecture. Also impressive are the Middlebury Inn, built 1826 and restyled later in the 19th and early 20th centuries. Middlebury College was founded in 1800, and its campus is located just southwest of the village center. Another important educational milestone was the 1814 founding by Emma Willard of a private school for women, located in her house on South Main Street. Much of the village was listed on the National Register of Historic Places in 1976, with a significant enlargement in 1980.

== Demographics ==
As of the census of 2000, there were 6,252 people, 1,876 households, and 984 families residing in the CDP. The population density was 173.3 people/km^{2} (449 people/mi^{2}). There were 1,984 housing units at an average density of 55.0 units/km^{2} (142 units/mi^{2}). The racial makeup of the CDP was 93.19% White, 1.39% Black or African American, 0.32% Native American, 2.27% Asian, 0.02% Pacific Islander, 0.80% from other races, and 2.02% from two or more races. Hispanic or Latino of any race were 2.48% of the population.

There were 1,876 households, out of which 25.4% had children under the age of 18 living with them, 40.0% were married couples living together, 10.0% had a female householder with no husband present, and 47.5% were non-families. 39.7% of all households were made up of individuals, and 16.8% had someone living alone who was 65 years of age or older. The average household size was 2.15 and the average family size was 2.90.

In the CDP, the population was spread out, with 14.9% under the age of 18, 38.8% from 18 to 24, 16.5% from 25 to 44, 16.4% from 45 to 64, and 13.4% who were 65 years of age or older. The median age was 23 years. For every 100 females, there were 86.8 males. For every 100 females age 18 and over, there were 85.1 males.

The median income for a household in the CDP was $34,599, and the median income for a family was $47,917. Males had a median income of $33,681 versus $25,804 for females. The per capita income for the CDP was $15,990. About 4.0% of families and 9.5% of the population were below the poverty line, including 6.9% of those under age 18 and 5.8% of those age 65 or over.

== Education ==
Middlebury College is located just southwest of the village center.

== See also ==
- National Register of Historic Places listings in Addison County, Vermont
