= Addison County, Vermont =

County in Vermont, United States

- County
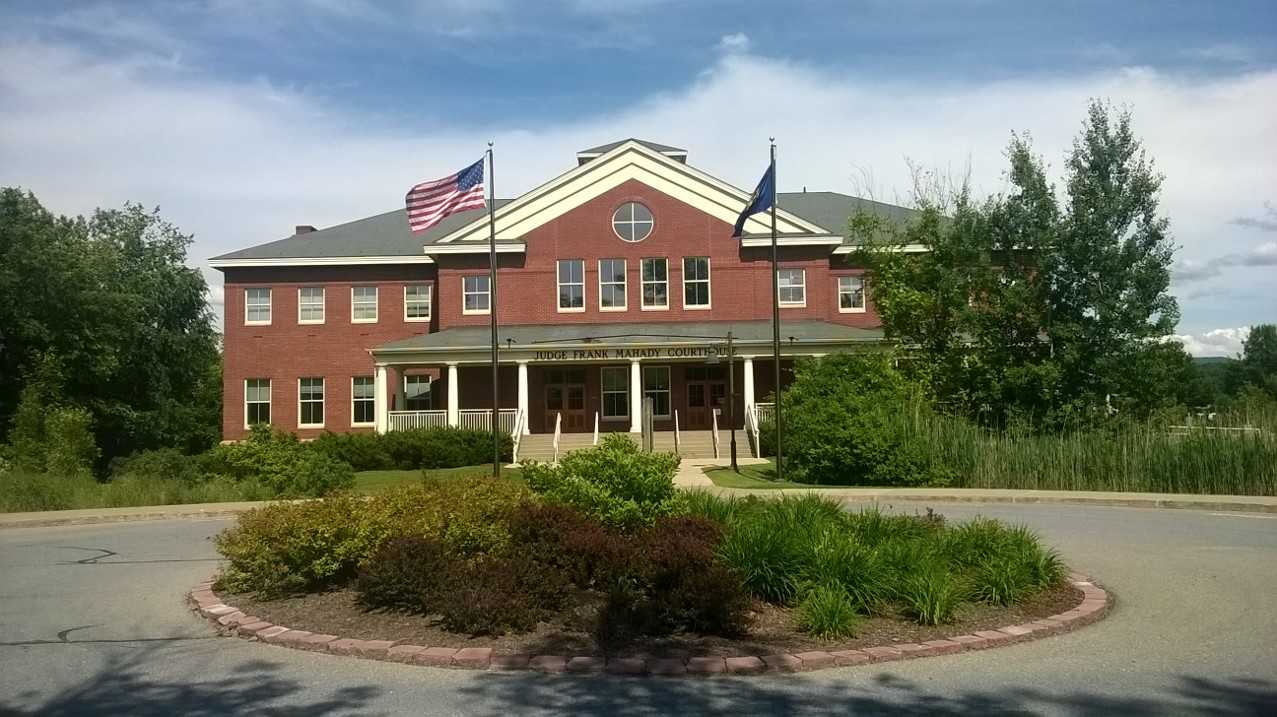
- Addison County courthouse in Middlebury

- Location within the U.S. state of Vermont
- Coordinates: 44°01′58″N 73°10′05″W
- Country: United States
- State: Vermont
- Founded: 1785
- Named for: Joseph Addison
- Shire Town: Middlebury
- Largest town: Middlebury

Area
  - Total: 808 sq mi (2,090 km^{2})
  - Land: 766 sq mi (1,980 km^{2})
  - Water: 41 sq mi (110 km^{2}) 5.1%

Population (2020)
  - Total: 37,363
  - Estimate (2025): 38,048 ▲
  - Density: 48.8/sq mi (18.8/km^{2})
- Time zone: UTC−5 (Eastern)
  - Summer (DST): UTC−4 (EDT)
- Congressional district: At-large
- Website: www.addisoncounty.com

Addison County is a county located in the U.S. state of Vermont. As of the 2020 census, the population was 37,363. Its shire town (county seat) is the town of Middlebury.

== History ==
Iroquois settled in the county before Europeans arrived in 1609. French settlers in Crown Point, New York, extended their settlements across Lake Champlain. A few individuals or families came up the lake from Canada and established themselves at Chimney Point in 1730. In 1731, Fort Frederic was erected at Cross Point. In 1759, General Amherst occupied Cross Point and British settlers came in.

Addison County was established by act of the Legislature October 18, 1785, during the period of Vermont Republic. In 1791, Vermont joined the federal union after the original thirteen colonies. The major product of the county was wheat. In the 1820s, farmers began to raise sheep. The Champlain Canal was opened in 1823, making it possible for ships to navigate from the Hudson River. In 1840, the county produced more wool than any other county in the United States.

When Vermont was admitted into the Union in 1791, there were 9,267 people living in Addison County. By 1830, the population had grown to 26,503 people.

In 2008, the federal government declared the county a disaster area after severe storms and flooding June 14–17.

== Geography ==
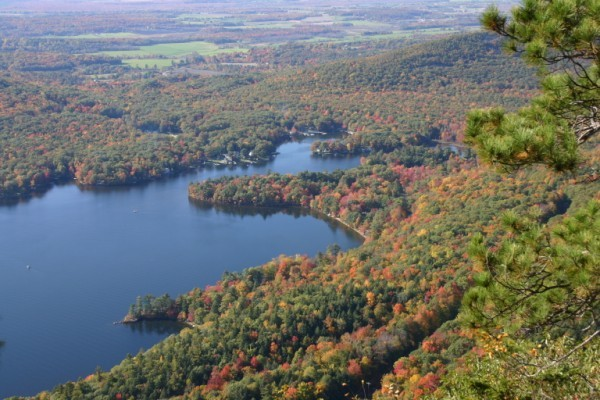
Lake Dunmore is located in Salisbury and Leicester, entirely within Addison County.

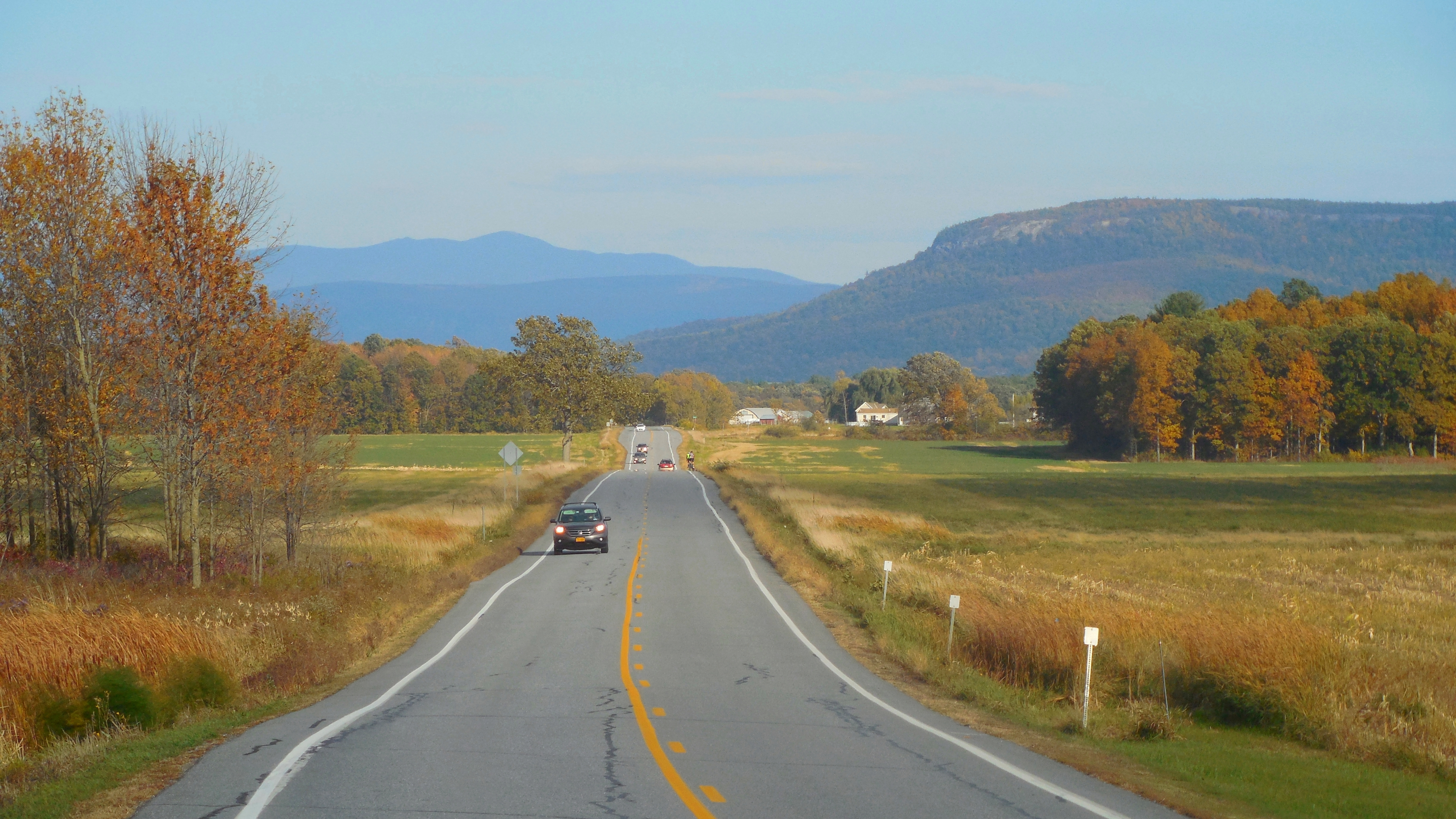
Eastern view from Vermont Route 17 in Addison of Snake Mountain (right) and Mount Abraham (center).

According to the U.S. Census Bureau, the county has a total area of 808 square miles (2,090 km^{2}), of which 766 square miles (1,980 km^{2}) is land and 41 square miles (110 km^{2}) (5.1%) is water. It is the third-largest county in Vermont by total area.

Addison County is located in the western half of the state of Vermont and nearly in the center north and south; between 43° 50′ and 44° 10′ north latitude. The primary stream of the county is Otter Creek, which runs through the county from the south to the north.

=== Adjacent counties ===
- Chittenden County - north
- Washington County - northeast
- Orange County - east
- Windsor County - southeast
- Rutland County - south
- Washington County, New York - southwest
- Essex County, New York - west

=== National protected area ===
- Green Mountain National Forest (part)

== Demographics ==
Historical population
Census	Pop.	Note	%±
1790	6,420		—
1800	13,417		109.0%
1810	19,998		49.0%
1820	20,469		2.4%
1830	24,940		21.8%
1840	23,583		−5.4%
1850	26,549		12.6%
1860	24,010		−9.6%
1870	23,484		−2.2%
1880	24,173		2.9%
1890	22,277		−7.8%
1900	21,912		−1.6%
1910	20,010		−8.7%
1920	18,666		−6.7%
1930	17,952		−3.8%
1940	17,944		0.0%
1950	19,442		8.3%
1960	20,076		3.3%
1970	24,266		20.9%
1980	29,406		21.2%
1990	32,953		12.1%
2000	35,974		9.2%
2010	36,821		2.4%
2020	37,363		1.5%
2025 (est.)	38,048	▲	1.8%
U.S. Decennial Census; 1790–1960 1900–1990; 1990–2000 2010–2018

=== 2020 census ===
As of the 2020 census, the county had a population of 37,363. Of the residents, 17.0% were under the age of 18 and 21.7% were 65 years of age or older; the median age was 44.1 years. For every 100 females there were 97.4 males, and for every 100 females age 18 and over there were 95.6 males.

The racial makeup of the county was 90.4% White, 1.0% Black or African American, 0.3% American Indian and Alaska Native, 1.6% Asian, 1.2% from some other race, and 5.5% from two or more races. Hispanic or Latino residents of any race comprised 3.1% of the population.

There were 14,906 households in the county, of which 24.9% had children under the age of 18 living with them and 22.8% had a female householder with no spouse or partner present. About 27.7% of all households were made up of individuals and 13.0% had someone living alone who was 65 years of age or older.

There were 17,385 housing units, of which 14.3% were vacant. Among occupied housing units, 75.1% were owner-occupied and 24.9% were renter-occupied. The homeowner vacancy rate was 1.1% and the rental vacancy rate was 4.8%.

Addison County, Vermont – Racial and ethnic composition Note: the US Census treats Hispanic/Latino as an ethnic category. This table excludes Latinos from the racial categories and assigns them to a separate category. Hispanics/Latinos may be of any race.
Race / Ethnicity (NH = Non-Hispanic)	Pop 2000	Pop 2010	Pop 2020	% 2000	% 2010	% 2020
White alone (NH)	34,612	34,660	33,440	96.21%	94.13%	89.50%
Black or African American alone (NH)	184	269	342	0.51%	0.73%	0.91%
Native American or Alaska Native alone (NH)	90	75	80	0.25%	0.20%	0.21%
Asian alone (NH)	254	524	594	0.70%	1.42%	1.58%
Pacific Islander alone (NH)	8	5	10	0.02%	0.01%	0.02%
Other race alone (NH)	17	35	110	0.04%	0.09%	0.29%
Mixed race or Multiracial (NH)	412	568	1,634	1.14%	1.54%	4.37%
Hispanic or Latino (any race)	397	685	1,153	1.10%	1.86%	3.08%
Total	35,974	36,821	37,363	100.00%	100.00%	100.00%

=== 2010 census ===
As of the 2010 United States census, there were 36,821 people, 14,084 households, and 9,340 families living in the county. The population density was 48.0 inhabitants per square mile (18.5/km^{2}). There were 16,760 housing units at an average density of 21.9 per square mile (8.5/km^{2}). The racial makeup of the county was 95.3% white, 1.4% Asian, 0.8% black or African American, 0.2% American Indian, 0.5% from other races, and 1.7% from two or more races. Those of Hispanic or Latino origin made up 1.9% of the population. In terms of ancestry, 18.1% were English, 17.2% were Irish, 12.0% were German, 7.5% were American, 7.2% were French Canadian, 5.9% were Italian, and 5.3% were Scottish.

Of the 14,084 households, 29.5% had children under the age of 18 living with them, 53.3% were married couples living together, 8.6% had a female householder with no husband present, 33.7% were non-families, and 25.5% of all households were made up of individuals. The average household size was 2.41 and the average family size was 2.88. The median age was 41.3 years.

The median income for a household in the county was $55,800 and the median income for a family was $67,721. Males had a median income of $43,643 versus $34,486 for females. The per capita income for the county was $26,599. About 5.7% of families and 11.3% of the population were below the poverty line, including 11.4% of those under age 18 and 5.8% of those age 65 or over.

=== 2000 census ===
According to the 2000 census, there were 35,974 people, 13,068 households and 9,108 families living in the county. The population density was 47 people per square mile (18 people/km^{2}). There were 15,312 housing units at an average density of 20 units per square mile (7.7 units/km^{2}). The racial makeup of the county was 96.86% White, 0.54% Black or African American, 0.26% Native American, 0.73% Asian, 0.03% Pacific Islander, 0.29% from other races, and 1.29% from two or more races. 1.10% of the population were Hispanic or Latino of any race. 15.5% were of English, 12.7% American, 12.0% French, 10.8% French Canadian, 10.8% Irish and 6.7% German ancestry. 96.0% spoke English, 1.8% French and 1.2% Spanish as their first language.

There were 13,068 households, of which 34.40% had children under the age of 18 living with them, 57.40% were married couples living together, 8.30% had a female householder with no husband present, and 30.30% were non-families. 23.40% of all households were made up of individuals, and 8.90% had someone living alone who was 65 years of age or older. The average household size was 2.55 and the average family size was 3.02.

Age distribution was 24.90% under the age of 18, 12.50% from 18 to 24, 26.90% from 25 to 44, 24.30% from 45 to 64, and 11.30% who were 65 years of age or older. The median age was 36 years. For every 100 females there were 97.70 males. For every 100 females age 18 and over, there were 95.40 males.

The median household income was $43,142, and the median family income was $49,351. Males had a median income of $31,836 versus $24,416 for females. The per capita income for the county was $19,539. About 5.10% of families and 8.60% of the population were below the poverty line, including 9.10% of those under age 18 and 8.00% of those age 65 or over.

For historical populations since 1900, see Historical U.S. Census totals for Addison County, Vermont

== Politics ==
In 1828, the county voted for National Republican Party candidate John Quincy Adams.

In 1832, the county voted for Anti-Masonic Party candidate William Wirt.

From William Henry Harrison in 1836 to Winfield Scott in 1852, the state would vote the Whig Party candidates.

From John C. Frémont in 1856 to Richard Nixon in 1960, the Republican Party would have a 104-year winning streak in the county.

In 1964, the county was won by Democratic Party incumbent President Lyndon B. Johnson, who became not only the first Democratic presidential candidate to win the county, but to win the state of Vermont entirely.

Following the Democrats victory in 1964, the county went back to voting for Republican candidates for another 16 year winning streak starting with Richard Nixon in 1968 and ending with Ronald Reagan in 1984, who became the last Republican presidential candidate to win the county.

In 1988, the county was won by Michael Dukakis and has been won by Democratic candidates ever since.

United States presidential election results for Addison County, Vermont
Year	Republican / Whig		Democratic		Third party(ies)	
Year	No.	%	No.	%	No.	%
1848	2,319	65.20%	273	7.68%	965	27.13%
1852	1,847	65.43%	341	12.08%	635	22.49%
1856	3,084	89.21%	306	8.85%	67	1.94%
1860	2,411	86.91%	302	10.89%	61	2.20%
1864	3,548	91.21%	342	8.79%	0	0.00%
1868	3,679	90.08%	405	9.92%	0	0.00%
1872	3,586	87.00%	517	12.54%	19	0.46%
1876	3,787	81.92%	835	18.06%	1	0.02%
1880	3,842	85.72%	585	13.05%	55	1.23%
1884	4,878	85.85%	600	10.56%	204	3.59%
1888	4,036	82.77%	618	12.67%	222	4.55%
1892	3,146	80.73%	621	15.94%	130	3.34%
1896	4,314	89.17%	404	8.35%	120	2.48%
1900	3,286	86.41%	467	12.28%	50	1.31%
1904	3,146	87.20%	366	10.14%	96	2.66%
1908	2,986	84.42%	444	12.55%	107	3.03%
1912	1,835	45.34%	621	15.34%	1,591	39.31%
1916	2,765	74.67%	874	23.60%	64	1.73%
1920	4,515	88.93%	503	9.91%	59	1.16%
1924	4,927	87.68%	557	9.91%	135	2.40%
1928	5,247	72.09%	2,003	27.52%	28	0.38%
1932	5,295	62.83%	3,031	35.96%	102	1.21%
1936	5,161	65.90%	2,646	33.79%	24	0.31%
1940	4,500	63.22%	2,593	36.43%	25	0.35%
1944	4,097	66.25%	2,079	33.62%	8	0.13%
1948	4,148	70.68%	1,615	27.52%	106	1.81%
1952	6,057	78.18%	1,667	21.52%	24	0.31%
1956	5,990	78.22%	1,668	21.78%	0	0.00%
1960	5,520	65.03%	2,969	34.97%	0	0.00%
1964	3,500	42.38%	4,758	57.62%	0	0.00%
1968	5,006	60.84%	2,914	35.42%	308	3.74%
1972	6,467	65.99%	3,262	33.29%	71	0.72%
1976	5,726	56.52%	4,164	41.10%	241	2.38%
1980	5,216	44.85%	4,351	37.41%	2,063	17.74%
1984	7,589	58.26%	5,299	40.68%	137	1.05%
1988	6,773	49.09%	6,791	49.22%	233	1.69%
1992	5,034	29.57%	8,092	47.53%	3,900	22.91%
1996	4,798	31.05%	8,164	52.83%	2,491	16.12%
2000	6,953	39.90%	8,936	51.28%	1,538	8.83%
2004	7,077	38.09%	11,147	60.00%	355	1.91%
2008	5,667	29.46%	13,202	68.62%	369	1.92%
2012	5,203	29.05%	12,257	68.44%	450	2.51%
2016	5,297	27.83%	11,219	58.95%	2,515	13.22%
2020	6,292	28.57%	14,967	67.96%	763	3.46%
2024	6,841	30.26%	14,879	65.82%	887	3.92%

== Education ==
Middlebury College is located in Addison County.

School districts/supervisory unions include:

- Addison Central Unified School District
- Addison Northwest Unified School District
- Addison Rutland Supervisory District
- Mt. Abraham Unified School District
- Rutland Northeast Supervisory Union
- White River Valley Supervisory Union

Addison County has the following high schools:

- Vergennes Union High School in Vergennes
- Mt. Abraham Union High School in Bristol
- Middlebury Union High School in Middlebury

Addison County is also home to two institutions of higher learning, Middlebury College and the Community College of Vermont, both located in Middlebury.

== Transportation ==
=== Air ===
The Middlebury State Airport serves private aviation for Addison County. Commercial airlines are available to the north at Burlington International Airport in Chittenden County, and to the south at Rutland Southern Vermont Regional Airport in Rutland County.

=== Public transportation ===
Public bus service in Addison County is operated by Tri-Valley Transit (formerly ACTR). There is extensive bus service around Middlebury with connections to Vergennes, New Haven and Bristol, seasonal service to Middlebury Snow Bowl, as well as commuter buses to Burlington and Rutland operated in conjunction with Green Mountain Transit and the Marble Valley Regional Transit District, respectively.

Although the majority of rides are provided through the Shuttle Bus System, ACTR also operates a Dial-A-Ride System. This system enhances ACTR's ability to provide comprehensive transportation alternatives for all Addison County residents.

The Dial-A-Ride System includes programs that focus on specialized populations including elders, persons with disabilities, low-income families and individuals, as well as the visually impaired. Those eligible for Medicaid, Reach Up, are aged 60+ or with a disability may be eligible for free transportation. Nearly 40 Volunteer Drivers work with ACTR to provide these rides. Additional information about ACTR's transportation services are available at www.actr-vt.org.

Amtrak's daily Ethan Allen Express train serves two stations in Addison County: Middlebury and Ferrisburgh–Vergennes. The train makes major stops in Burlington, Rutland, Albany, and New York City. Begun in July 2022, this is the first regular passenger rail route in the county since the Rutland Railroad discontinued service in 1953.

Vermont Translines, an intercity bus carrier and interline partner with Greyhound and Amtrak, serves Addison County from Middlebury and Vergennes as well.

=== Major highways ===
- U.S. Route 7
- Vermont Route 12A
- Vermont Route 17
- Vermont Route 22A
- Vermont Route 23
- Vermont Route 30
- Vermont Route 53
- Vermont Route 73
- Vermont Route 74
- Vermont Route 100
- Vermont Route 116
- Vermont Route 125

== Communities ==
=== City ===
- Vergennes

=== Towns ===
- Addison
- Bridport
- Bristol
- Cornwall
- Ferrisburgh
- Goshen
- Granville
- Hancock
- Leicester
- Lincoln
- Middlebury (shire town)
- Monkton
- New Haven
- Orwell
- Panton
- Ripton
- Salisbury
- Shoreham
- Starksboro
- Waltham
- Weybridge
- Whiting

=== Census-designated places ===
- Bristol
- East Middlebury
- Lincoln
- Middlebury
- New Haven
- South Lincoln

=== Other unincorporated communities ===
- Bread Loaf
- Chimney Point
- Satans Kingdom

== See also ==
- Tri-Valley Transit
- Historical U.S. Census totals for Addison County, Vermont
- List of counties in Vermont
- List of municipalities in Vermont
- National Register of Historic Places listings in Addison County, Vermont
- USS Addison County (LST-31)
