= Vermont Route 125 =

State highway in Addison County, Vermont, US

Vermont Route 125
- Map of Addison County in western Vermont with VT 125 highlighted in red

Route information
- Maintained by VTrans
- Length: 35.901 mi (57.777 km)
- Existed: 1935–present
- History: Extended over VT 19 by 1949

Major junctions
- West end: VT 17 in Addison
- US 7 in Middlebury
- East end: VT 100 in Hancock

Location
- Country: United States
- State: Vermont
- Counties: Addison

Highway system
- State highways in Vermont
← VT 123	→ VT 127
← VT 18	→ VT 22A
← VT F-7	→ VT F-9

Vermont Route 125 (VT 125) is a 35.901-mile-long (57.777 km) east–west state highway in Addison County, Vermont, United States. The route begins at an intersection for VT 17 in the town of Addison near the Champlain Bridge. The route runs through the towns of Bridport, Middlebury, Ripton and the Green Mountain National Forest before reaching a junction with VT 100 in Hancock. Parts of VT 125 from Bridport to Middlebury were designated as Vermont Route F-8 by 1926, but was truncated by 1931 to a segment between West Bridport and VT 30A (current-day VT 22A). The section between VT 30A and Middlebury had been designated as Vermont Route 19. VT 19 began at VT 17 in Chimney Point, terminating at VT 30 in Middlebury. VT 125 had been designated between US 7 in Middlebury to VT 100 in Hancock by 1935, but by 1949, had absorbed the entirety of VT 19 to Chimney Point.

== Route description ==
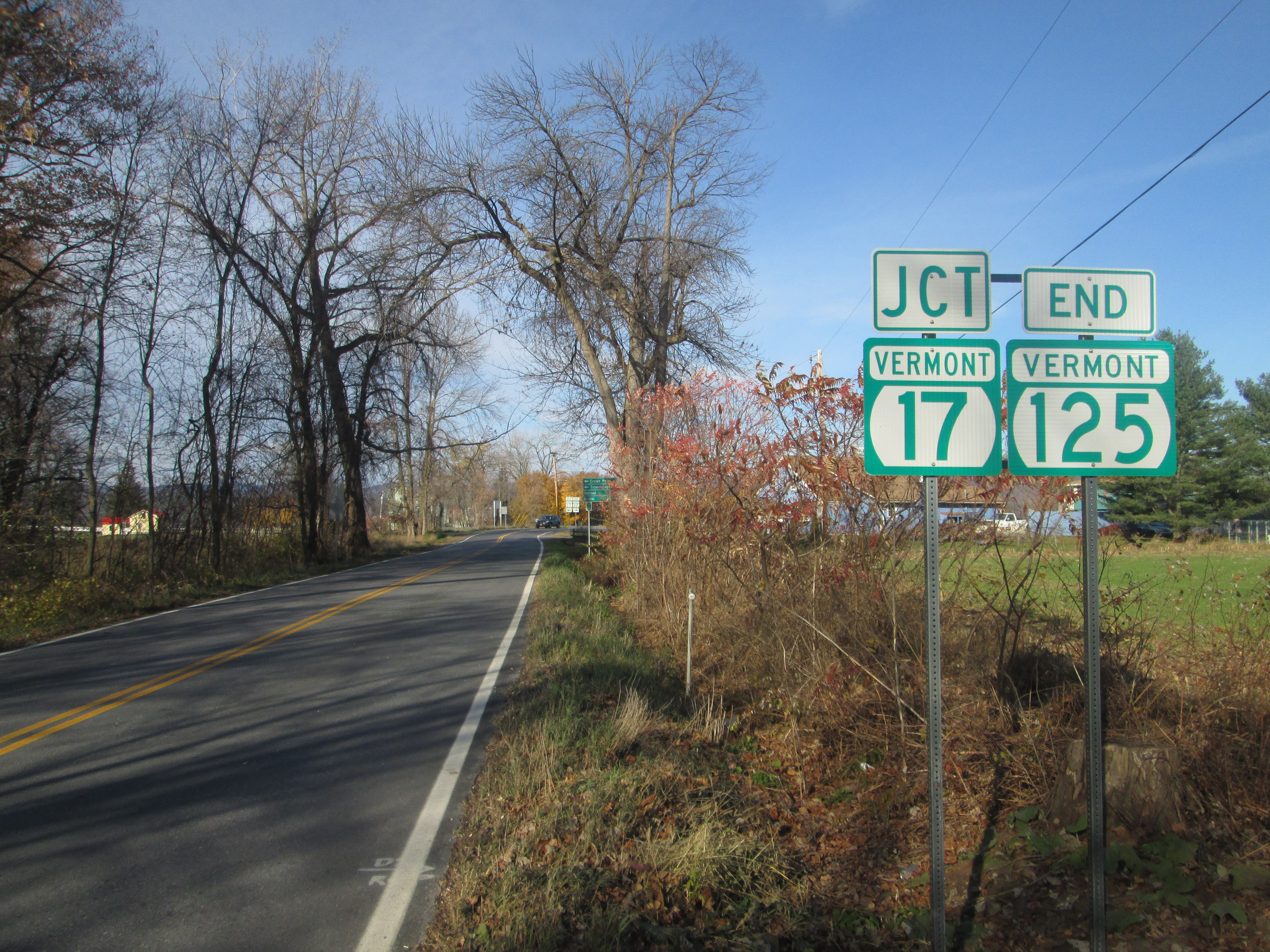
VT 125 approaching the junction with VT 17 in Chimney Point

VT 125 begins at an intersection with VT 17 in the Chimney Point section of Addison just after the latter comes off the Champlain Bridge from Crown Point. VT 125 runs southeast through the Chimney Point State Historic Site as Bridge Road, a two-lane local road. Running along the western shore of Lake Champlain, the route passes several housing developments in the town of Addison, crossing south over a local tributary of the lake. Winding southeast, VT 125 crosses through the flats of Addison County, crossing into the town of Bridport. Turning away from the lake shore, VT 125 turns east at the junction with Lake Street, soon bending southeast through the flats in Bridport. At West Market Street, the route turns eastward again, reaching the hamlet of Bridport.

In Bridport, VT 125 reaches a junction with VT 22A, where the two routes become concurrent, while VT 125's old right-of-way continues east as Market Road. VT 125 and VT 22A run south for a short stretch in Bridport, with VT 125 quickly turning to the east. Continuing through farms in the town of Bridport, the route runs up a ridge in town, making a southern bend at the ridge. Crossing the Lemon Fair River, VT 125 turns east again at West Street and begins paralleling the river. The river soon turns to the north, running east to Hamlin Road, where it turns northeast. The route soon enters dense woods, leaving them for fields again near Ridge Road. After a northeastern jog, VT 125 turns eastward at Lemon Fair Road. Now in the town of Cornwall, VT 125 runs east into the town of Middlebury.

Through Middlebury, VT 125 gains the moniker of College Street, passing the southern border of Middlebury College as a two-lane local street. At the junction with Academy Street, the route reaches the southern terminus of VT 23. After VT 23, VT 125 continues east along College Street into a junction with VT 30 (Main Street). VT 125 and VT 30 become concurrent through Middlebury, running northeast along Main Street through the center of town, crossing over nearby Otter Creek. After Otter Creek, the routes make a bend to the northeast and reaching a junction with US 7 (North Pleasant Street). At this junction, VT 30 terminates while VT 125 runs south along a short concurrency with US 7. The routes turn east at Court Square, becoming a short one-way pair before turning southeast on Court Street. US 7 and VT 125 runs southeast along Court, becoming a two-lane residential street, turning closer to the east at Creek Road, becoming a main commercial street.

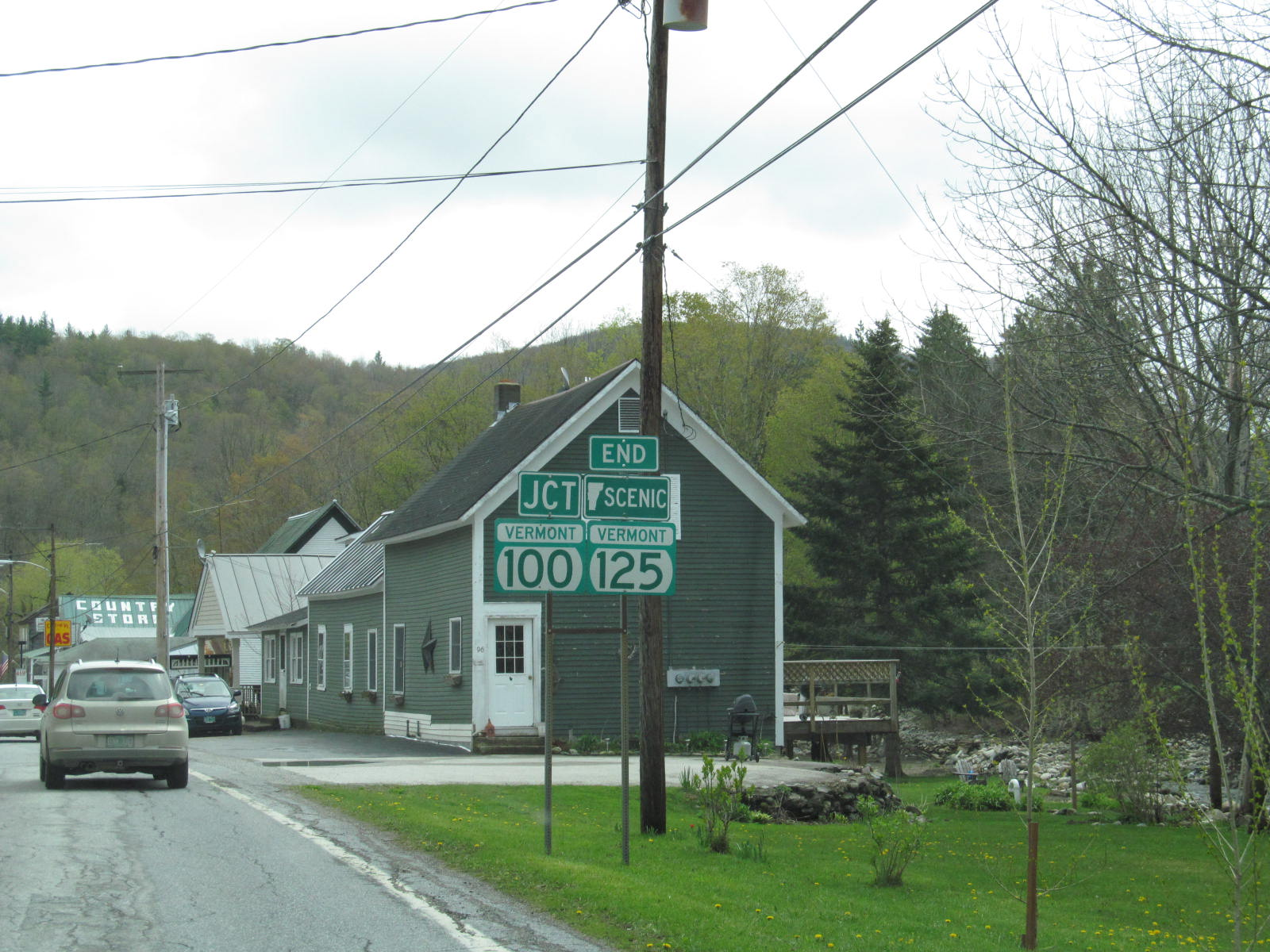
VT 125, signed as SCENIC VT 125, at the junction with VT 100 in Hancock

US 7 and VT 125 soon crosses through Middlebury as a two-lane road which soon becomes residential. This soon relents for fields and farms, until a junction with East Main Street, where VT 125 turns eastward on East Main. Reaching East Middlebury, VT 125 soon reaches a junction with VT 116 (Church Street), a short distance from where it began at US 7. VT 125 continues southeast past VT 116 as the residential two-lane street paralleling the Middlebury River. At North Branch Road, VT 125 darts across the river, running along the southern shore of the waterway through dense woods. The route soon bends southeastward along the riverside, crossing into Green Mountain National Forest. Now signed as SCENIC VT 125, VT 125 runs northeast through the forest, crossing into the town of Ripton. Winding along the riverside, VT 125 runs mostly northeast before winding east over the Middlebury River.

After Lincoln Road, VT 125 passes a small commercial and residential area of Ripton, crossing over the Middle Branch of the Middlebury River. However, VT 125 runs along the north shore of South Branch of the Middlebury River. Running south along the riverside, crossing a junction with Goshen Road, reaching through dense woods in Ripton. Running southeast through the park, VT 125 into the hamlet of Bread Loaf, crossing Steam Mill Road and turns southeast. Near College Inn Road, VT 125 runs southeast past some homes, before turning southeast into the woods along the South Branch of the Middlebury River. Passing the eastern end of the branch, the route crosses into the town of Hancock. VT 125 runs southeast through Hancock, turning east through the forest, turning northeast past Boyden Brook Road. The woods soon relent for fields and residences and turning northeast along a nearby stream. VT 116 turns southeast once more, leaving the Green Mountain National Forest, reaching a junction with VT 100 in Hancock. This junction marks the eastern terminus of VT 125.

== History ==
Vermont Route F-8
- Location: West Bridport–Middlebury
- Existed: c. 1927–c. 1935

VT 125 dates back to as early as 1926 from VT 30A to VT 30 and VT F-7 as VT F-8, a gravel route than ran from Lake Champlain at West Bridport to Middlebury. The rest of the current VT 125 was unnumbered. By 1931, a segment of VT 125 from VT 17 (former VT F-7) to VT 27 in Middlebury as VT 19. A short segment of VT 125 from US 7 to East Middlebury was made a segment of VT 116. By 1931, VT F-8 had been consolidated to a section from West Bridport to VT 30A, and the rest of current VT 125 had remained without a designation. In 1935, as part of a 700-mile (1,100 km) addition to the Vermont state highway system, VT 125 had been designated from US 7 in Middlebury to VT 100 in Hancock. By 1949, VT 125 had been extended over VT 19 to VT 17 in Chimney Point.

== Major intersections ==
The entire route is in Addison County.

Location	mi	km	Destinations	Notes
Addison	0.000	0.000	VT 17 – Addison, Bristol	Western terminus
Bridport	7.091	11.412	VT 22A north – Addison, Vergennes	Western end of concurrency with VT 22A
Bridport	7.539	12.133	VT 22A south – Shoreham, Fair Haven	Eastern end of concurrency with VT 22A
Middlebury	15.632	25.157	VT 23 north	Southern terminus of VT 23
Middlebury	15.697	25.262	VT 30 south (Main Street) – Cornwall, Castleton Corners	Northern terminus of VT 30
Middlebury	15.955	25.677	US 7 north (Court Street) – Vergennes, Burlington	Western end of concurrency with US 7
Middlebury	19.809	31.879	US 7 south (Court Street) – Brandon, Rutland	Eastern end of concurrency with US 7
Middlebury	20.376	32.792	VT 116 (Church Street) to US 7 – Bristol, Brandon	
Hancock	35.901	57.777	VT 100 – Granville, Waterbury, Rochester, Killington	Eastern terminus
1.000 mi = 1.609 km; 1.000 km = 0.621 mi: Concurrency terminus
