= John Strong Mansion Museum =

Historic house in Vermont, United States

- John Strong House
- U.S. National Register of Historic Places
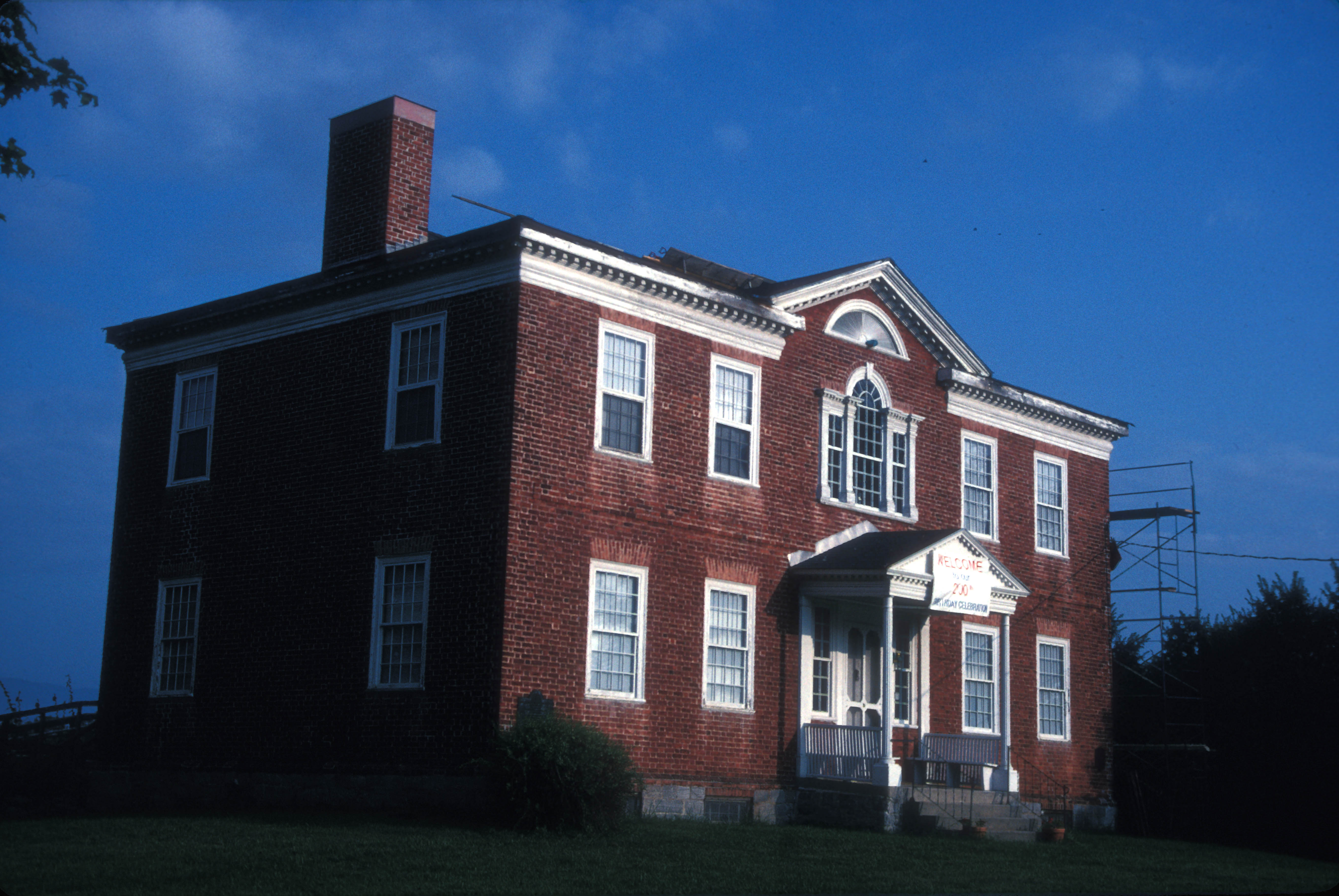

- Location within Vermont Location within the United States
- Location: 6656 VT 17W, Addison, Vermont
- Coordinates: 44°3′17″N 73°24′43″W
- Area: 1 acre (0.40 ha)
- Built: 1795
- Built by: John Strong
- Architectural style: Georgian, Federal
- NRHP reference No.: 80000326
- Added to NRHP: May 15, 1980

The John Strong Mansion Museum or John Strong House is a historic house museum on Vermont Route 17W in Addison, Vermont. It was built in 1795-96 by John Strong, a Vermont politician and veteran of the American Revolutionary War. It is one of Vermont's grandest examples of late 19th-century Federal architecture. It is now operated as a museum by the Daughters of the American Revolution, open between Memorial Day and Labor Day. It is surrounded by D.A.R. State Park. The house was listed on the National Register of Historic Places in 1980.

== Description and history ==
The John Strong Mansion stands on the west side of Vermont Route 17W, overlooking Lake Champlain in western Addison. It occupies a modest square parcel, now completely surrounded by D.A.R. State Park. It is a large two-story brick building, covered by a hipped roof with a triangular gable at the center of the east-facing front facade. The roofline has a dentillated cornice, with a half-round fan in the front gable. The main facade is five bays wide and symmetrical, with the main entrance at the center of the ground floor, and an elaborate Palladian window above it on the second floor. The entrance is flanked by wide sidelight windows, and is sheltered by an early 20th-century Colonial Revival gabled porch. The interior has well-preserved original details, including a fine central staircase and fireplace surrounds.

John Strong was a native of Connecticut who moved to the area in 1765. He built his first house not far from the site of this one, supposedly on the site of a previous French home that had been burned during the French and Indian War. He served in the Vermont militia during the Revolution, and his house was burned by the British during the war. He rebuilt that house after the war ended, and built this imposing residence in the 1790s as its replacement. His land was acquired in 1934 by the state chapter of the Daughters of the American Revolution, who donated most of it to the state for the formation of the state park.

== See also ==
- National Register of Historic Places listings in Addison County, Vermont
