= Vermont Route 17 =

State highway in western Vermont, US

Vermont Route 17
- Otter Creek Highway
- VT 17 highlighted in red

Route information
- Maintained by VTrans
- Length: 40.409 mi (65.032 km)
- Existed: c. 1930–present

Major junctions
- West end: NY 185 at the New York state line in Addison
- US 7 in New Haven; VT 116 in Bristol
- East end: VT 100 in Waitsfield

Location
- Country: United States
- State: Vermont
- Counties: Addison, Chittenden, Washington

Highway system
- State highways in Vermont
← VT 16	→ VT 18
← VT F-6	→ VT F-8

Vermont Route 17 (VT 17) is a 40.409-mile-long (65.032 km) state highway in western Vermont in the United States. The western terminus of the route is at the New York state line in Addison, where it connects to New York State Route 185 (NY 185) by way of the Lake Champlain Bridge. Its eastern terminus is at a junction with VT 100 in Waitsfield. VT 17 was initially much shorter than it is today, extending from the Champlain Bridge to Addison upon assignment. It was extended east through the Green Mountains to Waitsfield in 1965.

== Route description ==
The routing of VT 17 varies greatly on opposite sides of the Bristol town center. West of Bristol, the route passes through generally level terrain and connects multiple communities. East of Bristol, VT 17 is more mountainous and more rural in nature.

=== West of Bristol ===
VT 17 begins at the New York state line over Lake Champlain, where it connects to NY 185 at the midpoint of the Lake Champlain Bridge. The route heads northeastward from the state line, descending the eastern bridge approach and intersecting VT 125 adjacent to the Chimney Point State Historical Site at Chimney Point. It continues northward along the lakeshore of Addison County and the town of Addison for roughly 2 miles (3 km) (passing D.A.R. State Park) before turning eastward toward the village of Addison.

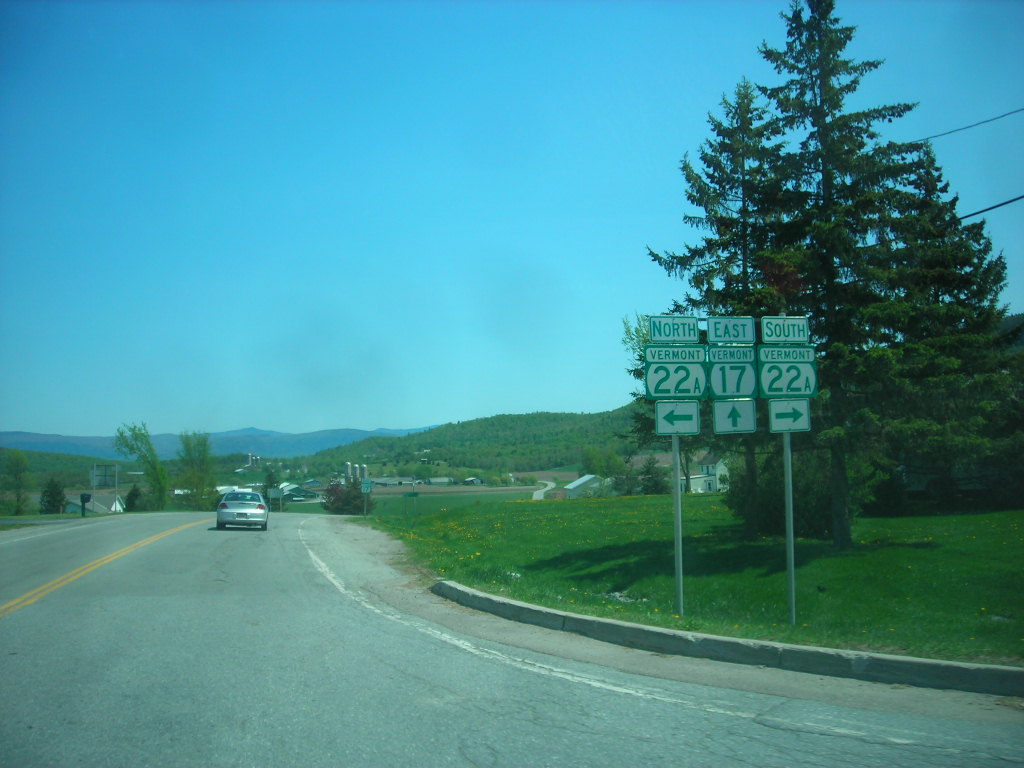
VT 17 eastbound at VT 22A in Addison

In the center of Addison, situated 6 miles (10 km) from Lake Champlain, VT 17 intersects VT 22A. VT 17 continues east from Addison, crossing over the Otter Creek and intersecting VT 23 near Weybridge prior to curving to the northeast toward Waltham. Midway between Waltham and New Haven, VT 17 briefly overlaps with U.S. Route 7 (US 7), before continuing eastward through New Haven to Bristol. As the route approaches the village of Bristol, it meets VT 116 at an intersection just west of the community. VT 116 turns east here, joining VT 17 through Bristol along Main Street.

=== East of Bristol ===
Outside Bristol, VT 17 and VT 116 are joined by the New Haven River, here marking the northern boundary of the Green Mountain National Forest. The roadway and waterway head east, following a winding route through the Green Mountains. When New Haven splits off to the southeast shortly afterward, VT 17 and VT 116 continue north along Baldwin Creek up to the point where VT 17 and VT 116 diverge. While VT 116 continues north along Beaver Brook, VT 17 remains in the vicinity of Baldwin Creek as it heads northeast through the Green Mountains.

Midway between Bristol and Waitsfield, VT 17 intersects Gore Road, a local road that leads toward Burlington 15 miles (24 km) to the north. The route crosses into Chittenden County, as well as the Camel's Hump State Park, shortly afterward. The route leaves Chittenden County and passes into Washington County 2 miles (3 km) later upon traversing the Appalachian Gap, a mountain pass located to the north of Mount Ellen. East of the gap, VT 17 continues through the eastern Green Mountains for 6 miles (10 km) to Waitsfield, where it terminates at VT 100.

== History ==
Vermont Route F-7
- Location: Chimney Point–New Haven
- Existed: c. 1927–c. 1930

The road connecting the ferry landing at Chimney Point to the town center of Addison was designated as VT F-7 ca. 1927. The ferry crossed Lake Champlain into Port Henry. VT F-7 was extended eastward to US 7 in New Haven by 1929. In 1929, the Champlain Bridge opened, connecting Chimney Point to Crown Point. By the following year, the segment of VT F-7 west of VT 30A (now VT 22A) in Addison was renumbered to VT 17, which now began on the Champlain Bridge at the New York state line. In 1933, all of VT 17 and the portion of VT F-7's former routing between Addison and New Haven were added to the state highway system. Prior to this time, maintenance of both roads was performed by the towns through which they passed. VT 17 was subsequently extended eastward to New Haven along VT F-7's former routing. As part of the 1935 state highway expansion, additional mileage was added to VT 17, which was extended 4.3 miles (6.9 km) to VT 116 in Bristol.

In 1936, a 2.7-mile (4.3 km) portion of the McCullough Turnpike in Fayston, which was chartered in 1933 but proved unprofitable, was deeded back to the state of Vermont and renamed to McCullough State Highway. The road, which extended eastward from the Chittenden–Washington county line, was paved during the period of 1936 and 1940. The rest of the McCullough Turnpike to VT 100 in Waitsfield became part of the state highway system in 1956. In 1965, the state legislature authorized the extension of VT 17 from Bristol to the Addison–Chittenden county line, connecting it to the McCullough State Highway by way of Chittenden County's section of the former McCullough Turnpike. The VT 17 designation was extended eastward through Chittenden County and along the McCullough State Highway at this time.

VT 17's connection to the state of New York was temporarily severed in October 2009 when the Champlain Bridge was closed due to safety concerns. The bridge was demolished two months later, truncating VT 17 to the eastern shoreline of Lake Champlain until its replacement, the Lake Champlain Bridge, opened to traffic on November 7, 2011.

== Major intersections ==
County	Location	mi	km	Destinations	Notes
Addison	Addison	0.000	0.000	NY 185 west (Bridge Road)	Continuation into New York
Addison	Addison	0.315	0.507	VT 125 east – Bridport, Middlebury	Western terminus of VT 125
Addison	Addison	8.377	13.481	VT 22A – Vergennes, Fair Haven	
Addison	Weybridge	11.140	17.928	VT 23 south – Middlebury	Northern terminus of VT 23
Addison	New Haven	15.735	25.323	US 7 north – Ferrisburgh, Burlington	Western end of concurrency with US 7
Addison	New Haven	15.849	25.506	US 7 south – Middlebury, Rutland	Eastern end of concurrency with US 7
Addison	Bristol	20.189	32.491	VT 116 south – Airport, East Middlebury	Western end of concurrency with VT 116
Addison	Bristol	24.503	39.434	VT 116 north – Starksboro, Hinesburg	Eastern end of concurrency with VT 116
Chittenden	No major junctions				
Washington	Waitsfield	40.409	65.032	VT 100 – Waitsfield, Waterbury, Warren, Sugarbush Ski Area, Granville	Eastern terminus
1.000 mi = 1.609 km; 1.000 km = 0.621 mi: Concurrency terminus
