= New York State Route 185 =

State highway in Essex County, New York, US

New York State Route 185
- Bridge Road
- Map of Crown Point and vicinity with NY 185 highlighted in red

Route information
- Maintained by NYSDOT
- Length: 4.11 mi (6.61 km)
- Existed: April 4, 2008–present

Major junctions
- West end: NY 9N / NY 22 in Crown Point
- East end: VT 17 at the Vermont state line in Crown Point

Location
- Country: United States
- State: New York
- Counties: Essex

Highway system
- New York Highways; Interstate; US; State; Reference; Parkways
← NY 185	→ NY 186

New York State Route 185 (NY 185) is an east–west state highway in Essex County, New York, in the United States. It serves as a connector between NY 9N and NY 22 in Crown Point and the Lake Champlain Bridge, by which the highway enters Vermont and becomes Vermont Route 17 (VT 17). NY 185, named Bridge Road, passes through Crown Point State Historic Site and runs the entire length of Crown Point, a peninsula protruding into Lake Champlain.

NY 185 was assigned on April 4, 2008, as a signed replacement for New York State Route 910L, an unsigned reference route. It is the third signed designation that Bridge Road has carried, preceded by New York State Route 347 (during the early 1930s) and NY 8 (1930s to the 1960s). NY 185 originally connected to the Champlain Bridge on its east end; however, that structure was closed and demolished in late 2009. Its replacement opened to traffic in November 2011.

== Route description ==
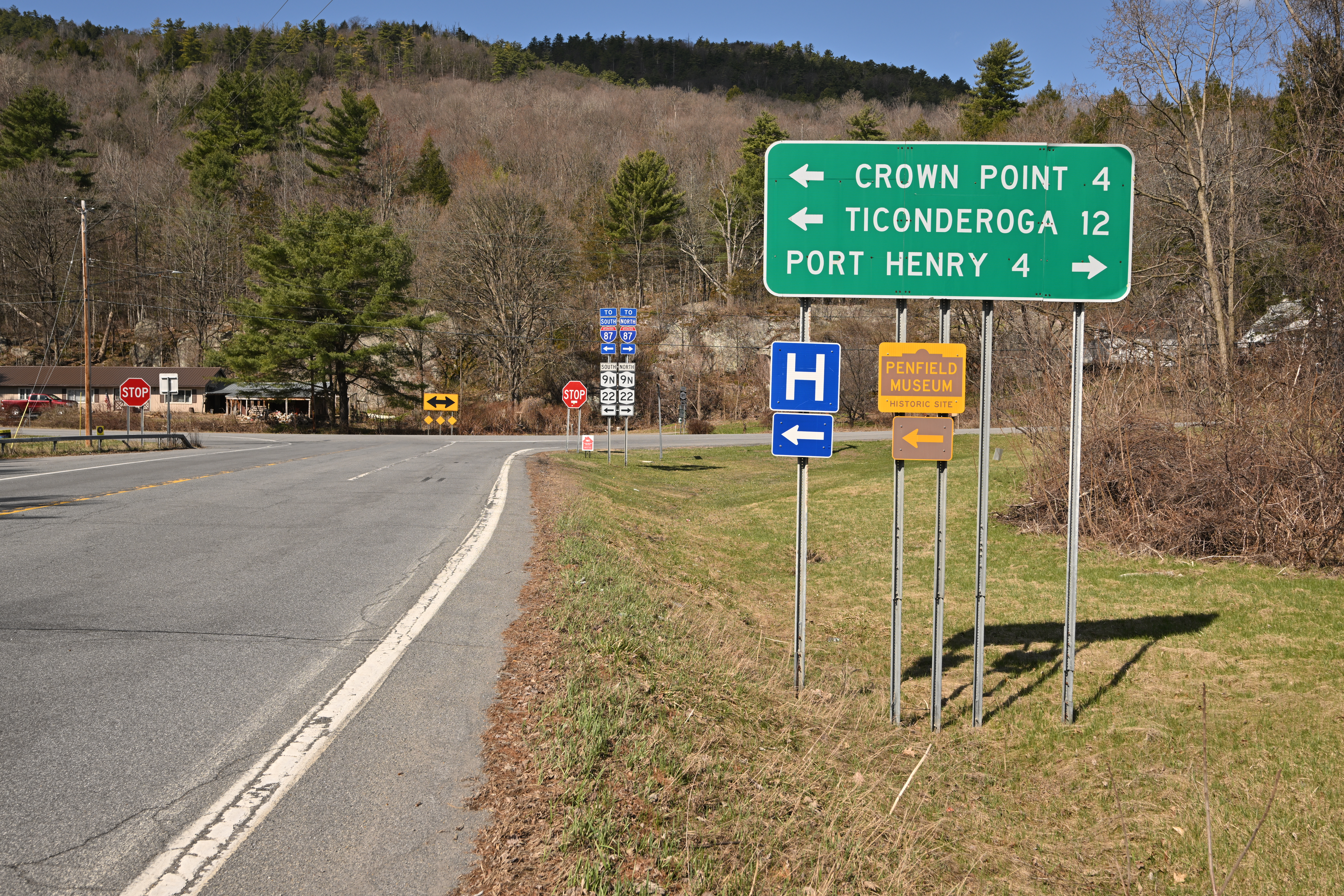
NY-185 western terminus, New York

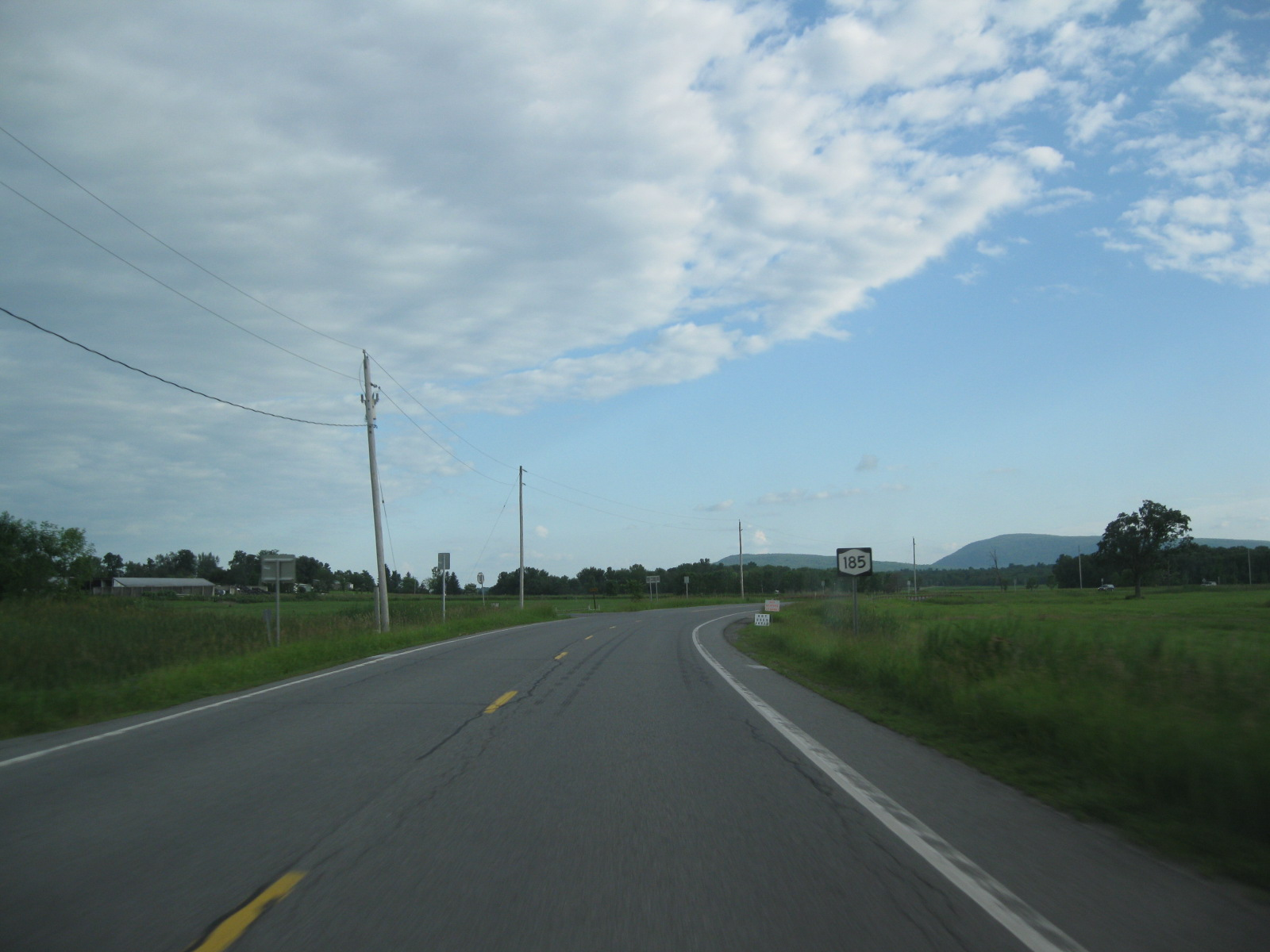
NY 185 heading through rural Crown Point.

NY 185 begins at an intersection with NY 9N and NY 22 in Crown Point. The route progresses eastward as a two-lane highway named Bridge Road. Heading away from the western terminus, there is a fork in the road: to the left is NY 185, and to the right is a road to a housing development. Most of NY 185 runs along the lowlands around Lake Champlain, making curves at intersections, and heading on relatively flat elevations. As the highway approaches the lake, it makes a curve to the north. There, it intersects with County Route 48 (Lake Road) and begins to follow the lake shore.

The highway passes to the east of the Crown Point State Historic Site and its campground before ascending up the approach to the Lake Champlain Bridge. After making a final curve to the northeast, NY 185 begins to cross Lake Champlain by way of the bridge. The route ends at the Vermont state line at the bridge's midpoint, and the roadway continues into Vermont as VT 17.

== History ==
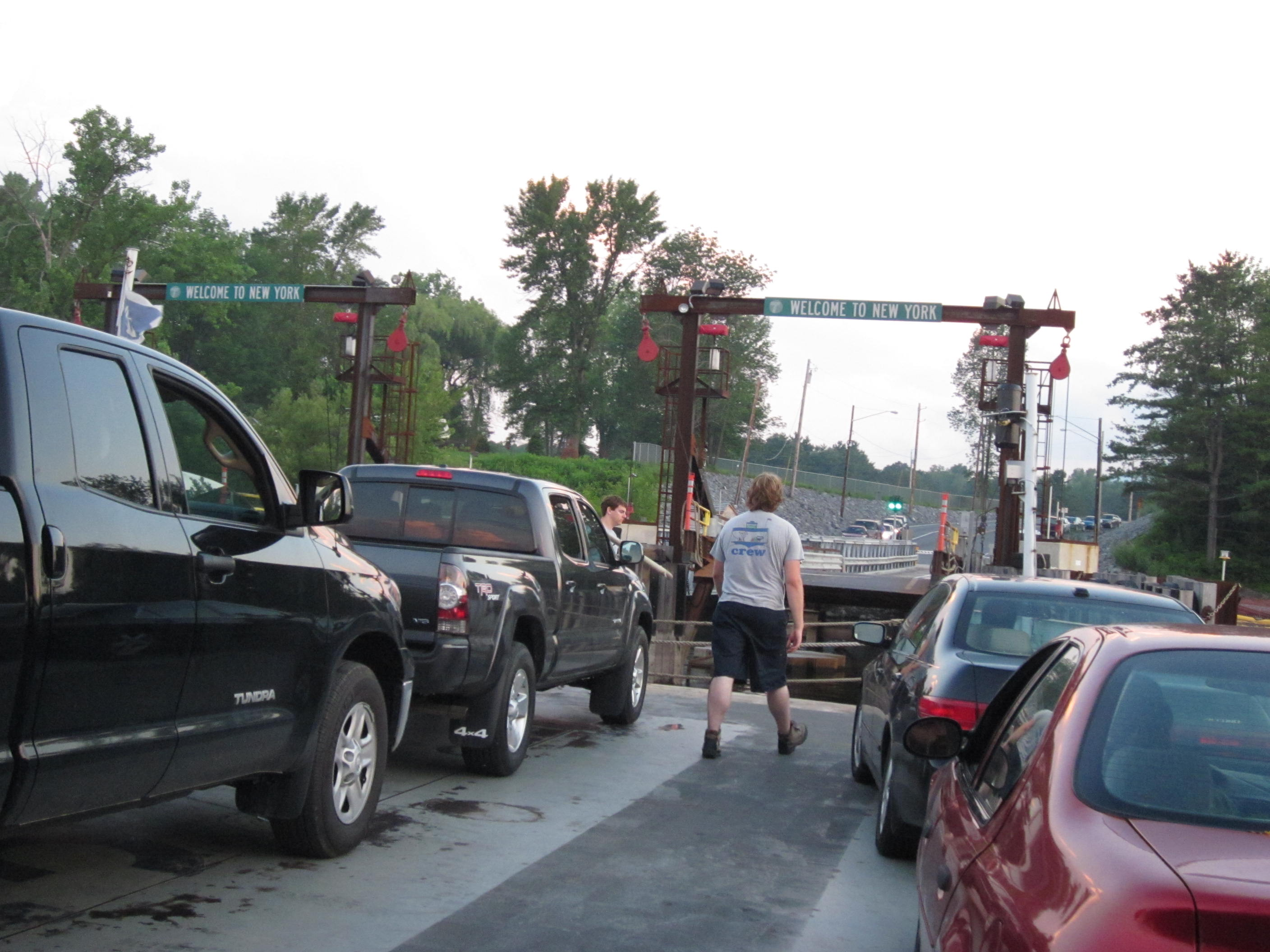
The former temporary ferry landing of NY 185 in Crown Point as a ferry approaches.

The Champlain Bridge was built in 1929, connecting Crown Point in New York to Chimney Point in Vermont. A short connector highway between the bridge—which connected to VT 17 in Vermont—and NY 22 in Crown Point, named Bridge Road, was originally designated as NY 347 as part of the 1930 renumbering of state highways in New York. NY 347 became part of an extended NY 8 c. 1934.

NY 8 was truncated south to Hague c. 1968, eliminating a lengthy overlap with NY 22 and NY 9N. Its former routing along Bridge Road became NY 903, an unsigned reference route. The NY 903 designation was later replaced with NY 910L when a new numbering system for reference routes was adopted by the New York State Department of Transportation, and NY 910L itself was redesignated and signed as NY 185 on April 4, 2008.

On October 16, 2009, the Champlain Bridge was closed to traffic due to structural concerns. The bridge was demolished on December 28, 2009, as a result of those concerns, temporarily reducing NY 185 in purpose to a spur route linking NY 9N and NY 22 to Crown Point. Its replacement, the Lake Champlain Bridge, opened to traffic on November 7, 2011.

== Major intersections ==
The entire route is in Crown Point, Essex County.

mi	km	Destinations	Notes
0.00	0.00	NY 9N / NY 22 – Crown Point, Ticonderoga, Port Henry	Western terminus
4.11	6.61	VT 17 east	Continuation into Vermont
1.000 mi = 1.609 km; 1.000 km = 0.621 mi
