= St. George (CDP), Vermont =

Census-designated place in Vermont, United States

St. George, Vermont
- Census-designated place
- Location within Vermont Location within the United States
- Coordinates: 44°22′42″N 73°07′38″W
- Country: United States
- State: Vermont
- County: Chittenden
- Town: St. George

Area
  - Total: 0.90 sq mi (2.32 km^{2})
  - Land: 0.90 sq mi (2.32 km^{2})
  - Water: 0 sq mi (0.0 km^{2})
- Elevation: 561 ft (171 m)
- Time zone: UTC-5 (Eastern (EST))
  - Summer (DST): UTC-4 (EDT)
- ZIP Code: 05495 (Williston)
- Area code: 802
- FIPS code: 50-62046
- GNIS feature ID: 2807138

St. George or Saint George is a census-designated place (CDP) in the town of St. George, Chittenden County, Vermont, United States. It was first listed as a CDP prior to the 2020 census.

== Geography ==
The CDP is in south-central Chittenden County, in the southwest corner of the town of St. George, centered on the intersection of Vermont Route 116 and Vermont Route 2A (St. George Road). It is bordered to the west by the town of Shelburne and to the south by the town of Hinesburg. VT 116 leads northwest 7 miles (11 km) to South Burlington and south-southeast 3 miles (5 km) to Hinesburg village, while VT 2A leads north 5 miles (8 km) to Williston.
