= D.A.R. State Park =

State park in Addison County, Vermont

- Location within Vermont
- Interactive map of D.A.R. State Park
- Location: Addison, Vermont, United States
- Coordinates: 44°03′12″N 73°24′44″W
- Area: 95 acres (38 ha)
- Established: 1955
- Administrator: Vermont Department of Forests, Parks, and Recreation
- Open: Memorial Day weekend - Labor Day weekend
- Website: Official website
- Vermont State Parks

D.A.R. State Park is a 95-acre state park in Addison, Vermont, on the shore of Lake Champlain. It is located on Vermont Route 17. Activities includes camping, swimming, boating, fishing, picnicking, wildlife watching, and winter sports. Camping facilities include 47 tent/trailer sites and 24 lean-tos, flush toilets, hot showers, and a dump station. Other facilities include a small picnic area located on a bluff above the lake, a stone pavilion for group gatherings, a volleyball area, swings, and shore access. There is a trailer boat launch near the park.
