= Lake Champlain Bridge (1929–2009) =

Champlain Bridge
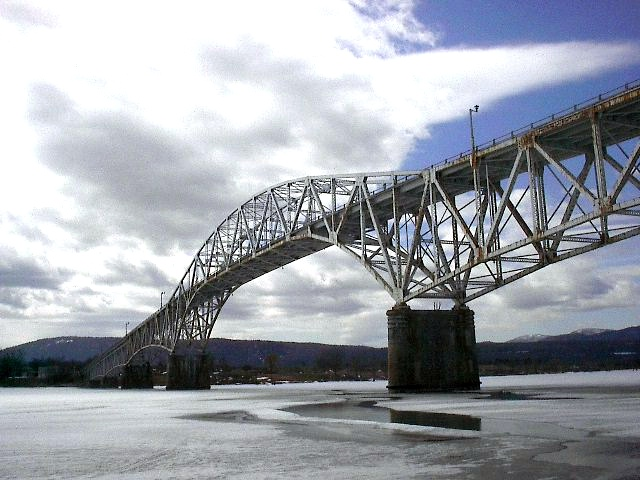
- Previous Champlain Bridge viewed from Chimney Point State Historic Site, Vermont
- Coordinates: 44°01′57″N 73°25′24″W
- Carries: Two lanes of NY 185 and VT 17
- Crosses: Lake Champlain
- Locale: Crown Point, New York and Chimney Point, Vermont
- Other name: Crown Point Bridge
- Maintained by: NYSDOT and VTrans
- ID number: 5521180

Characteristics
- Design: Continuous truss (combination of through truss, deck truss, and deck plate girders)
- Total length: 14 spans totaling 2,184 feet (666 m)
- Width: 26.1 feet (8.0 m)
- Longest span: 434 feet (132 m)

History
- Construction cost: $1,149,032.63
- Opened: August 26, 1929
- Closed: October 16, 2009 (closure); December 28, 2009 (demolition)

Statistics
- Daily traffic: 3,510 (2007)
- Toll: 1929–1987

Location
- Interactive map of Champlain Bridge

The Champlain Bridge (also known as the Crown Point Bridge) was a 2,184-foot-long (666 m) vehicular bridge in the United States that traversed Lake Champlain between Crown Point, New York and Chimney Point, Vermont. It was opened to traffic in 1929 as a toll bridge; the tolls were removed in 1987. The bridge was closed due to safety concerns on October 16, 2009, and was taken down by explosive demolition on December 28, 2009. It was replaced by a new bridge which opened on November 7, 2011.

It was one of two bridges connecting New York and Vermont across Lake Champlain. Ferries provide connections between the states at other points along the lake. The bridge connected NY 185 in New York to VT 17 in Vermont. The half-mile, two-lane, continuous truss bridge was jointly owned and maintained by the New York State Department of Transportation and the Vermont Agency of Transportation.

== Description ==
The bridge crossed Lake Champlain at a point 12 miles (19 km) north of Ticonderoga, New York, and 32 miles (51 km) south of Burlington, Vermont. It connected NY 185 in Crown Point, New York, to VT 17 in Chimney Point, Vermont. It stood at one of only two bridge sites that link New York and Vermont across the lake. The other bridge is on U.S. Route 2, spanning between Rouses Point, New York and Alburgh, Vermont, near the Canada–United States border.

== History ==
=== Opening, repairs, and closure ===
The bridge opened to traffic on August 26, 1929. It was one of the first continuous truss road bridges built in the nation, and exhibited characteristics of both a through truss and deck truss design. The bridge was tolled until September 22, 1987. The bridge was rehabilitated in 1991. Work performed at that time included the replacement of the deck and railings, the repainting of the steel trusses, and the repairing of the bridge piers.

In 2007, the New York State Department of Transportation (NYSDOT) and the Vermont Agency of Transportation (VTrans) announced formation of an advisory committee to plan the rehabilitation or replacement of the Champlain Bridge. At the time, the projected start date for the project was 2012. In 2009, an inspection performed on the bridge as part of the planning process revealed that two of the bridge's support piers were not structurally sound. As a result, the bridge was closed to all traffic on October 16, 2009. NYSDOT Regional Structural Engineer Thomas Hoffman commented that "under certain conditions we were afraid the bridge could fail abruptly." Prior to the closing, the bridge had already been reduced to one lane for structural steel repairs.

=== Effects of the closure ===
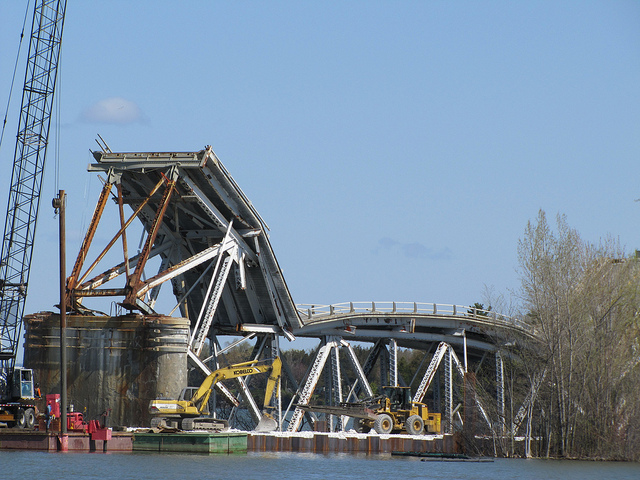
The demolished Champlain Bridge, April 2010.

The closure of the bridge caused economic hardship for commuters and local businesses as traffic was greatly reduced on both sides of the lake. Two businesses that saw more activity were private ferry services; one about 15 miles (24 km) south of the bridge was overwhelmed, while the other (about 25 miles (40 km) north of the bridge) expanded its hours of operation. Even with expanded hours, and New York state subsidies, the two private services could not meet demand. The state explored adding a ferry at the bridge location, and the Basin Harbor Club made its tour boat available to ferry pedestrians. Since the lake freezes in winter, an ice-breaker would be required to keep the ferry services running. The Ticonderoga Ferry was forced to suspend service due to icy conditions from December 17 to December 20, 2009.

On February 1, 2010, Lake Champlain Transportation started a new ferry service at the site of the demolished bridge, operating with two boats, departing each side of the crossing every 15 minutes, 24 hours a day as a free service subsidized by NYSDOT.

=== Demolition and replacement ===
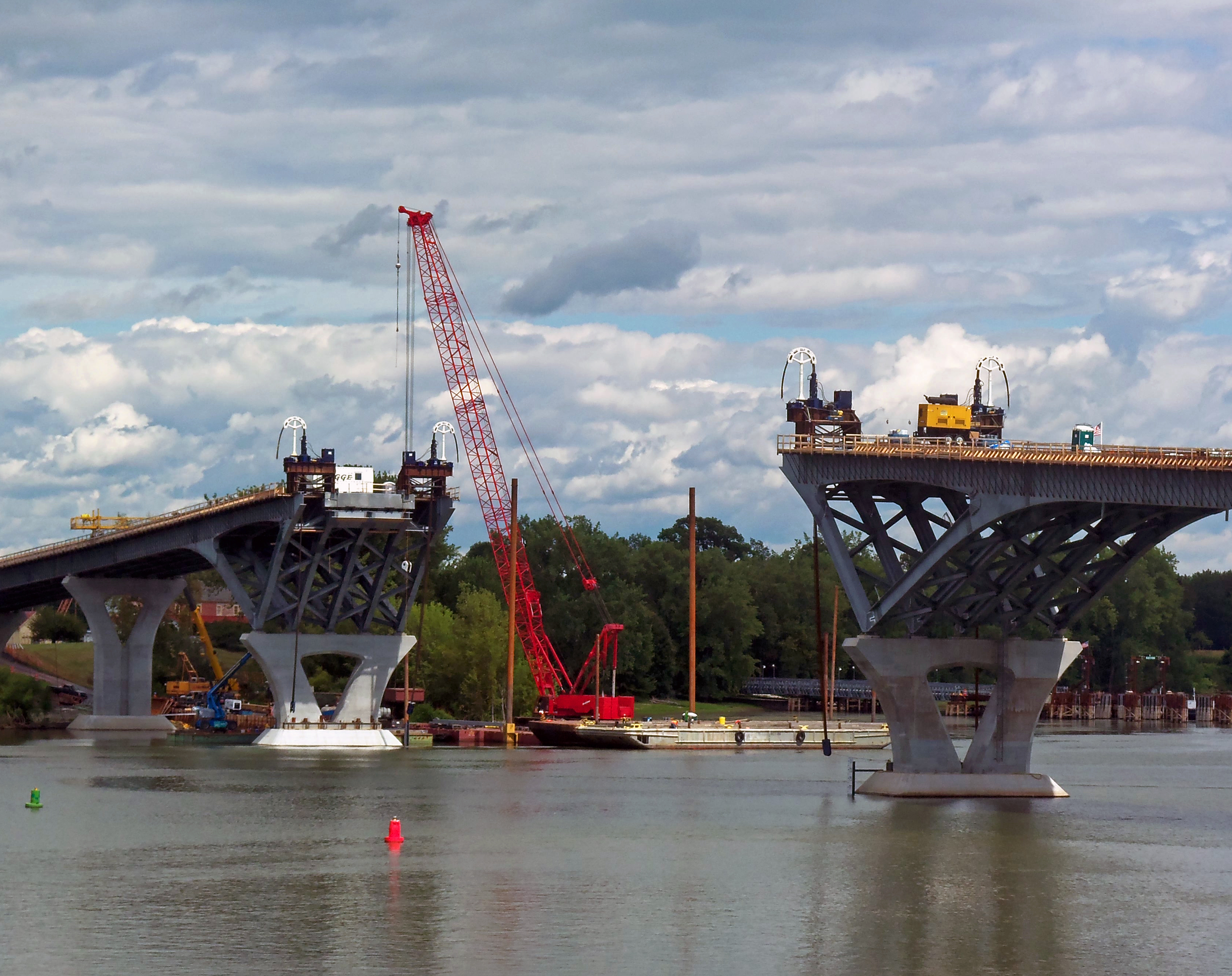
Replacement bridge under construction, August 2011

On November 9, 2009, officials in Vermont and New York announced that the bridge was beyond repair and would have to be demolished. Removal of the existing bridge was accomplished by explosive demolition, and was originally scheduled for December 23, 2009. On December 22, officials moved the demolition date to December 28 as a result of the formation of ice on Lake Champlain and cold weather in the area; both factors led to delays in installing the necessary explosives for demolition. The bridge was demolished at 10:03 am on December 28, 2009.

The bridge was replaced by a new structure, a Modified Network Tied Arch concept design. Flatiron Constructors of Longmont, Colorado, the U.S. subsidiary of German firm Hochtief, won the contract for the new bridge, and groundbreaking took place on June 11, 2010. The replacement bridge opened to traffic on November 7, 2011.

== See also ==
- List of bridges documented by the Historic American Engineering Record in New York (state)
