= St. George, Vermont =

- Town
- Logo

- Location in Chittenden County and the state of Vermont.
- Coordinates: 44°22′40″N 73°07′31″W
- Country: United States
- State: Vermont
- County: Chittenden

Area
  - Total: 3.6 sq mi (9.2 km^{2})
  - Land: 3.6 sq mi (9.2 km^{2})
  - Water: 0 sq mi (0.0 km^{2})
- Elevation: 804 ft (245 m)

Population (2020)
  - Total: 794
  - Density: 224/sq mi (86.3/km^{2})
- Time zone: UTC-5 (Eastern (EST))
  - Summer (DST): UTC-4 (EDT)
- ZIP code: 05495
- Area code: 802
- FIPS code: 50-62050
- GNIS feature ID: 1462198
- Website: www.stgeorgevt.com

St. George or Saint George is a town in Chittenden County, Vermont, United States. The town was named for the patron saint of England. St. George has the smallest land area of any town in Vermont, though the incorporated cities of St. Albans, Vergennes, and Winooski are smaller. The population was 794 at the 2020 census.

== Geography ==
St. George is bordered by the town of Shelburne to the west, Williston to the northeast, and Hinesburg to the south. It is 10 miles (16 km) southeast of Burlington. According to the United States Census Bureau, the town has a total area of 3.6 square miles (9.2 km^{2}), all land. The southwest part of St. George comprises the St. George census-designated place.

== Demographics ==
Historical population
Census	Pop.	Note	%±
1790	57		—
1800	65		14.0%
1810	28		−56.9%
1820	120		328.6%
1830	135		12.5%
1840	121		−10.4%
1850	127		5.0%
1860	121		−4.7%
1870	111		−8.3%
1880	93		−16.2%
1890	106		14.0%
1900	90		−15.1%
1910	109		21.1%
1920	100		−8.3%
1930	84		−16.0%
1940	87		3.6%
1950	117		34.5%
1960	108		−7.7%
1970	477		341.7%
1980	677		41.9%
1990	705		4.1%
2000	698		−1.0%
2010	674		−3.4%
2020	794		17.8%
U.S. Decennial Census

As of the census of 2000, there were 698 people, 264 households, and 200 families residing in the town. The population density was 194.5 people per square mile (75.1/km^{2}). There were 277 housing units at an average density of 77.2 per square mile (29.8/km^{2}). The racial makeup of the town was 98.14% White, 0.57% African American, 0.14% Native American, and 1.15% from two or more races. Hispanic or Latino of any race were 1.15% of the population.

There were 264 households, out of which 43.6% had children under the age of 18 living with them, 58.0% were married couples living together, 10.6% had a female householder with no husband present, and 24.2% were non-families. 18.6% of all households were made up of individuals, and 4.9% had someone living alone who was 65 years of age or older. The average household size was 2.64 and the average family size was 2.97.

In the town, the population was spread out, with 29.9% under the age of 18, 6.7% from 18 to 24, 33.8% from 25 to 44, 22.8% from 45 to 64, and 6.7% who were 65 years of age or older. The median age was 34 years. For every 100 females, there were 105.3 males. For every 100 females age 18 and over, there were 103.8 males.

The median income for a household in the town was $44,028, and the median income for a family was $43,438. Males had a median income of $33,036 versus $24,375 for females. The per capita income for the town was $22,882. About 7.5% of families and 8.9% of the population were below the poverty line, including 13.7% of those under age 18 and none of those age 65 or over.

== Notable people ==
- Jean Ankeney, Vermont state senator
- Paul Dame, chair of the Vermont Republican party
