= Lake Champlain Bridge (2011–present) =

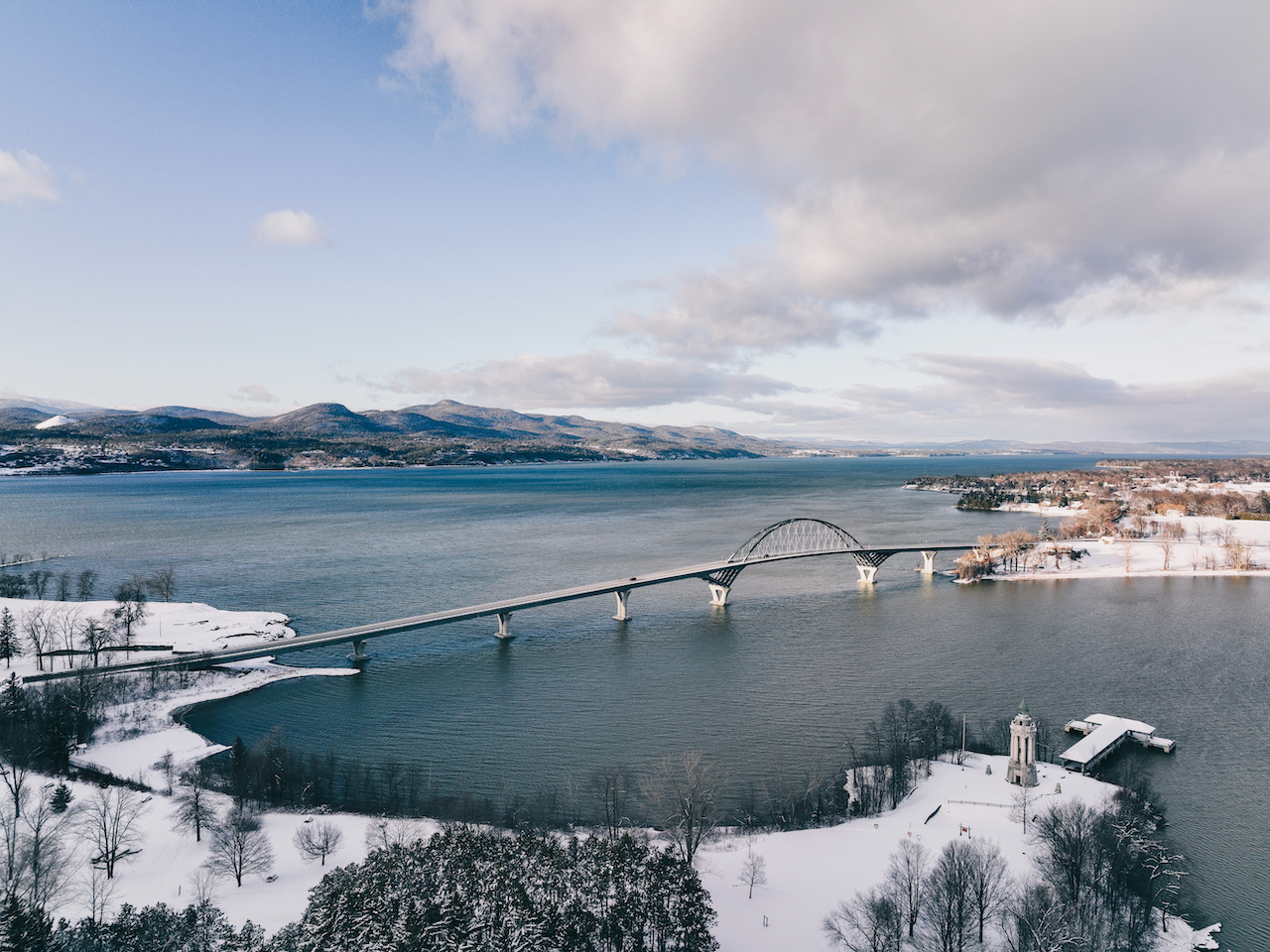
- View of the bridge looking north in December 2021
- Coordinates: 44°01′57″N 73°25′24″W
- Carries: Two lanes of NY 185 and VT 17
- Crosses: Lake Champlain
- Locale: Crown Point, New York and Chimney Point, Vermont
- Maintained by: NYSDOT and VTrans

Characteristics
- Design: Modified network tied arch
- Total length: 2,200 ft (670 m)
- Longest span: 480 ft (150 m) (clear span); 402 ft (123 m) (tied arch span)

History
- Opened: November 7, 2011

Location
- Interactive map of Lake Champlain Bridge

The Lake Champlain Bridge is a vehicular bridge traversing Lake Champlain between Crown Point, New York and Chimney Point, Vermont. It replaced an older bridge that was demolished in 2009. The bridge was designed and constructed during an aggressive two-year schedule to minimize the social and economic impact of the original bridge's demolition. It is the only fixed-link crossing of Lake Champlain/Champlain canal between US 4 in Whitehall, 42 miles (68 km) to the south and US 2 at Rouses Point, 85 miles (137 km) to the north.

The main arch span was prefabricated off-site in Port Henry, floated by barge to the already-constructed approach spans, and then lifted into place on August 26, 2011. The completed bridge was originally scheduled to open on October 9, 2011, but this was pushed back around a month due to construction delays from underwater debris and record flooding.

The bridge opened to the public on Monday, November 7, 2011, following a ribbon-cutting ceremony.

== Description ==
After state inspectors determined in October 2009 that the 80-year-old previous Champlain Bridge had deteriorated beyond repair, the states of New York and Vermont agreed to replace it. The new bridge employs a modified network tied arch design. Flatiron Constructors of Broomfield, Colorado, the U.S. subsidiary of the German firm, Hochtief, won the contract for the new bridge, and groundbreaking took place on June 11, 2010. The bridge construction contract was for $69.6 million. It was completed six weeks ahead of schedule, but at a cost of $78.29 million.

== Gallery ==
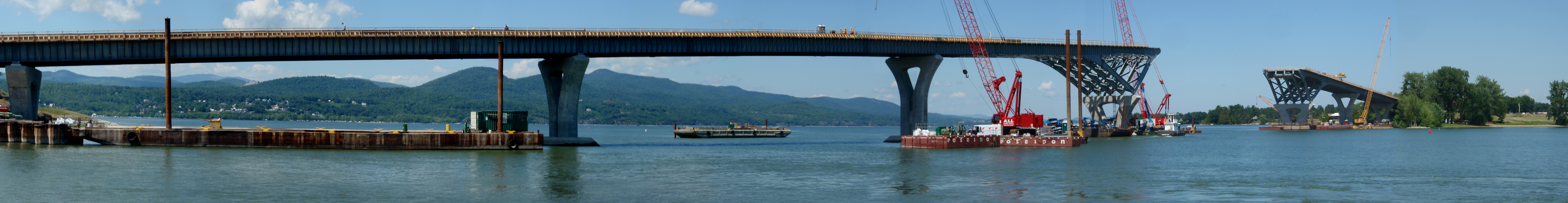
A panorama of the replacement bridge under construction in July 2011. The main arch span was brought in by barge and raised between the two approach spans shown above.
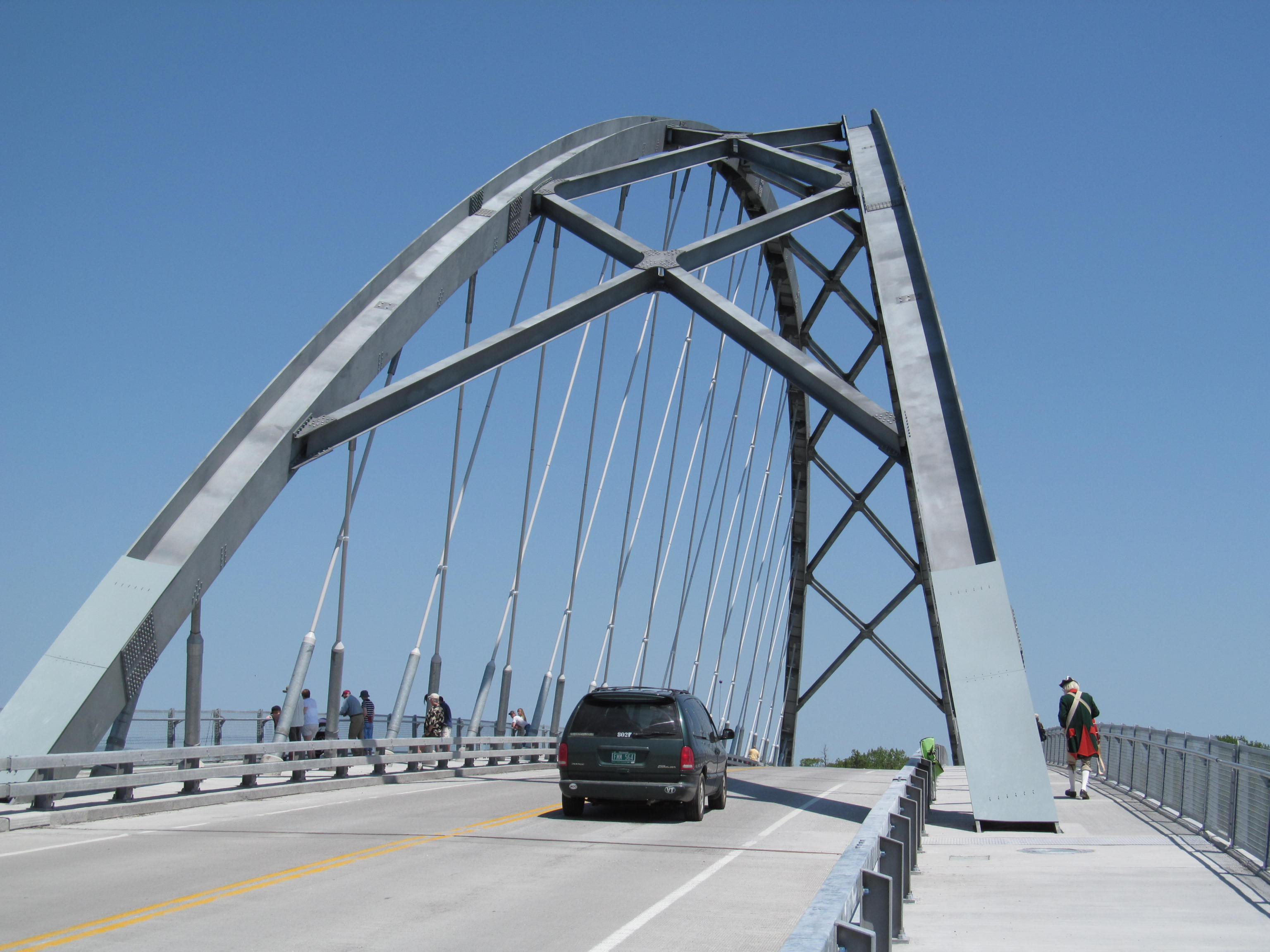
View from the bridge deck during the "Grand Celebration" for the re-opening of the Lake Champlain Bridge on May 19, 2012.

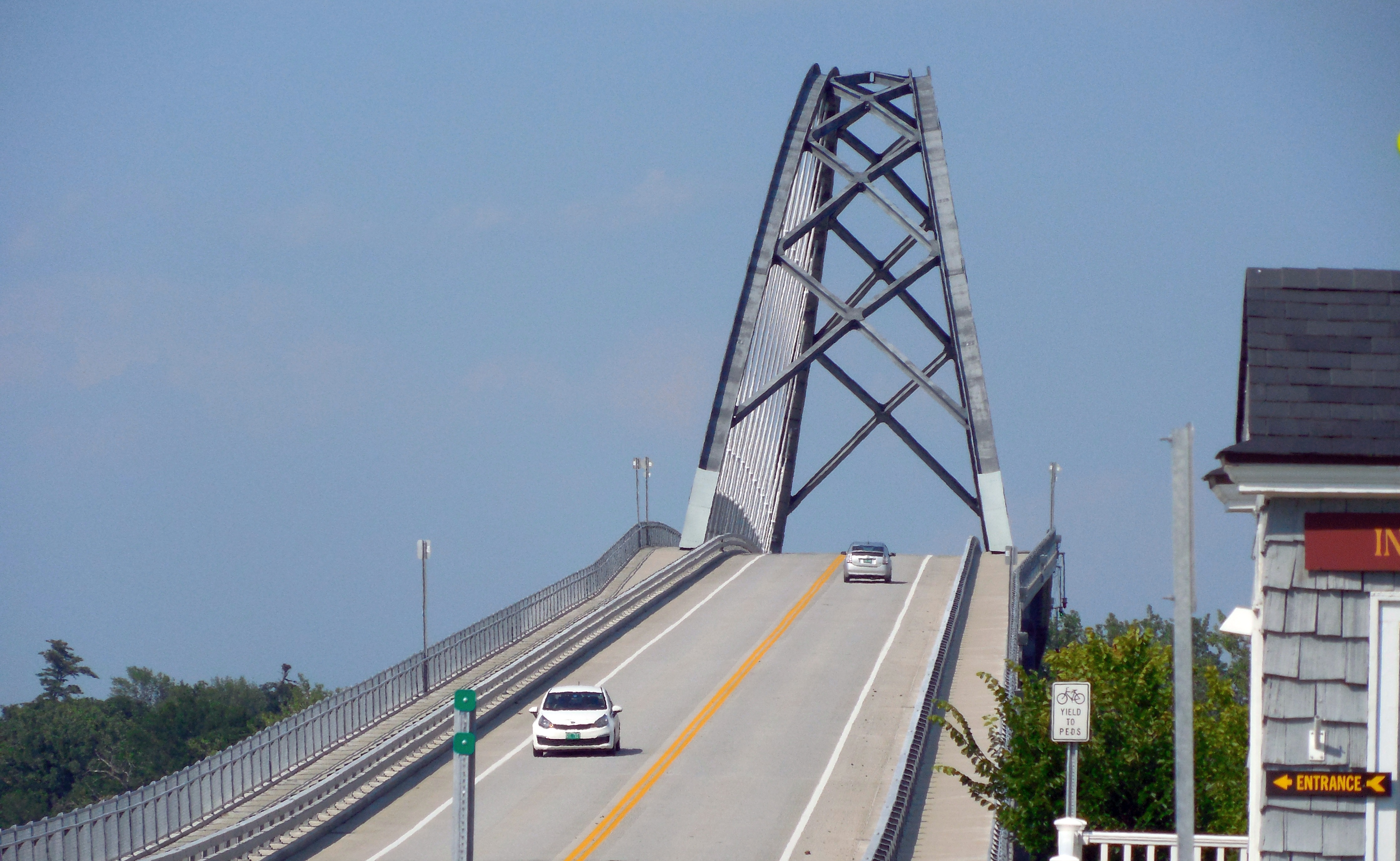
View of Lake Champlain Bridge from Crown Point.

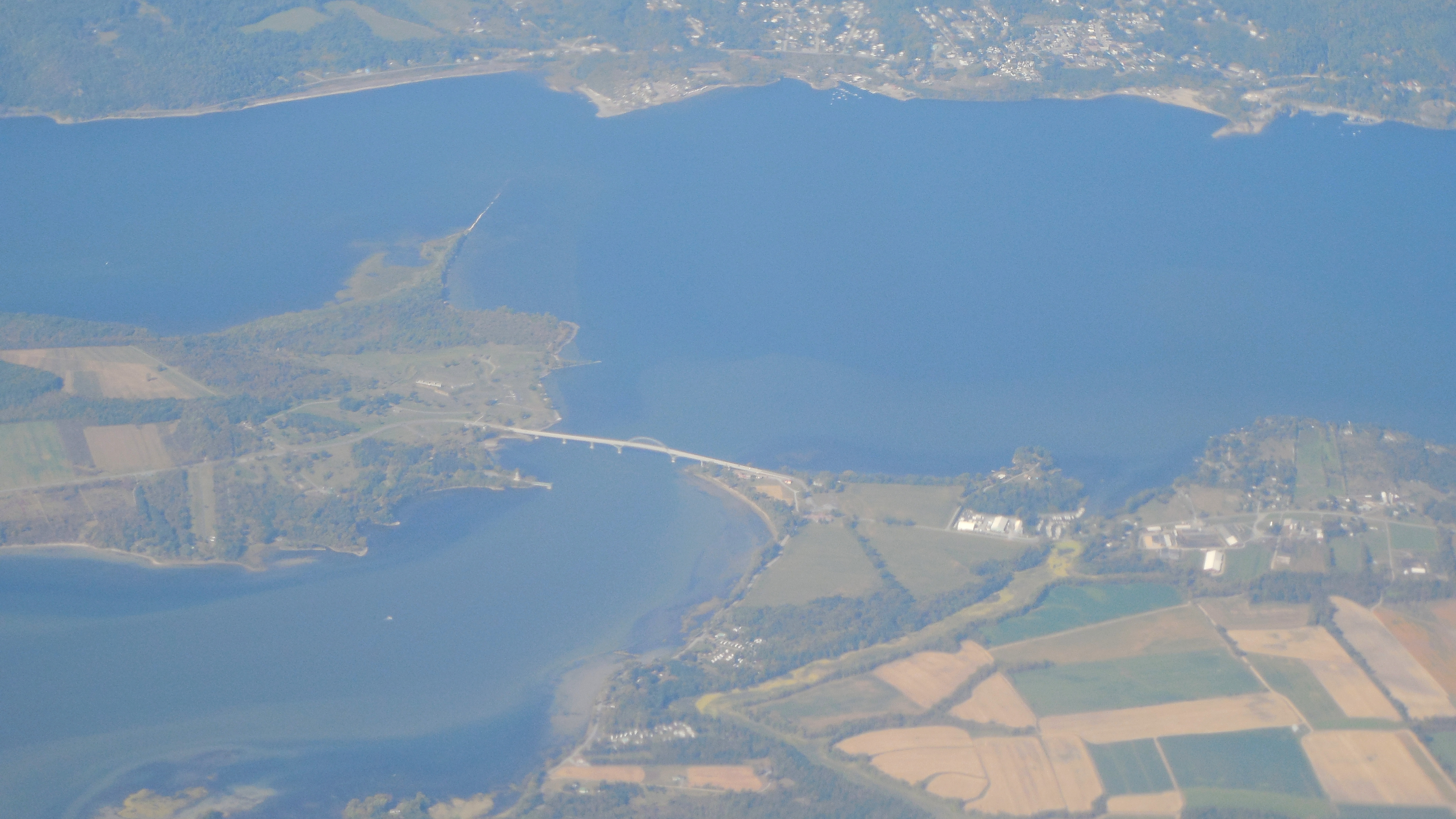
Aerial view of Lake Champlain Bridge connecting Addison, Vermont (right) & Crown Point, New York (left).

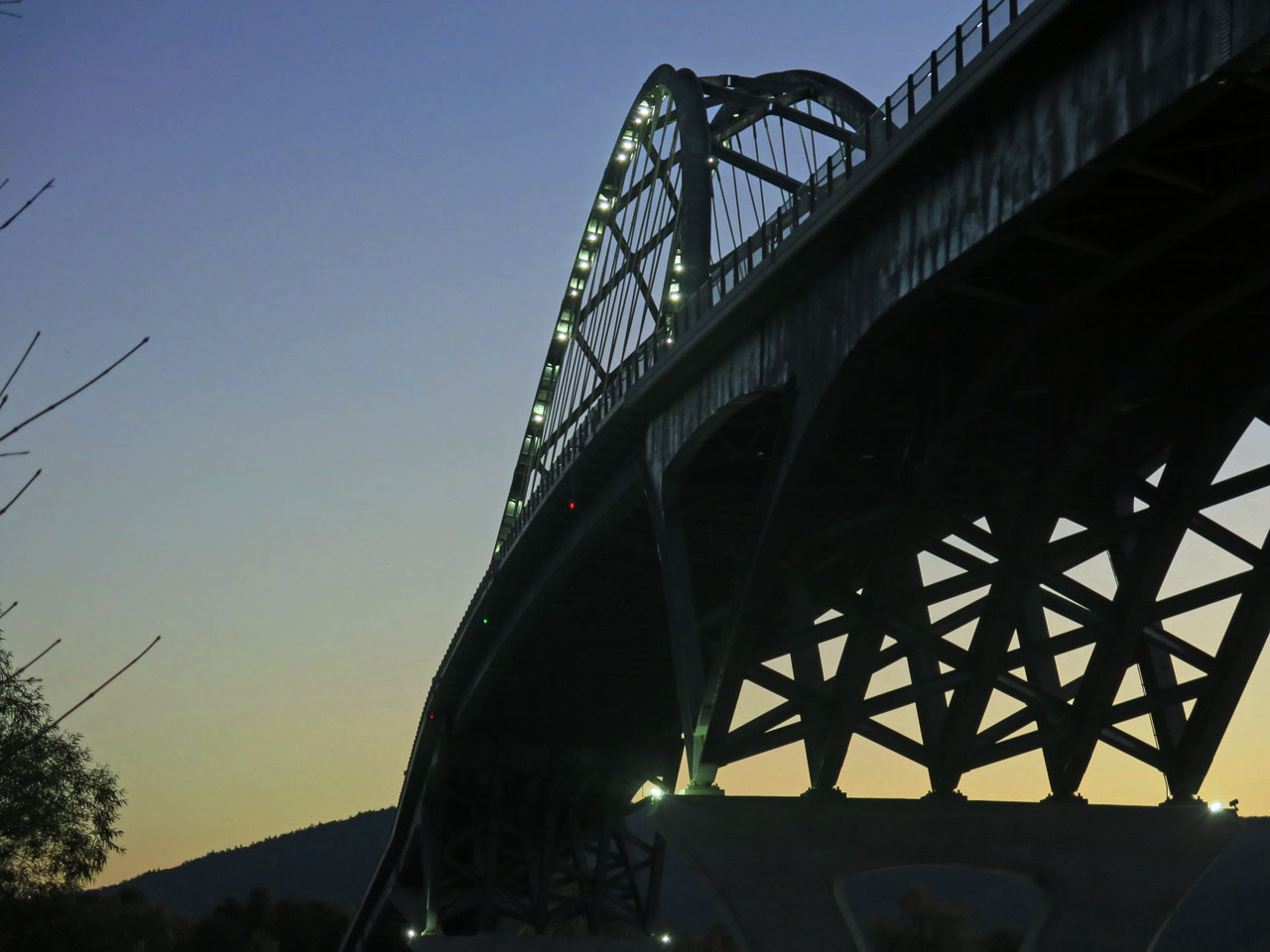
View from below the Lake Champlain Bridge on the Vermont side on Chimney Point.

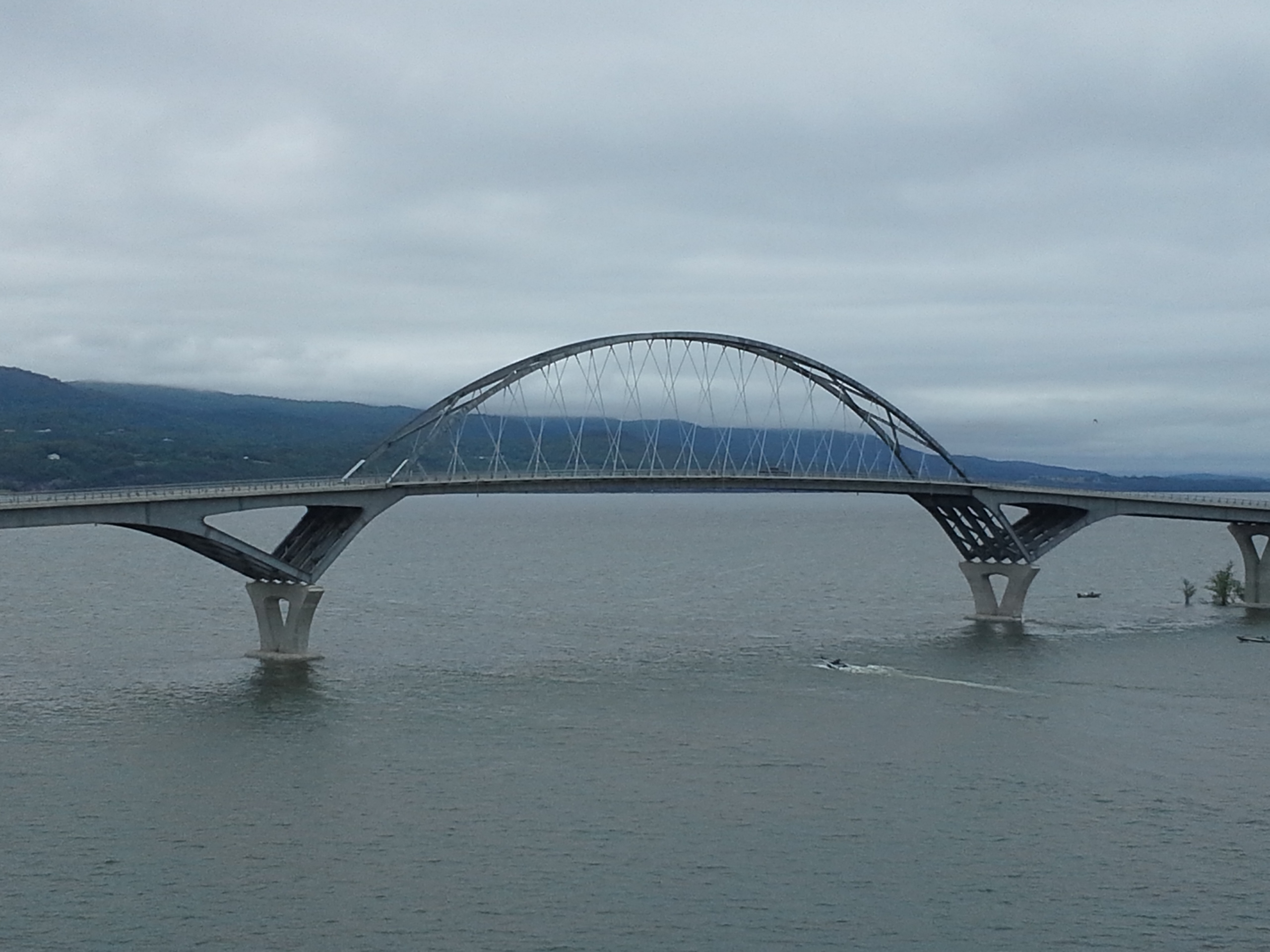
The completed bridge, as seen from the Crown Point Light
