= Chimney Point, Vermont =

History museum in Addison, Vermont, US

Chimney Point State Historic Site
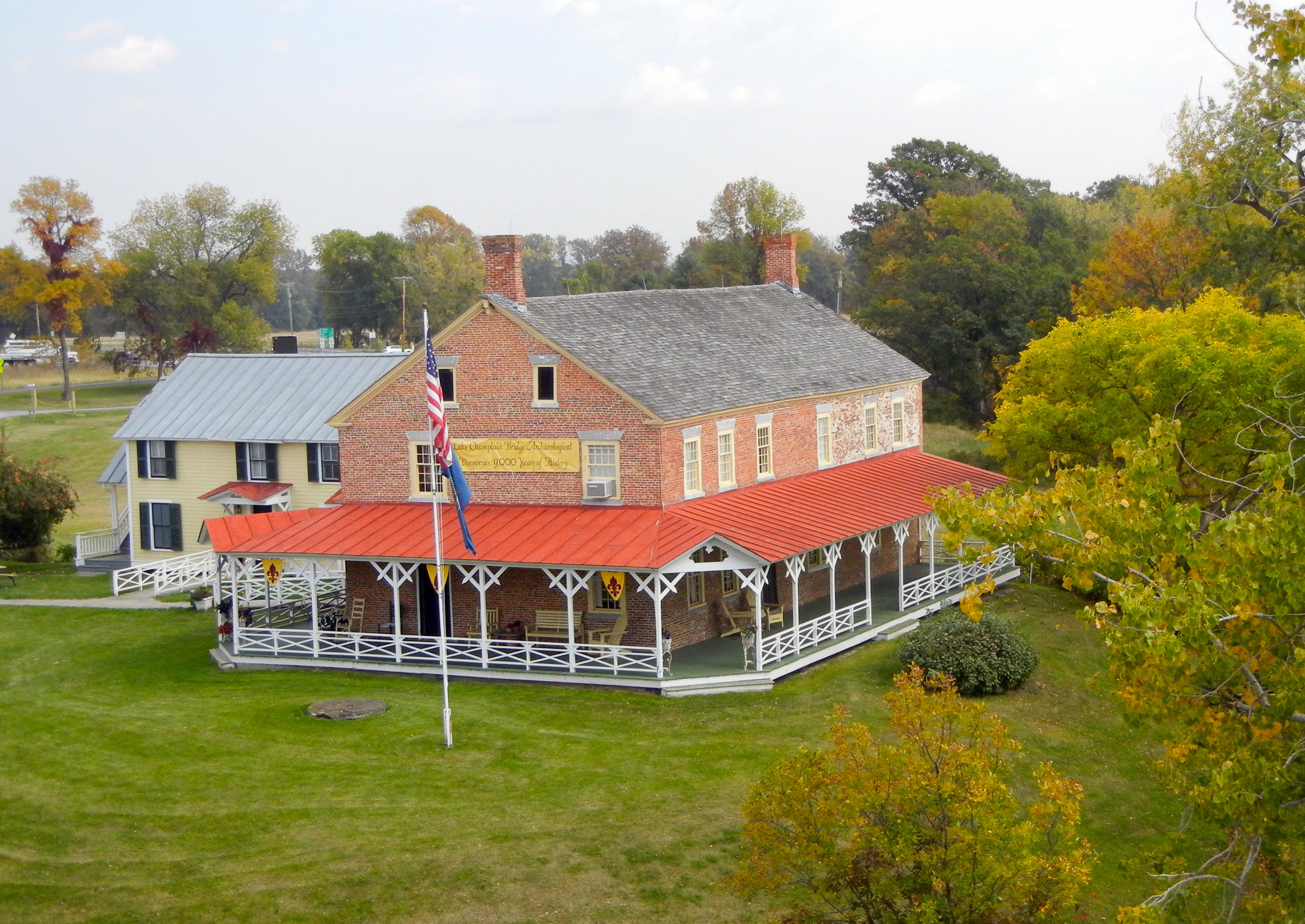
- The historic tavern at Chimney Point
- Established: 1991
- Location: 8149 VT Route 17W; Addison, Vermont
- Coordinates: 44°02′10″N 73°25′05″W
- Type: History museum
- Owner: State of Vermont
- Website: Chimney Point State Historic Site

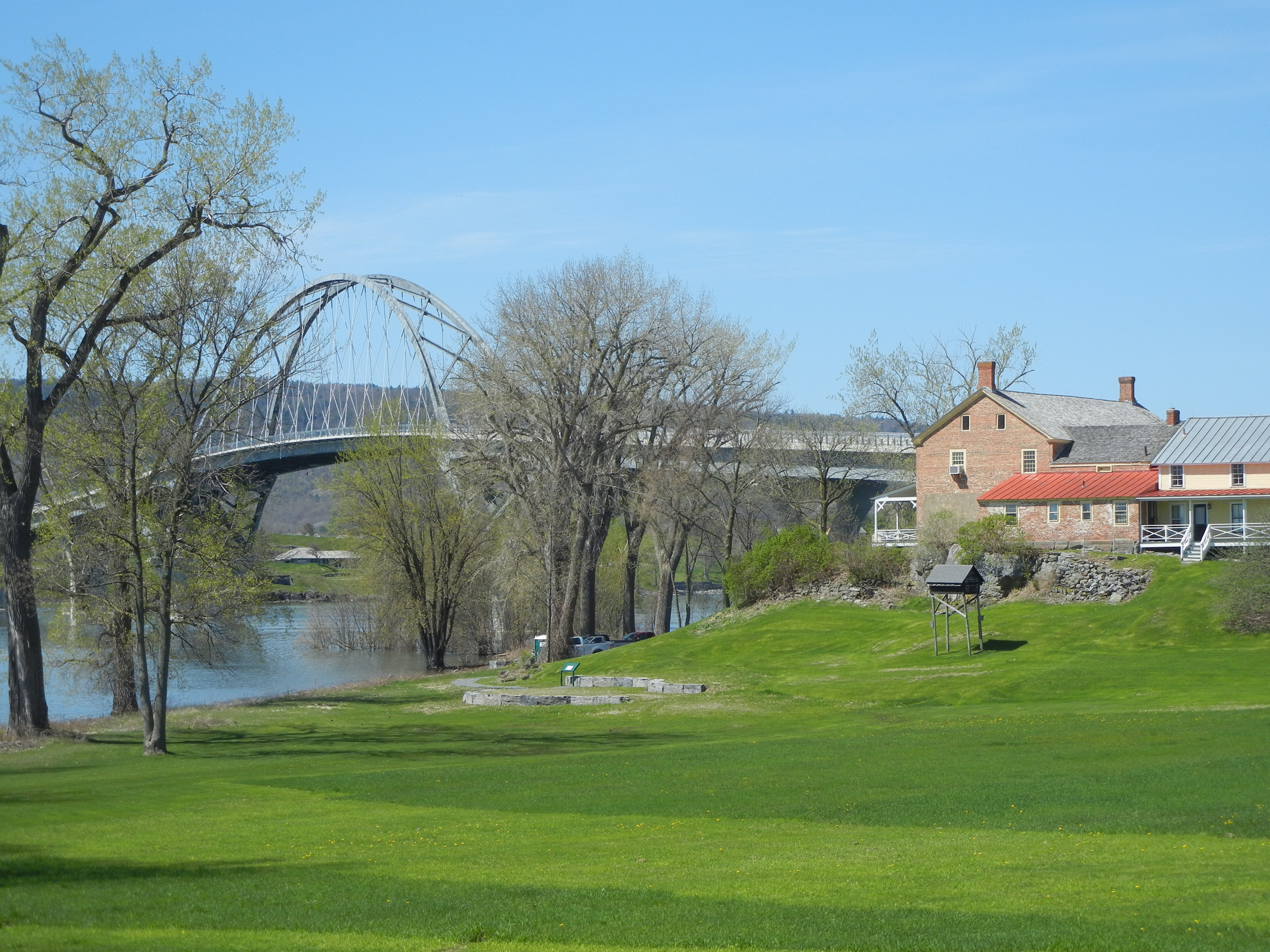
A view of Chimney Point, Vermont, showing the State Historic Site and the Lake Champlain Bridge

Chimney Point is a peninsula in the town of Addison, Vermont, which juts into Lake Champlain forming a narrows. It is one of the earliest settled and most strategic sites in the Champlain Valley.

For thousands of years, the locale was occupied by Native Americans. In 1731 it was settled by the French, who built fortifications and houses on both sides of the lake.

Along with the Crown Point peninsula across the narrows, the area was the site of conflicts between Great Britain and France as they struggled for control of North America. During the American Revolutionary War, Chimney Point was occupied at different times by both the American and British armies.

With the end of the war in 1783, American settlers returned to the Champlain Valley. In 1785, regular ferry service across the lake was established to and from Chimney Point. A tavern, once visited by Thomas Jefferson and James Madison, served travelers and the community.

In 1929, the first Lake Champlain Bridge opened. It increased traffic and improved communication between Vermont and upstate New York. Following the discovery of deterioration in the piers in 2009, that bridge was demolished and replaced by a new bridge, which opened in 2011.

Chimney Point is a Vermont State Historic Site, preserving a 1785 tavern and presenting the story of three cultures, Native American, French Colonial, and early-American.

== Geography ==
Vermont, showing Lake Champlain

The Chimney Point peninsula is bounded by Lake Champlain and Hospital Creek. At its narrowest, Lake Champlain is about .3 miles (0.48 km) across at Chimney Point. The Lake Champlain Bridge is one of only two bridges across the lake in its length of 125 miles (201 km).

The spot is a favorite with anglers. A boat launch at Chimney Point allows access to the lake.

== History ==
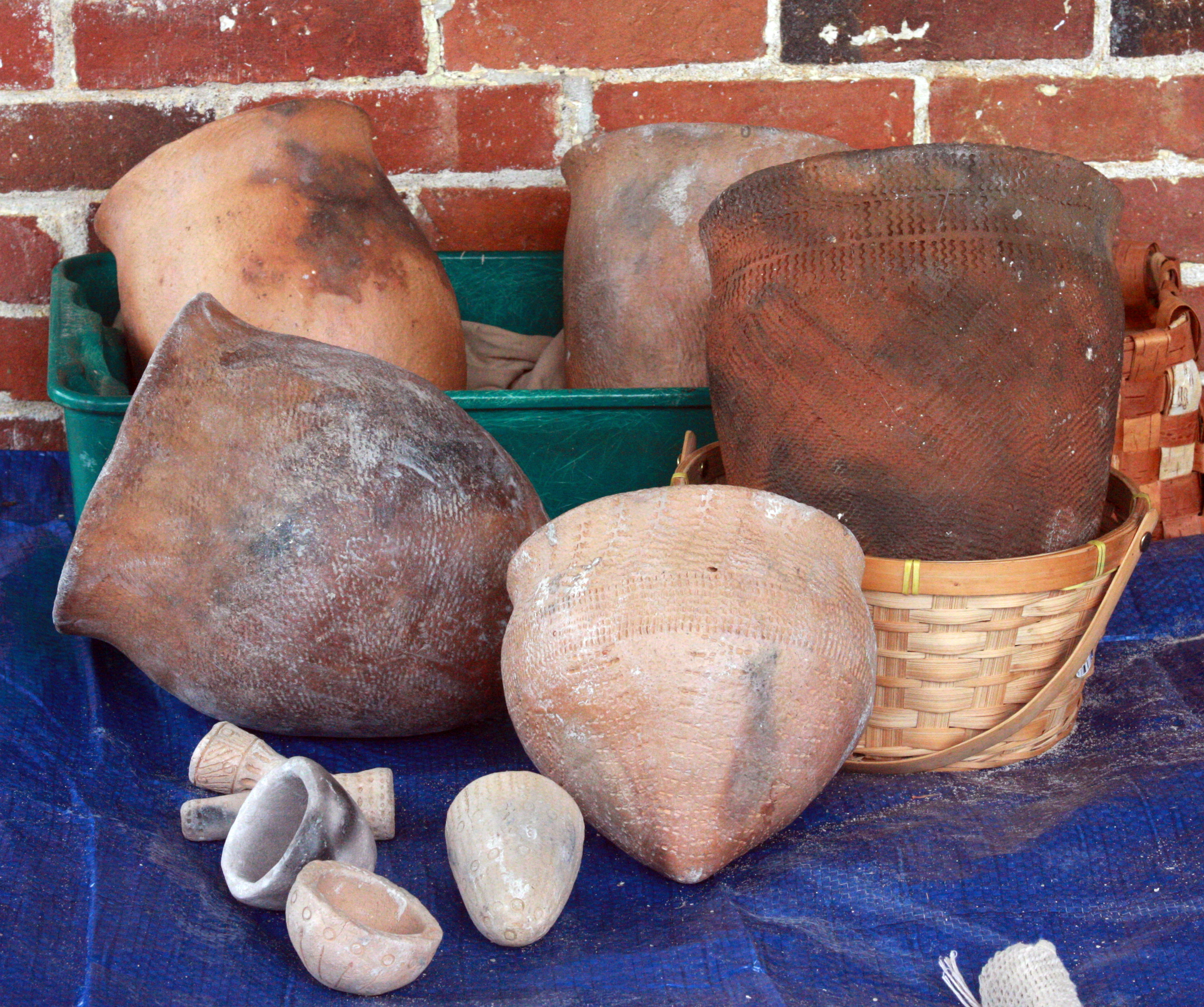
Ceramic pots created by a modern potter in the style of the Woodland period, on display at Chimney Point

=== Indigenous peoples ===
Archeologists have found evidence of human habitation in the Chimney Point area for as long as 7,500 years. Native Americans camped, hunted, and fished at Chimney Point. Their tools show they adapted to a warming climate and moved with the seasons to hunt, fish, and gather food. They made spear throwers and stone spear points for hunting animals, and stone tools for cutting, scraping, and working wood and other stone. In the Woodland period, the native peoples made ceramic pots for storage of foodstuff, water, and use with foods and produce.

=== French settlement ===
Samuel de Champlain was the first European to explore the lake that settlers later named for him. In 1609 he traveled at least as far south as present-day Ticonderoga, 13 miles (21 km) from Chimney Point.

There were years of conflict between the French and English in North America as they competed for power, territory, and the fur trade. King William's War continued with actions from 1688 to 1697 as the North American front of the Nine Years War in Europe. With sparse numbers of colonists, both sides made allies among Native American peoples to aid them in their warfare.

In 1690, the British governor of New York sent Captain Jacobus de Warm from Albany with orders to watch the French and Indians from Canada on Lake Champlain and to “endeavor to despoil, plunder and do them all injury as enemies, according to the usages of war.” De Warm built a small stone defense at Chimney Point that he, 12 soldiers, and 20 Mohawk allies occupied for about a month.

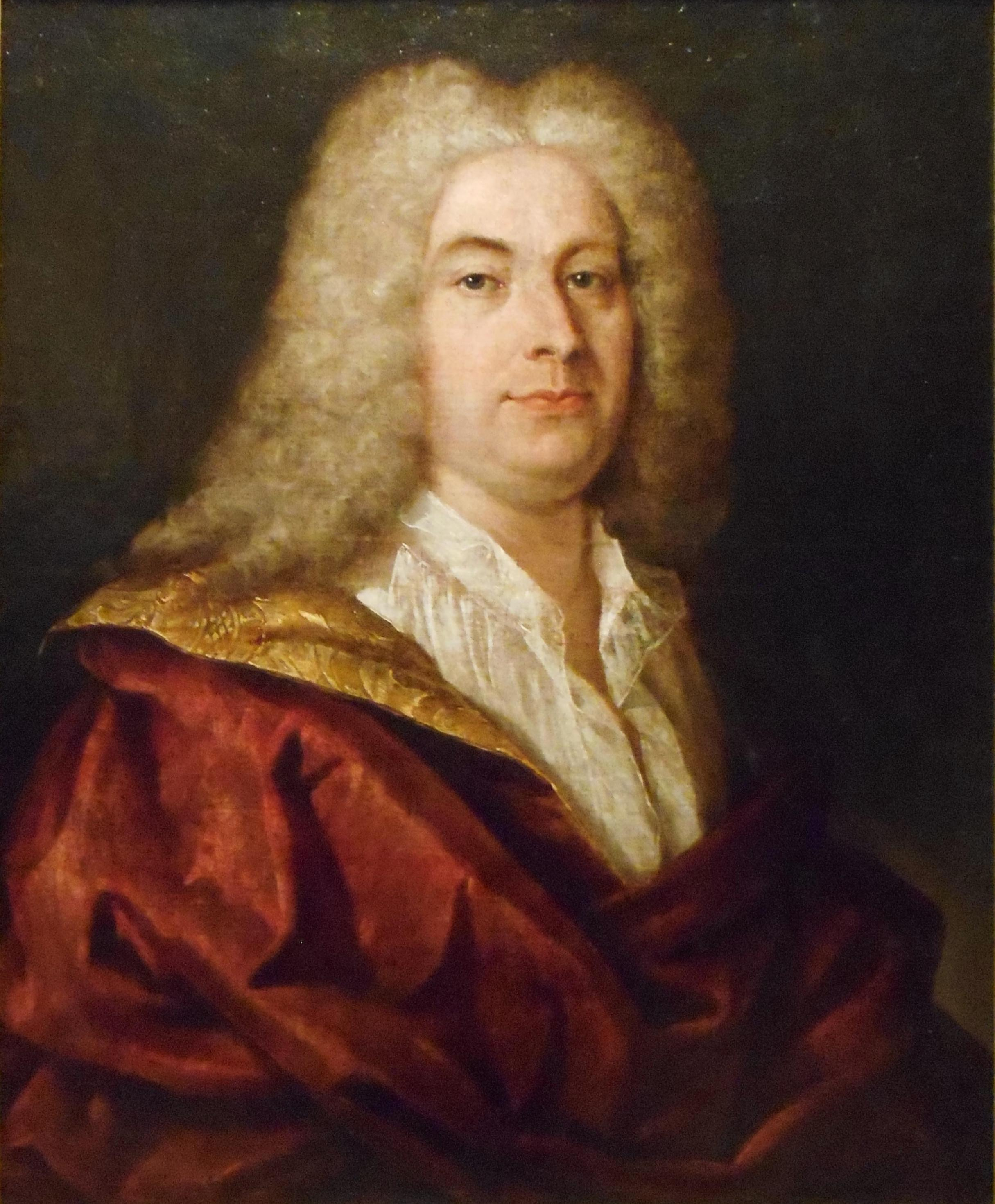
Gilles Hocquart

In 1731, the French occupied the area, first building a stockade fort on the bluff at Pointe-à-la-Chevelure, today's Chimney Point. In 1734 or 1735, they began construction on the stone Fort St. Frédéric on the west side of the lake. At first both sides were considered part of a single royal domaine with Louis XV as seigneur.

In 1743, Gilles Hocquart, Intendant of New France, was granted a seigneurie of approximately 115,000 acres (47,000 ha) on the east shore of the lake, much of today's Addison County. French settlement on Lake Champlain was both military and agricultural with farms on both sides of the lake. The population of settlers at Pointe-à-la-Chevelure peaked at the beginning of the French and Indian War (1754–1763), at approximately 150 with 21 houses on the east side of the lake and 19 on the west.

=== French and Indian War ===
The French settlement at Pointe-à-la-Chevelure was close to major fighting in the French and Indian War, which took place at the southern end of Lake George (Lac du Saint-Sacrement) and at Fort Ticonderoga (Carillon).

When Major Robert Rogers, commander of the provincial ranger forces, scouted Fort St. Frédéric in early May 1756, he found settlements on the west side of the lake largely abandoned and was able to observe the fort from across the lake. The party slaughtered 23 head of cattle before returning to Fort William Henry on Lake George.

In the summer of 1759, as British Major General Jeffery Amherst and his army of 12,000 men seized Ticonderoga, the French retreated north to Canada, blowing up Fort St. Frédéric and burning houses on both sides of the lake. A remaining chimney on the east shore gave the area its new English name, Chimney Point.

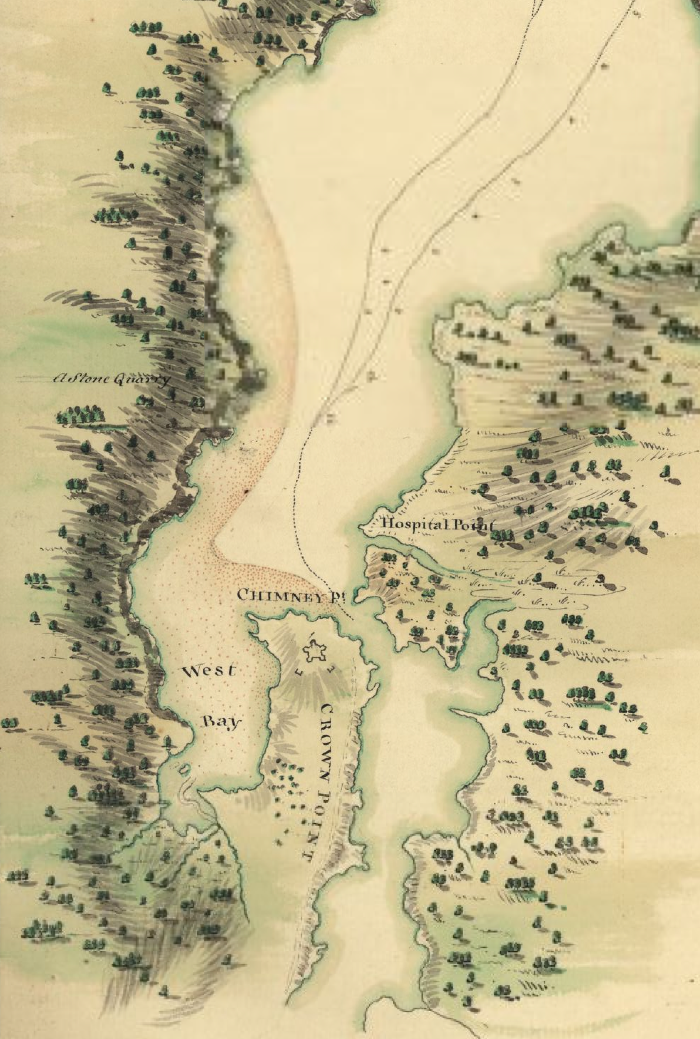
A section of a 1779 map of Lake Champlain showing Chimney Point and Crown Point

On the west side of the lake, the British built massive Fort Crown Point with forty-foot-high walls and a six-acre parade ground, but it was destroyed by fire in 1773. When a British engineer inspected the fort in 1774, he found it to be “an amazing useless mass of Earth only.”

=== American Revolutionary War ===
During the American Revolution, Chimney Point's fate was closely tied to that of Crown Point. A small British garrison at Crown Point was captured by Americans under Captain Seth Warner on May 11, 1775. For nearly a year-and-a-half afterwards, the narrows was an important base for the American army and for their vessels of war on the lake. Headquarters was on the west side of the lake, but Chimney Point was occupied as well. During the American retreat from Canada in June and early July 1776, sick men were cared for on both sides of the lake.

On July 7, 1776, a council of generals presided over by Major General Philip Schuyler, commander of the Northern Department, ordered the army to withdraw from Crown Point and to fortify a peninsula opposite Fort Ticonderoga, later named Mount Independence. Among reasons for the withdrawal, Schuyler believed that American fortifications on the Crown Point side of the lake would be vulnerable to cannon fire from Chimney Point.

Until the defeat of the American fleet at the Battle of Valcour Island, the Crown Point-Chimney Point narrows remained an advanced outpost and naval base. With the approach of the British on October 13, 1776, the Americans destroyed defenses and buildings. Settlers on both sides of the lake fled south, leaving, wrote one observer, their houses and all their possessions “to the enemy, or to the flames.”

The British under Governor General Guy Carleton occupied the area from mid-October to early November 1776. Lieutenant General John Burgoyne and his army of 8000 men returned to Crown Point briefly in late June 1777 before continuing south to Ticonderoga and Mount Independence. German troops from the Duchy of Brunswick under command of Major General Friedrich Adolf Riedesel camped at Chimney Point. For the rest of the war, Chimney Point was a no man's land on a lake controlled by the British navy.

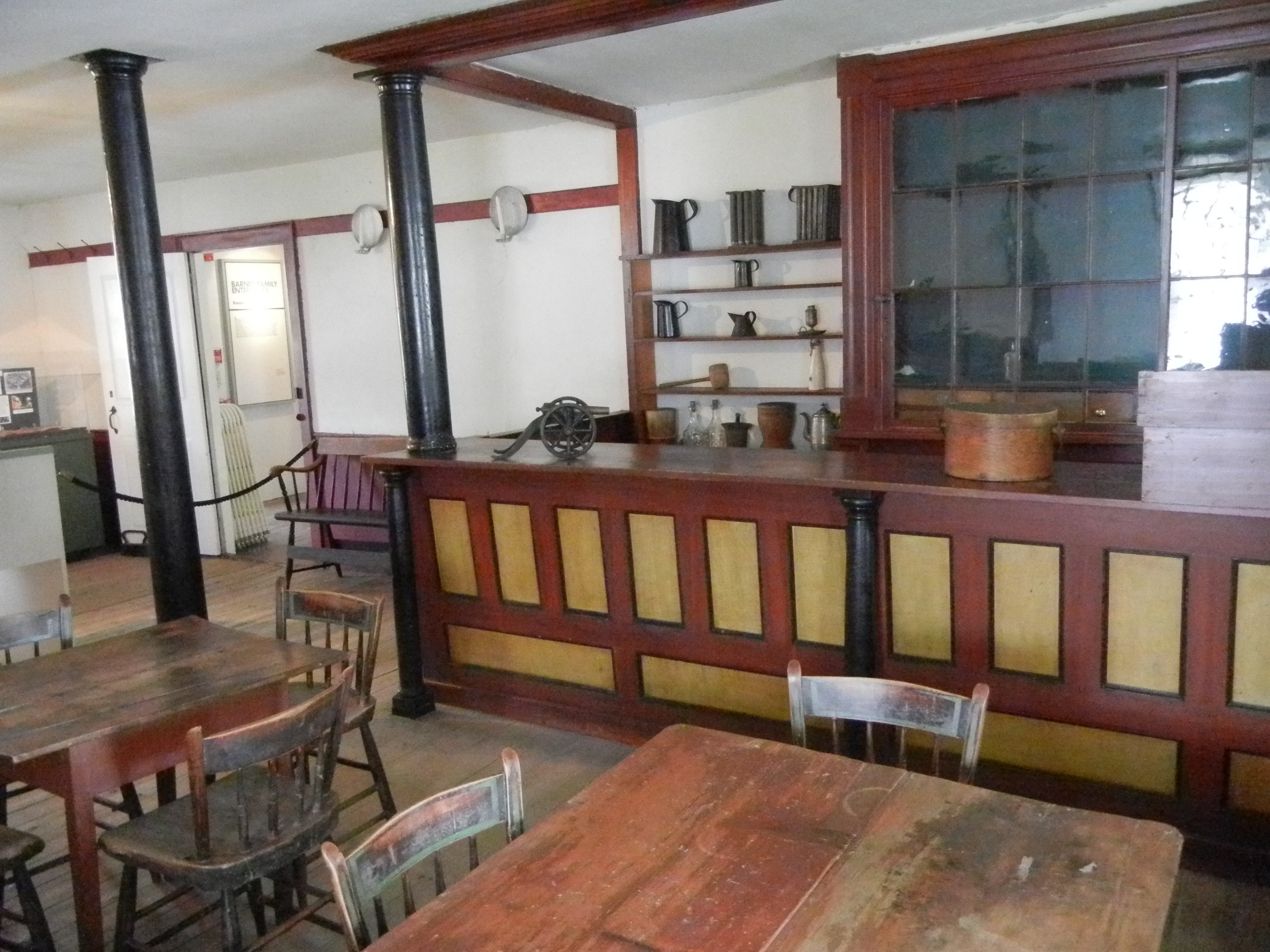
The restored historic tap room at Chimney Point

=== Ferries and steamboats ===
With the end of the Revolutionary War in the mid-1780s, Benjamin Paine built a tavern at Chimney Point and began a ferry service across the lake. By 1826, the ferry was powered by horses and made scheduled crossings to the town of Port Henry, about 3 miles away. The tavern was later enclosed in brick by Asahel Barnes, whose family acquired it in 1821.

In 1890, a steam ferry, the G.R. Sherman made the crossings on a greatly expanded schedule. Also in the 1890s, Millard Barnes enlarged the tavern and operated it as a summer resort, the St. Frederic Inn.

Chimney Point was a stop for passenger steamboats that traveled the lake.

=== Bridges ===
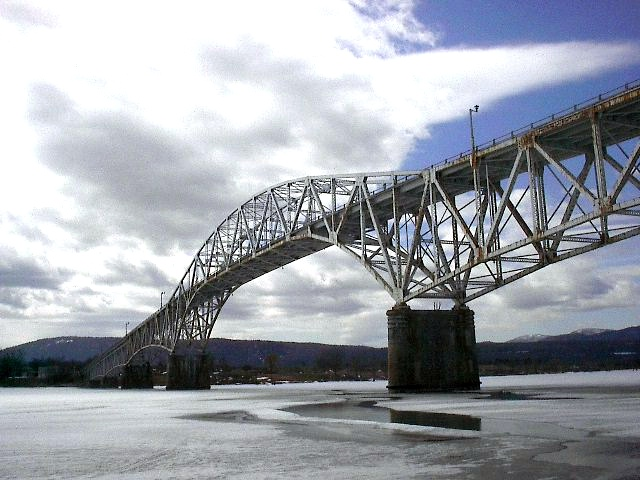
The first Lake Champlain Bridge

The first Lake Champlain Bridge connecting Chimney Point and Crown Point was built from June 1928 to August 1929. It was dedicated on August 29, 1929, with 40,000 people in attendance. Vermont Governor John E. Weeks and New York Governor Franklin D. Roosevelt, three years before his election as president, met at the center of the bridge. For 80 years, the bridge was a crucial link in the life and economy of the Champlain Valley, promoting tourism and tying the two sides of the lake together commercially and socially.

The bridge closed with almost no warning on October 16, 2009, after New York inspectors discovered serious deterioration of the piers. The bridge was demolished two months later. Ferry service reopened early in 2010, carrying more than 1.5 million vehicles and 2.6 passengers across the Chimney Point-Crown Point narrows.

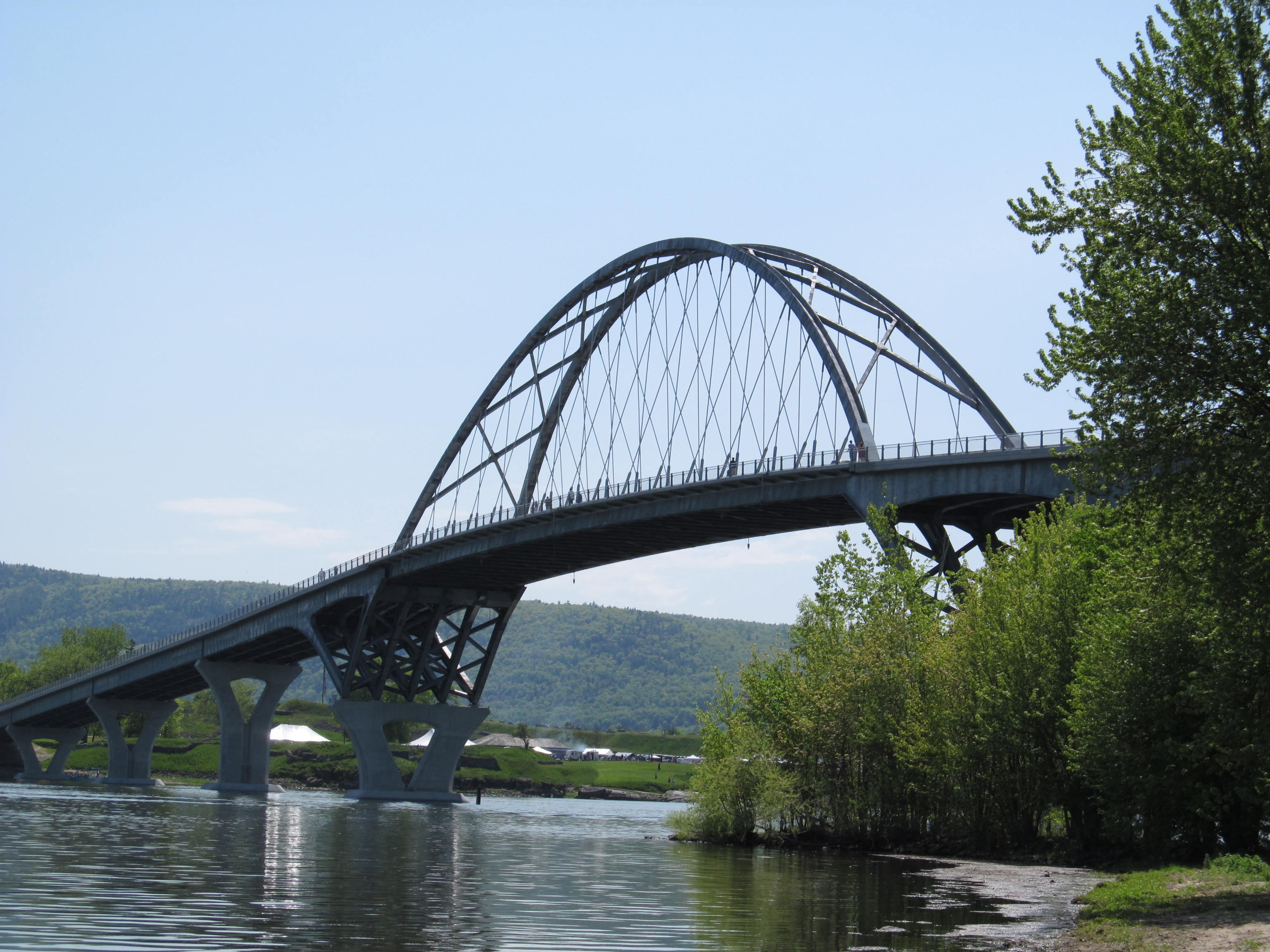
Today's Lake Champlain Bridge

Archeologists from the University of Vermont surveyed the area and worked with engineers and construction crews to protect historically significant sites. Numerous discoveries were made at Chimney Point, include the location of the 1731 French Fort and the foundation of the chimney that likely gave the peninsula its name. A new Lake Champlain Bridge, designed by Ted Zoli of the engineering firm HNTB, was constructed in two years, opening on November 8, 2011. Although the new bridge utilizes a different structural design, its central arch recreates the graceful lines of the earlier bridge. The new bridge has bicycle lanes and sidewalks for pedestrians.

== Notable visitors ==
Noted Swedish-Finnish explorer and naturalist Pehr (Peter) Kalm visited the French settlement at Pointe-à-la-Chevelure in July 1749, staying more than two weeks. In the third volume of his Travels into North America, he included detailed descriptions of the lives of soldiers, the houses at the settlement, Fort St. Frédéric, the wind-mill, and the plants, animals, and minerals of the area.

In 1791, future presidents Thomas Jefferson, then Secretary of State, and Congressman James Madison, accompanied by slaves James Hemings and Matthew, toured upstate New York and eastern New England. On the night May 31, the party stayed in the tavern at Chimney Point. Madison observed, “On Crown point is one family only. On the opposite side the country is well inhabited.”

== Chimney Point in popular culture ==
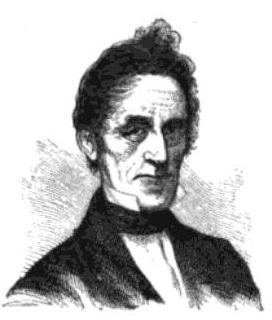
Novelist Daniel Pierce Thompson

A tavern at Chimney Point was featured in the popular 1839 romance, The Green Mountain Boys: A Historical Tale of the Early Settlement of Vermont by Daniel Pierce Thompson. In the novel, which Thompson claimed was based upon "incidents which actually occurred," Green Mountain Boys leaders Ethan Allen and Charles Warrington (a fictionalized Seth Warner) engage in a drinking contest with British soldiers in order to escape capture. Millard Barnes, owner of the St. Frederic Inn, claimed that the tavern in the inn was the location of the legendary drinking bout. In fact, the tavern was built in the mid-1780s, a decade after the exploits of the Green Mountain Boys.

The original Lake Champlain Bridge, although unidentified, played a prominent part in the 2000 supernatural thriller What Lies Beneath, directed by Robert Zemeckis and starring Harrison Ford and Michelle Pfeiffer. In the film, the ghost of a murdered university student lies in the water beneath the bridge.

== Chimney Point State Historic Site ==
In 1966, the State of Vermont bought the Chimney Point property to protect it from private development. In 1971, it was listed in the National Register of Historic Places for its long and significant history. The state restored the tavern, and in 1991 reopened it as a museum. It has one of the most intact early tap rooms as well as a historic rural post office.

Exhibits and special events present the story of the three early cultures in the Chimney Point area — prehistoric and historic Native American, French colonial, and early American after the Revolutionary War.

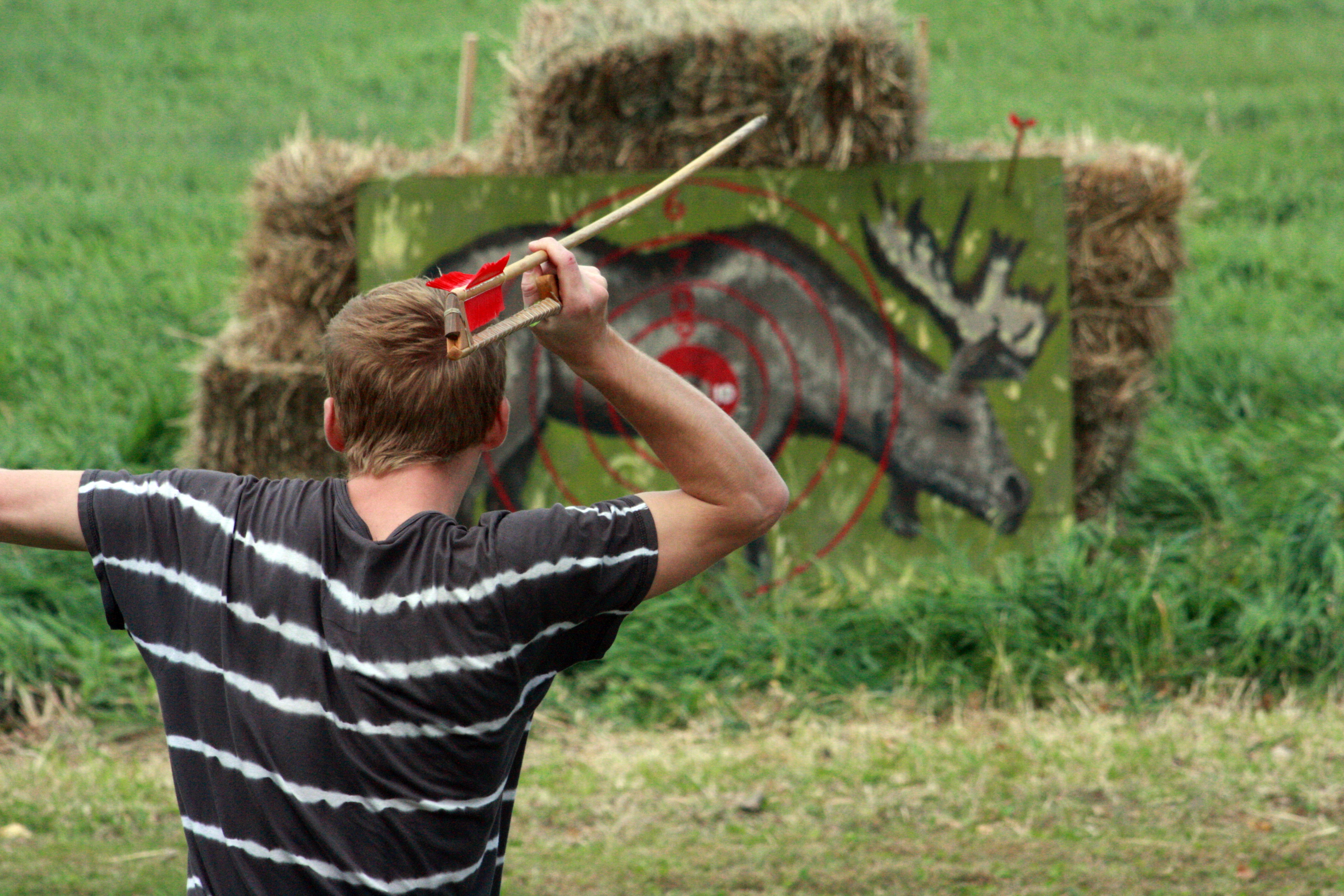
Atlatl competitions are held at Chimney Point

The park hosts the annual Northeast Open Atlatl Championship and workshops on Native American techniques of atlatl and dart construction, flint knapping, hafting stone points, and cordage making.

Chimney Point Historic Site and Crown Point State Historic Site across the lake in New York cooperate closely on promoting the historic significance of the area and often jointly sponsor events. Visitors can walk across the Lake Champlain Bridge from one site to the other.

The museum at the Chimney Point Historic Site is open from late May through Columbus Day.

== See also ==
- National Register of Historic Places listings in Addison County, Vermont
