= Addison, Vermont =

- Town
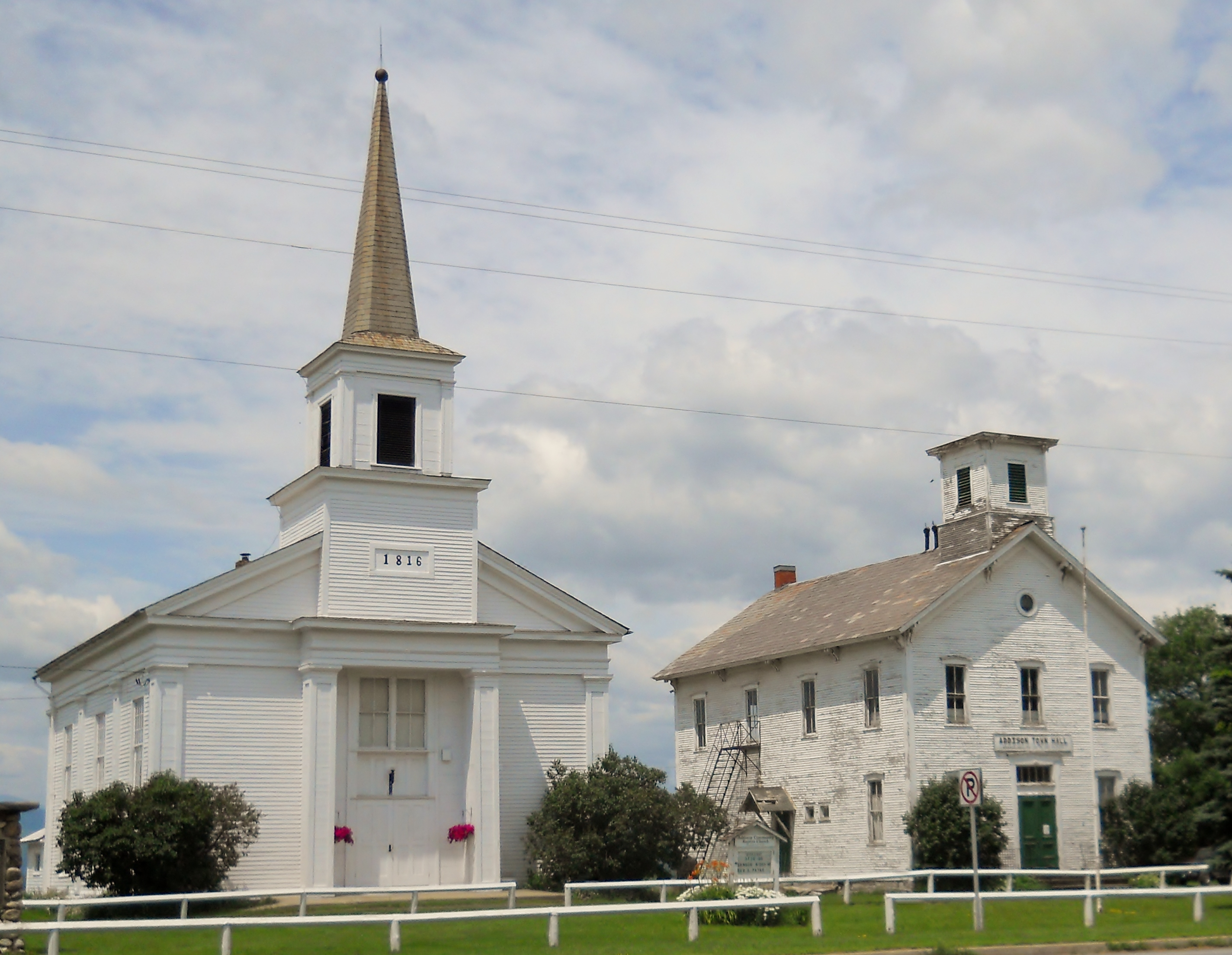
- The Addison Community Baptist Church and Addison Town Hall located at Addison Four Corners.

- Seal

- Location in Addison County and the state of Vermont
- Coordinates: 44°04′16″N 73°20′15″W
- Country: United States
- State: Vermont
- County: Addison
- Communities: Addison; Chimney Point; West Addison

Area
  - Total: 49.0 sq mi (126.8 km^{2})
  - Land: 41.7 sq mi (108.1 km^{2})
  - Water: 7.3 sq mi (18.8 km^{2})
- Elevation: 102 ft (31 m)

Population (2020)
  - Total: 1,365
  - Density: 33/sq mi (12.6/km^{2})
- Time zone: UTC−5 (Eastern (EST))
  - Summer (DST): UTC−4 (EDT)
- ZIP Code: 05491
- Area code: 802
- FIPS code: 50-00325
- GNIS feature ID: 1462023
- Website: https://addisonvt.gov/

Addison is a town in Addison County, Vermont, United States. As of the 2020 census, its population was 1,365.

== History ==
Addison was chartered on October 14, 1761. Benning Wentworth named the town Addison after poet Joseph Addison.

== Geography ==
According to the United States Census Bureau, the town has a total area of 49.0 square miles (126.8 km^{2}), of which 41.7 square miles (108.1 km^{2}) is land and 7.2 square miles (18.8 km^{2}) (14.81%) is water. The Dead Creek and the Hospital Creek run through Addison, and Lake Champlain is on the west border of Addison. The highest point is Snake Mountain, which is 1281 ft above Lake Champlain.

=== Highways ===
- Vermont Route 17
- Vermont Route 22A
- Vermont Route 23
- Vermont Route 125

== Demographics ==
Historical population
Census	Pop.	Note	%±
1790	401		—
1800	734		83.0%
1810	1,100		49.9%
1820	1,210		10.0%
1830	1,306		7.9%
1840	1,229		−5.9%
1850	1,279		4.1%
1860	1,000		−21.8%
1870	911		−8.9%
1880	847		−7.0%
1890	900		6.3%
1900	851		−5.4%
1910	796		−6.5%
1920	743		−6.7%
1930	684		−7.9%
1940	576		−15.8%
1950	628		9.0%
1960	645		2.7%
1970	717		11.2%
1980	889		24.0%
1990	1,023		15.1%
2000	1,393		36.2%
2010	1,371		−1.6%
2020	1,365		−0.4%
U.S. Decennial Census

As of the census of 2000, there were 1,393 people, 494 households, and 402 families residing in the town. The population density was 33.4 people per square mile (12.9 people/km^{2}). There were 651 housing units at an average density of 15.6 units per square mile (6.0 units/km^{2}). The racial makeup of the town was 98.42% White, 0.14% African American, 0.22% Native American, 0.36% Asian, 0.14% Pacific Islander, and 0.72% from two or more races. Hispanic or Latino of any race were 0.57% of the population.

There were 494 households, out of which 39.3% had children under the age of 18 living with them, 73.7% were married couples living together, 5.1% had a female householder with no husband present, and 18.6% were non-families. Of all households, 14.2% were made up of individuals, and 5.9% had someone living alone who was 65 years of age or older. The average household size was 2.82 and the average family size was 3.10.

In the town, the population was spread out, with 28.6% under the age of 18, 5.1% from 18 to 24, 29.4% from 25 to 44, 26.6% from 45 to 64, and 10.3% who were 65 years of age or older. The median age was 36 years. For every 100 females, there were 98.7 males. For every 100 females age 18 and over, there were 99.2 males.

The median income for a household in the town was $45,063, and the median income for a family was $48,696. Males had a median income of $31,328 versus $25,602 for females. The per capita income for the town was $18,000. About 2.9% of families and 4.8% of the population were below the poverty line, including 1.5% of those under age 18 and 8.8% of those age 65 or over.

=== 2020 census ===
Addison Town racial composition
Race	Num.	Perc.
White (non-Hispanic)	1,240	90.84%
Black or African American (non-Hispanic)	1	0.15%
Native American	3	0.22%
Asian	6	0.44%
Pacific Islander	0	0
Other/Mixed	51	3.73%
Hispanic or Latino	64	4.69%

== Locations ==
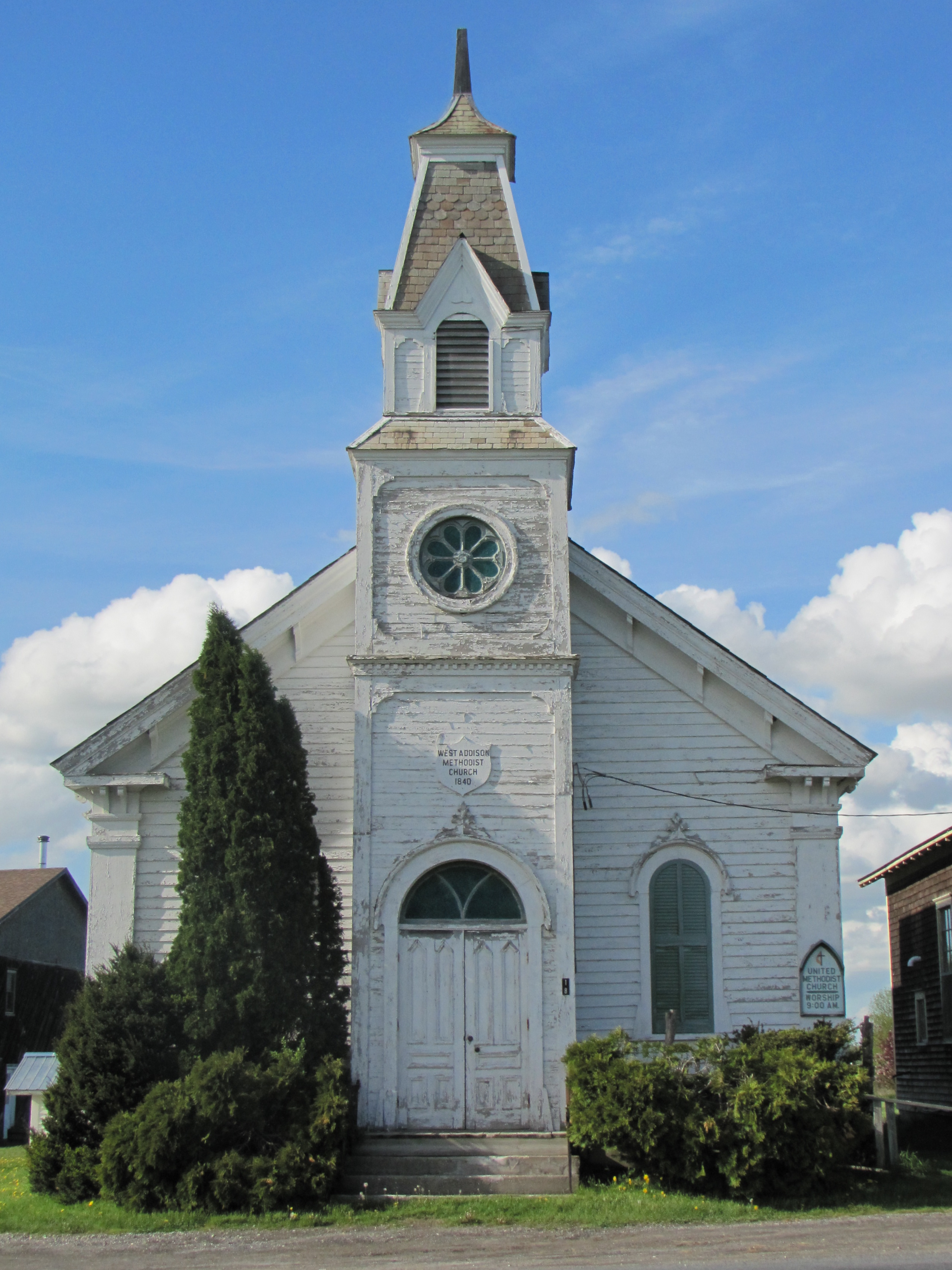
The West Addison Methodist Church is located at the West Addison village center.

- Addison Four Corners – Junction of VT Route 22A and Vermont Route 17 near the east side of the town. The town hall, school, fire department, general store, and Addison Baptist Church are located here.
- Chimney Point – Junction of Route 17 and Route 125 on the shore of Lake Champlain by the Champlain Bridge
- Dead Creek – runs north through the center of the town. Most of the creek is within the Dead Creek Wildlife Management Area with a viewing area on Route 17.
- Lake Champlain – forms Addison's western border with New York
- Otter Creek – a creek that forms Addison's eastern border with Waltham.
- Snake Mountain – a monadnock on Addison's eastern border with Weybridge.
- West Addison – Junction of Church Street and Jersey Street South near Vermont Route 17 on the west side of town.

== Education ==
The town of Addison is part of the Addison North West School District. The town had its own elementary school, known as Addison Central School, serving students from kindergarten to sixth grade at the town center. It was closed in July 2020 with elementary students now attending Vergennes Union Elementary School. Students from seventh to twelfth grade are taught at Vergennes Union High School in Vergennes.

== Notable people ==
- John N, Evans, Wisconsin physician and politician
- Silas G. Pratt, composer
- John Strong, militia officer and Speaker of the Vermont House of Representatives
- Samuel Strong, militia officer and mayor of Vergennes
