= Ironville (disambiguation) =

Ironville is a village in Derbyshire, England. The name may also refer to:

- Ironville, Nova Scotia, Canada
- Ironville, Kentucky, United States
- Ironville Historic District, Essex County, New York, United States
- Ironville, Pennsylvania, United States
