= Fort Saint-Frédéric =

- U.S. National Register of Historic Places
- U.S. National Historic Landmark
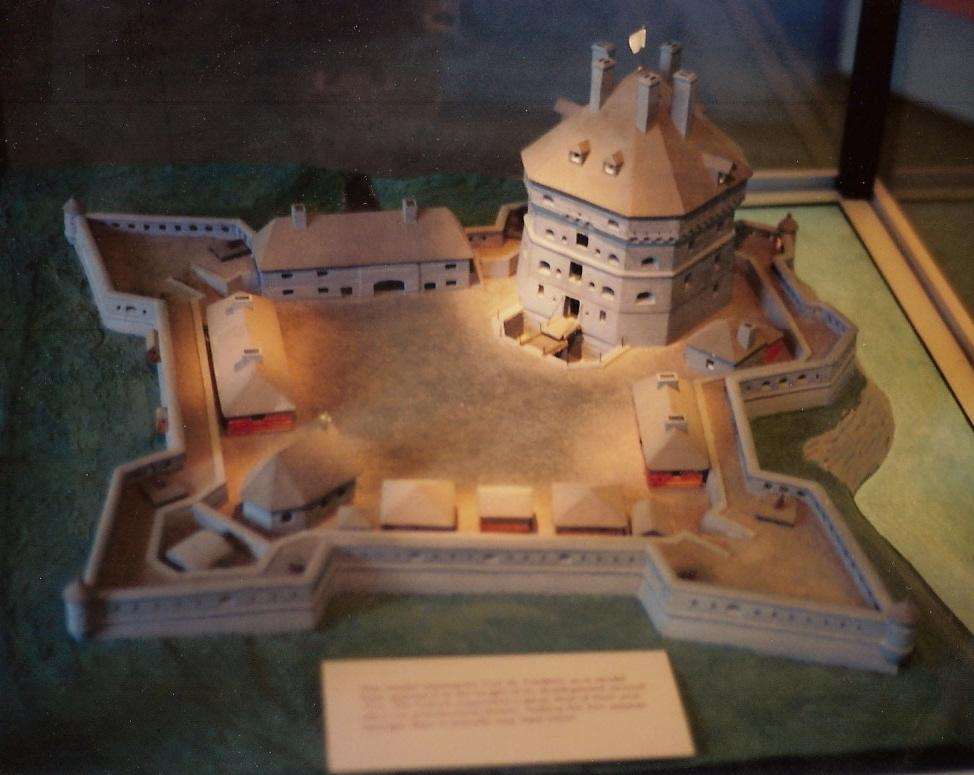
- Model of Fort Saint-Frédéric

- Location within New York Adirondack Park Location within New York
- Location: Crown Point, New York
- Coordinates: 44°1′45″N 73°25′52″W
- Built: 1734
- NRHP reference No.: 66000517

Significant dates
- Added to NRHP: October 15, 1966
- Designated NHL: October 9, 1960

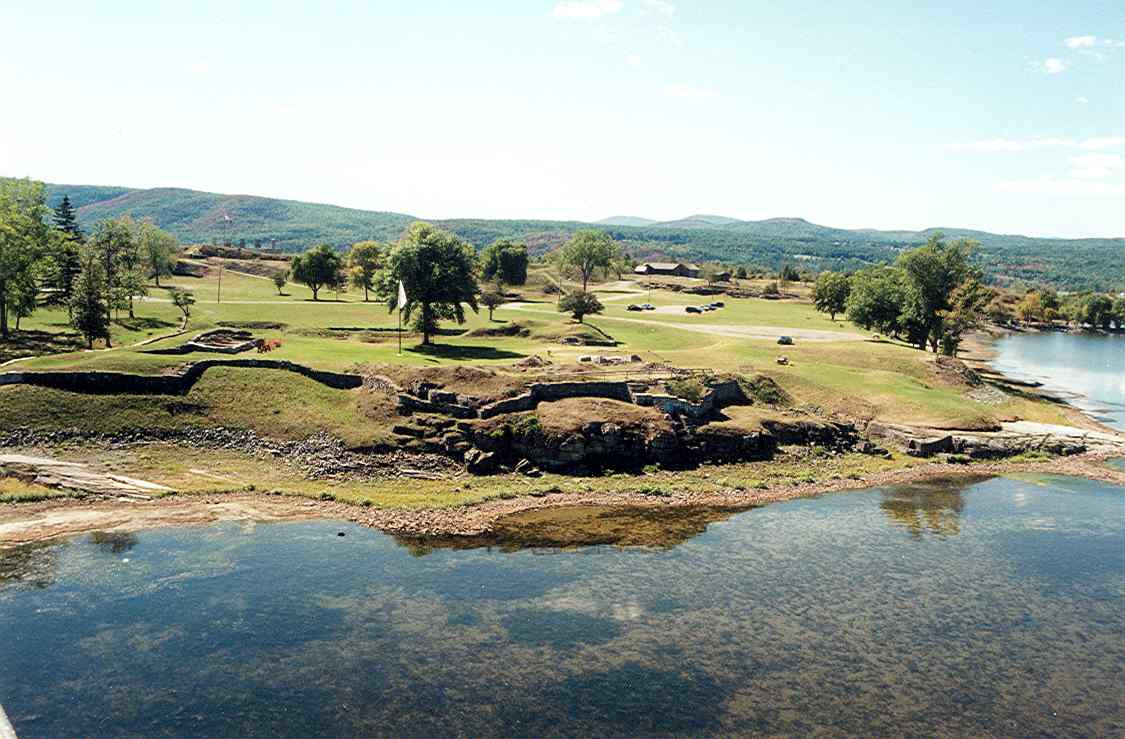
Ruins of Fort Saint Frédéric

Fort Saint-Frédéric was a French fort built on Lake Champlain to secure the region against British colonization and control the lake. It was located in modern New York State across the lake from modern Vermont at the town of Crown Point, New York. The fort, whose construction began in 1734, was never attacked, and was destroyed in 1759 before the advance of a large (more than 10,000 man) British army under General Jeffery Amherst.

The British constructed the much larger Fort Crown Point next to the ruins of Saint-Frédéric; the new fort also never came under attack. Its small garrison was captured in 1775 in the early days of the American Revolutionary War, after which Fort Crown Point also fell into ruin. The fort sites at Crown Point were preserved in the Crown Point State Historic Site in 1910, and both ruins are National Historic Landmarks.

== History ==
Construction was started in 1734 by Gaspard-Joseph Chaussegros de Léry. When complete, Fort Saint-Frédéric walls were twelve feet thick and four stories high, with cannons on each level. It was manned by hundreds of officers and troops, principally from Les Compagnies Franches de la Marine.

The fort gave the French control of the frontier between New France and the British colonies to the south. As the only permanent stronghold in the area until the building of Fort Carillon at Ticonderoga starting in 1755, many French raids originated there and it was a target of British operations in the French and Indian War. Constructed on the tip of a strategic peninsula at a narrows in the lake, the cannons of Fort Saint-Frédéric and the later British Fort Crown Point were capable of halting all north-south travel on the lake.

In 1759 when British forces moved against Fort Saint-Frédéric during the war, the retreating French destroyed it. The British Army and provincial militia then built Fort Crown Point, a vast fortification just southwest of the ruins of the French fort, starting in the fall of 1759. At the same time they built a fleet to gain military control of Lake Champlain and the 77-mile-long Crown Point Road across the Green Mountains to reach the Connecticut River.

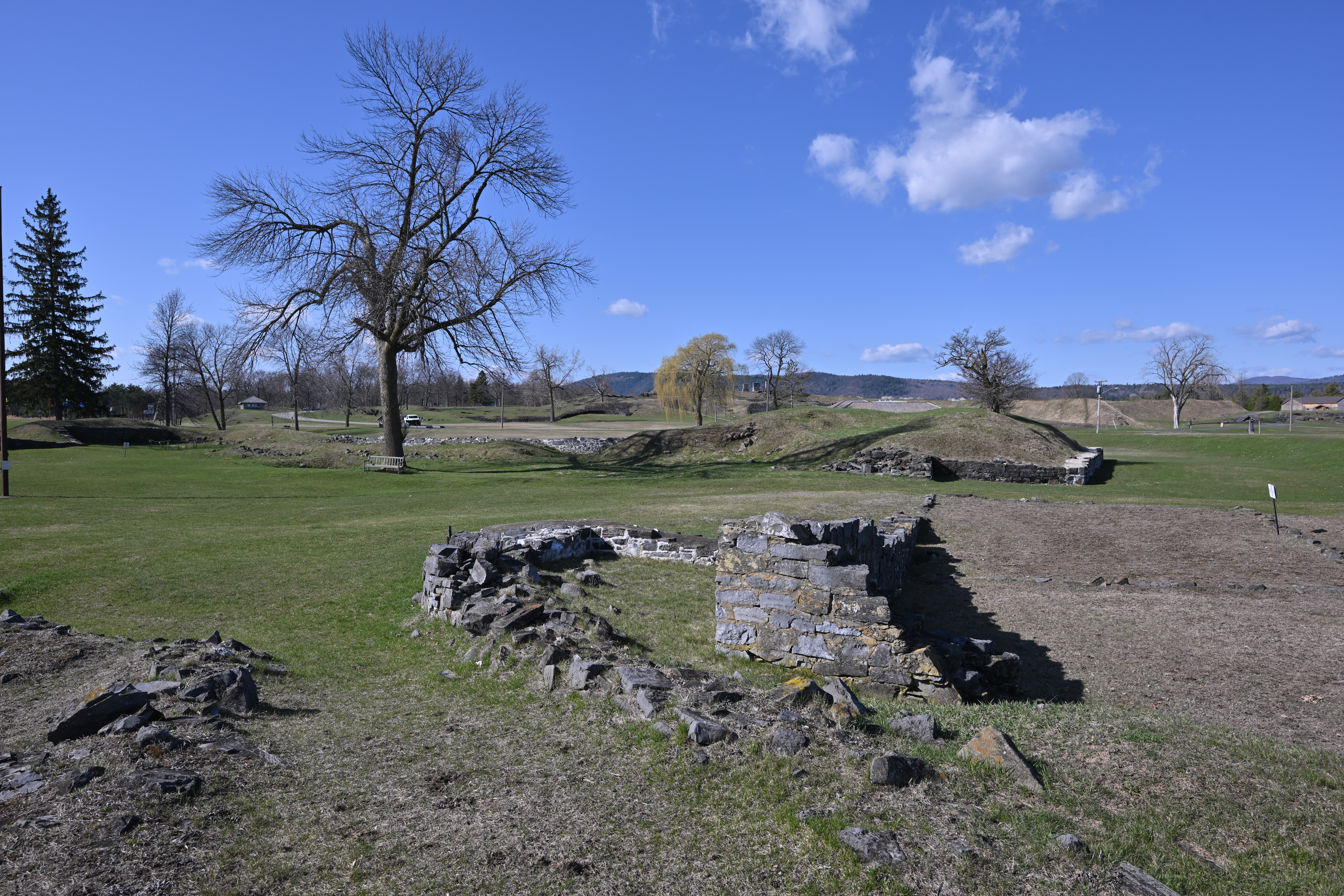
Fort St. Frédéric ruins, Crown Point, NY

Since 1910 the remains of both forts on the Crown Point peninsula are part of the Crown Point State Historic Site. Both are also U.S. National Historic Landmarks. Fort Saint-Frédéric was registered as a National Historic Landmark in 1962.

== See also ==
- Military of New France
- Paul Bécart de Granville
- François-Antoine Pécaudy de Contrecœur
