= Crown Point, New York =

- Town
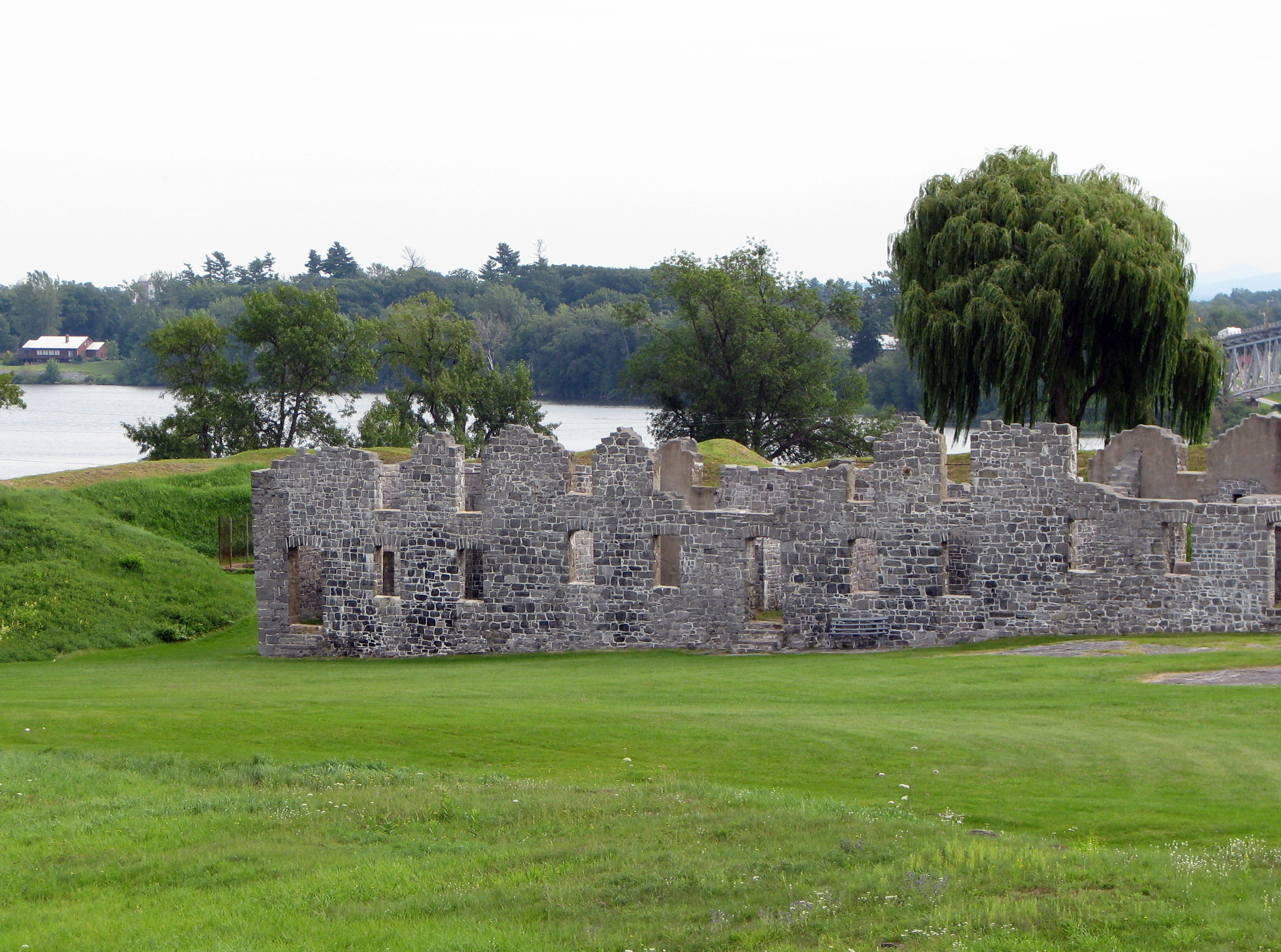
- Ruins of the barracks at Fort Crown Point

- Location in Essex County and the state of New York
- Coordinates: 43°57′1″N 73°29′1″W
- Country: United States
- State: New York
- County: Essex

Government
  - Type: Town Council
  - Town Supervisor: Clayton Menser (R)
  - Town Council: Members' List: • Walter Worth; • Sherlene Barrows; • Roy Cutting; • Tara Peters

Area
  - Total: 81.85 sq mi (211.98 km^{2})
  - Land: 76.12 sq mi (197.16 km^{2})
  - Water: 5.72 sq mi (14.82 km^{2})
- Elevation: 909 ft (277 m)

Population (2020)
  - Total: 2,042
  - Density: 25.4/sq mi (9.81/km^{2})
- Time zone: UTC-5 (Eastern (EST))
  - Summer (DST): UTC-4 (EDT)
- ZIP Codes: 12928 (Crown Point); 12883 (Ticonderoga)
- Area code: 518
- FIPS code: 36-031-19246
- GNIS feature ID: 0978879
- Website: townofcrownpointny.gov

Crown Point is a town in Essex County, New York, United States, located on the west shore of Lake Champlain. The population was 2,042 at the 2020 census, up from 2,024 at the 2010 census. The name of the town is a direct translation of the original French name, Pointe à la Chevelure.

The town is on the eastern edge of Essex County. It is 43 miles (69 km) southwest of Burlington, Vermont, 53 miles (85 km) northeast of Queensbury, 120 miles (190 km) south of Montreal, Quebec and 107 miles (172 km) north of Albany.

== History ==
Two European forts were built by colonists because of the area's strategic location at the narrows of Lake Champlain. The forts preceded organization of the town by more than half a century: first was Fort Saint-Frédéric built by the French in 1734, who came to this area from their colonial settlements to the north at Quebec and Montreal. They competed with the British for the fur trade with Native Americans in the area.

During the Seven Years' War (known as the French and Indian War in North America), the British gained control of this area. Before that, the French retreated and destroyed their fort to keep it out of the hands of the British. The latter built Fort Crown Point in 1759, then the largest earthen fort in their colonies. With British victory in the war, after 1763 France ceded all its territory in North America east of the Mississippi River to Britain.

During colonial times and the American Revolutionary War, the fort at Crown Point continued to be important for its strategic location – on the west shore of Lake Champlain about 15 miles (24 km) north of Fort Ticonderoga, about a day's travel by the modes of that time. After the failure of the patriot American invasion of Canada in 1776, Fort Crown Point represented the northernmost area under American control. During the British Saratoga campaign in 1777, General John Burgoyne organized a supply magazine here to support his Siege of Ticonderoga.

The town of Crown Point, located a few miles south of the 1759 Fort, is an original town of the county, established in 1788 following the Revolution and before the organization of Essex County. Parts of Crown Point were later drawn off to form the town of Elizabethtown (1798). The modern European-American settlement of the town began around 1800 with an influx of settlers from Vermont.

Crown Point holds the New York state January record low of −48 °F (−44 °C).

== Geography ==
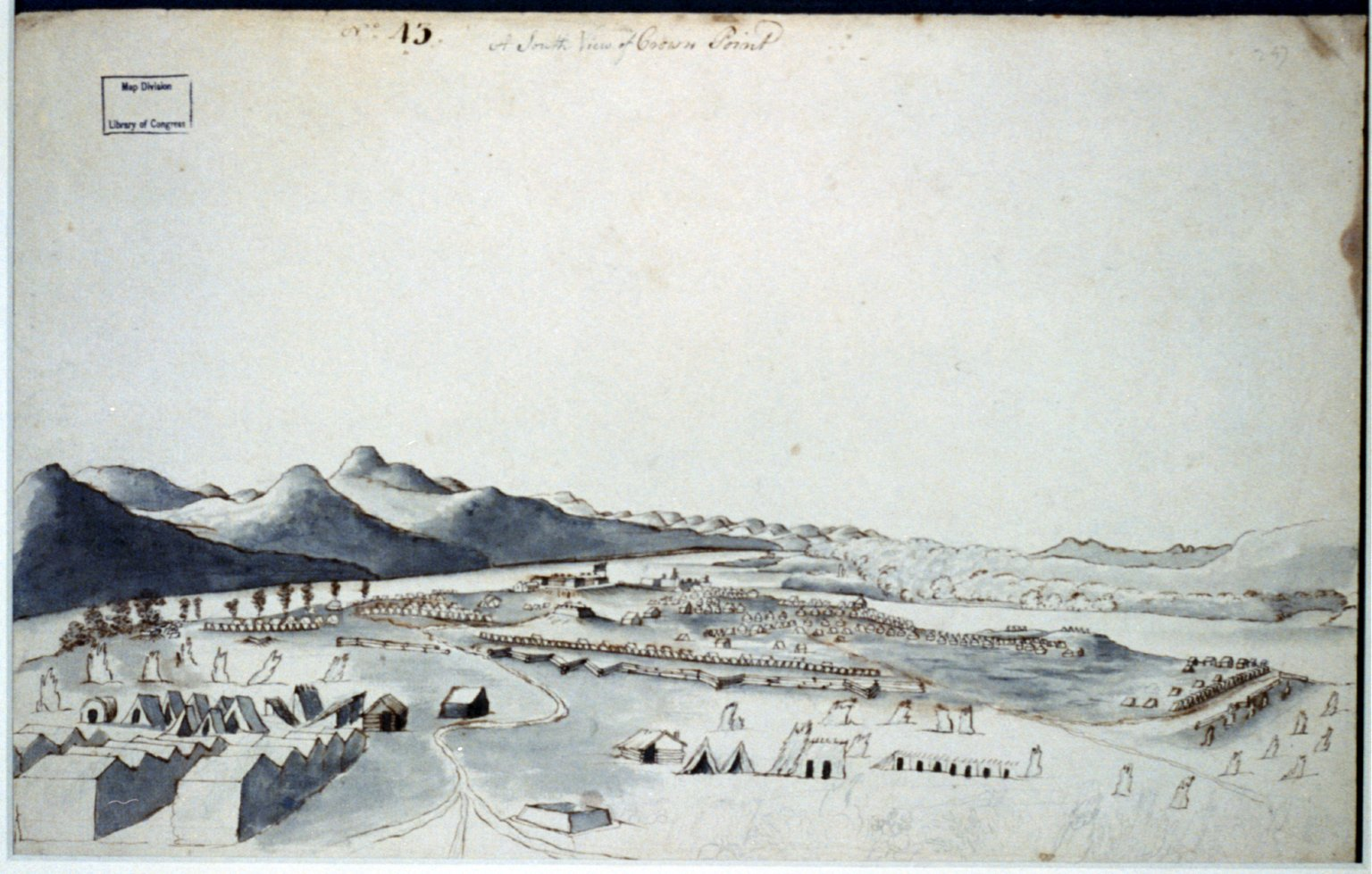
A south view of Crown Point 1760 by Thomas Davies

According to the United States Census Bureau, the town has a total area of 81.9 square miles (212.0 km^{2}), of which 76.1 square miles (197.2 km^{2}) is land and 5.7 square miles (14.8 km^{2}), or 6.99%, is water.

The eastern town line, defined by Lake Champlain, is the border of Vermont (Addison County). The Champlain Bridge (Route 17) connected Crown Point to Vermont until 2009, when the bridge was demolished as unsafe. A temporary ferry service, operated by the Lake Champlain Transportation Company and funded by the states of New York and Vermont, provided access from Crown Point to Vermont from late 2009 until late 2011. The new bridge at Crown Point, scheduled to open in August 2011, opened to traffic that November.

The town of Crown Point lies entirely within the Adirondack Park.

New York State Route 9N, New York State Route 22, and New York State Route 185 are north–south and east–west highways that pass through Crown Point. NY-9N and NY-22 are conjoined through the town. NY-185 runs up the Crown Point peninsula.

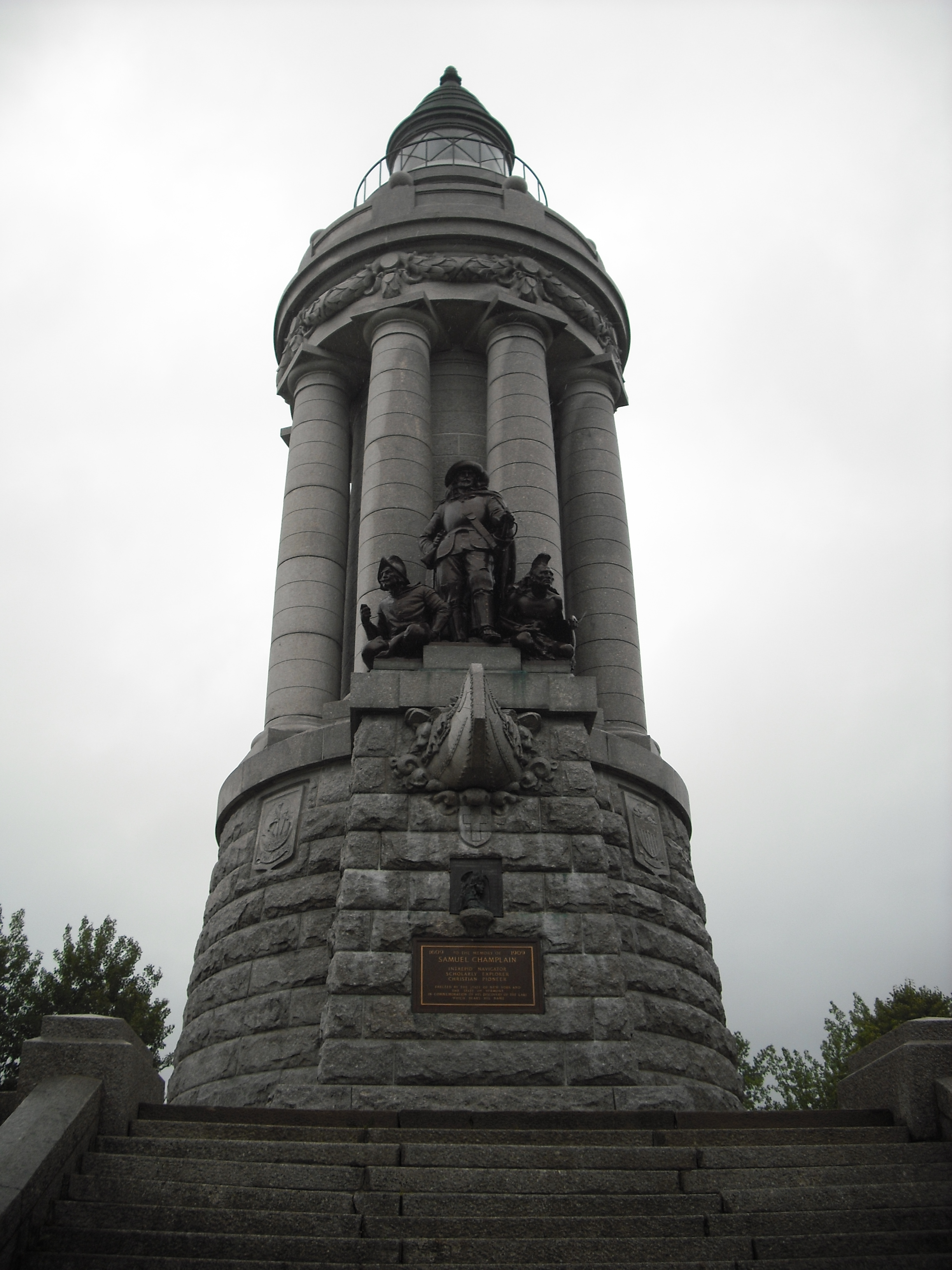
Champlain Lighthouse

== Demographics ==
Historical population
Census	Pop.	Note	%±
1820	1,522		—
1830	2,041		34.1%
1840	2,212		8.4%
1850	2,378		7.5%
1860	2,252		−5.3%
1870	2,449		8.7%
1880	4,287		75.1%
1890	3,135		−26.9%
1900	2,112		−32.6%
1910	1,690		−20.0%
1920	1,413		−16.4%
1930	1,468		3.9%
1940	1,661		13.1%
1950	1,707		2.8%
1960	1,685		−1.3%
1970	1,857		10.2%
1980	1,837		−1.1%
1990	1,963		6.9%
2000	2,119		7.9%
2010	2,024		−4.5%
2020	2,042		0.9%
U.S. Decennial Census

As of the census of 2000, there were 2,119 people, 797 households, and 578 families residing in the town. The population density was 27.8 inhabitants per square mile (10.7/km^{2}). There were 1,063 housing units at an average density of 13.9 per square mile (5.4/km^{2}). The racial makeup of the town was 97.50% White, 0.09% African American, 0.24% Native American, 0.38% Asian, 0.14% from other races, and 1.65% from two or more races. Hispanic or Latino of any race were 0.14% of the population.

There were 797 households, out of which 33.9% had children under the age of 18 living with them, 58.2% were married couples living together, 8.3% had a female householder with no husband present, and 27.4% were non-families. 21.3% of all households were made up of individuals, and 9.8% had someone living alone who was 65 years of age or older. The average household size was 2.64 and the average family size was 3.06.

In the town, the population was spread out, with 28.0% under the age of 18, 6.7% from 18 to 24, 27.0% from 25 to 44, 23.8% from 45 to 64, and 14.4% who were 65 years of age or older. The median age was 38 years. For every 100 females, there were 102.4 males. For every 100 females age 18 and over, there were 102.0 males.

The median income for a household in the town was $33,958, and the median income for a family was $39,853. Males had a median income of $31,106 versus $20,074 for females. The per capita income for the town was $16,692. About 10.8% of families and 14.6% of the population were below the poverty line, including 20.9% of those under age 18 and 9.6% of those age 65 or over.

== Communities and locations in Crown Point ==
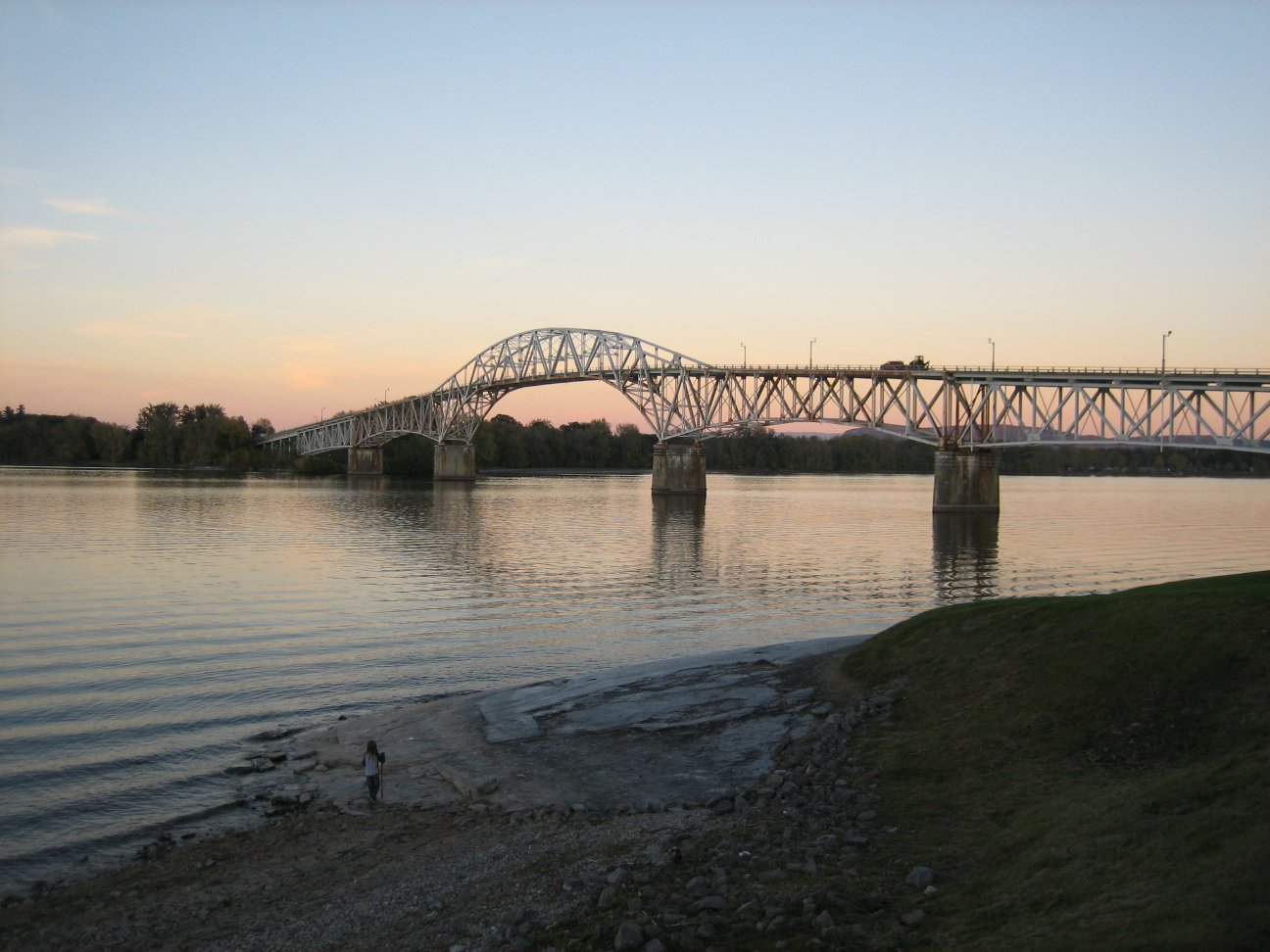
The former bridge at Crown Point

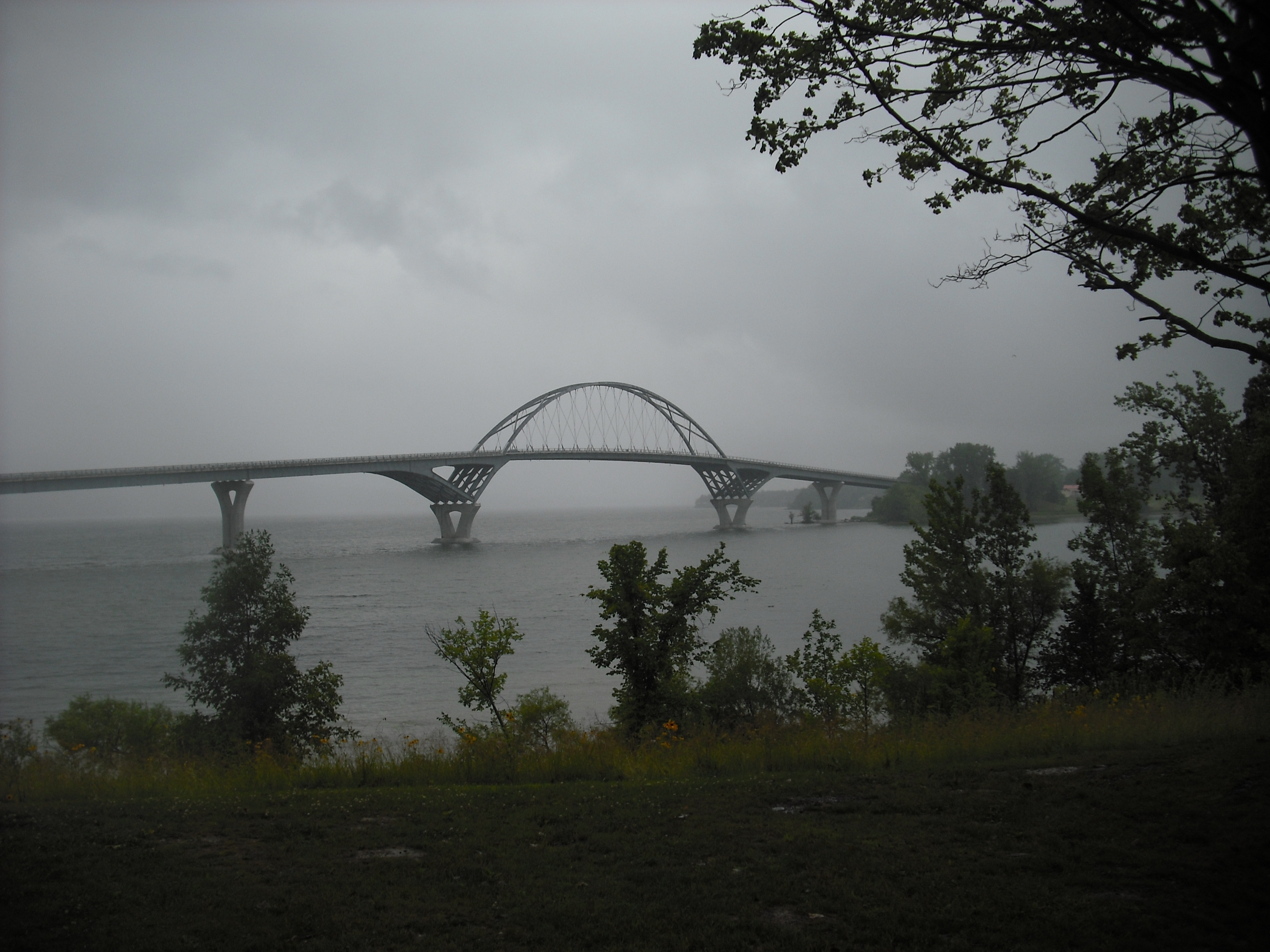
2011 Champlain Bridge

- Bulwagga Bay – A bay between Crown Point peninsula and the mainland of the county.
- Burdick Crossing – A hamlet in the northeastern part of the town, near the south end of Crown Point on County Road 48.
- Cold Spring Park – A hamlet in the northeastern section of the town, on County Road 7.
- Crown Point – The hamlet of Crown Point is in the eastern part of the town on Routes NY-9N and NY-22. Crown Point Green Historic District was added to the National Register of Historic Places in 2015.
- Crown Point – A peninsula at the southern end of Lake Champlain and the site of some historic fortifications.
- Crown Point Center – A hamlet west of Factoryville at the junction of County Roads 2 and 7.
- Crown Point State Historic Site – A state park/historical site at the northern tip of Crown Point peninsula.
- Eagle Lake – A lake partly in the southwestern part of the town.
- Factoryville – A hamlet west of Crown Point village.
- Ironville – A hamlet in the southern part of the town, on County Road 2 at the northern end of Penfield Pond. It is the location of the Ironville Historic District.
- Penfield Pond – A lake partly inside Crown Point at the southern town line.
- Putts Creek Wildlife Management Area – A conservation area north of Crown Point village.

== Gallery ==
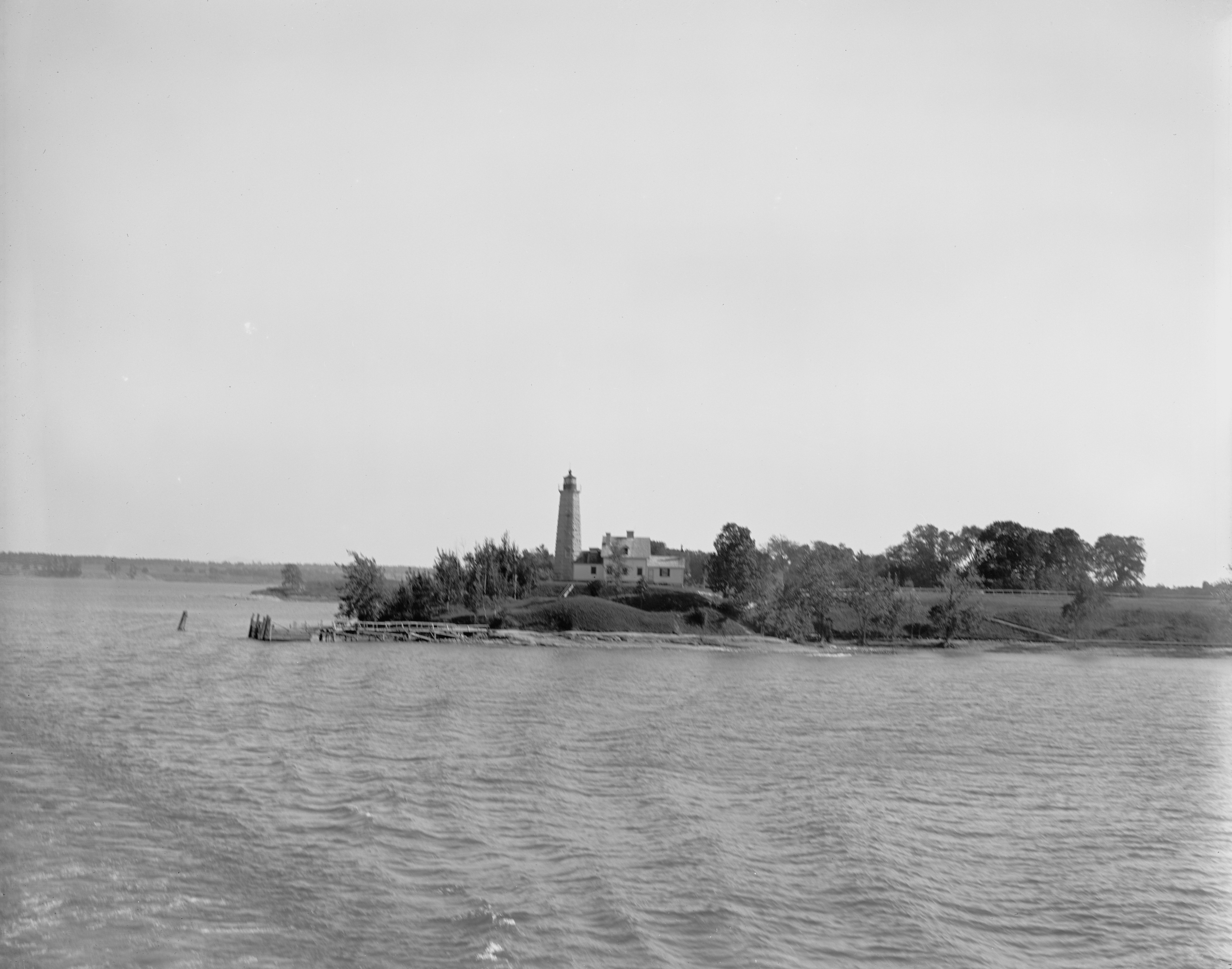
Lake Champlain, Crown Point Light between 1890 and 1910

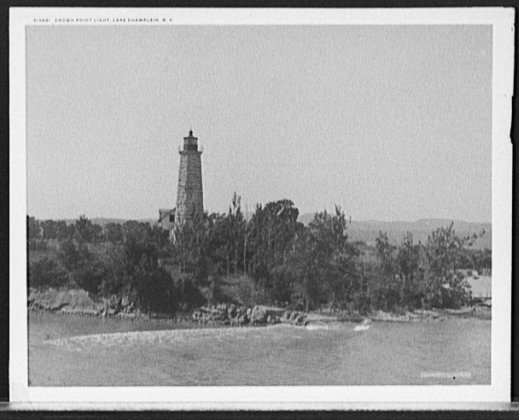
Crown Point Light, Lake Champlain, circa 1907

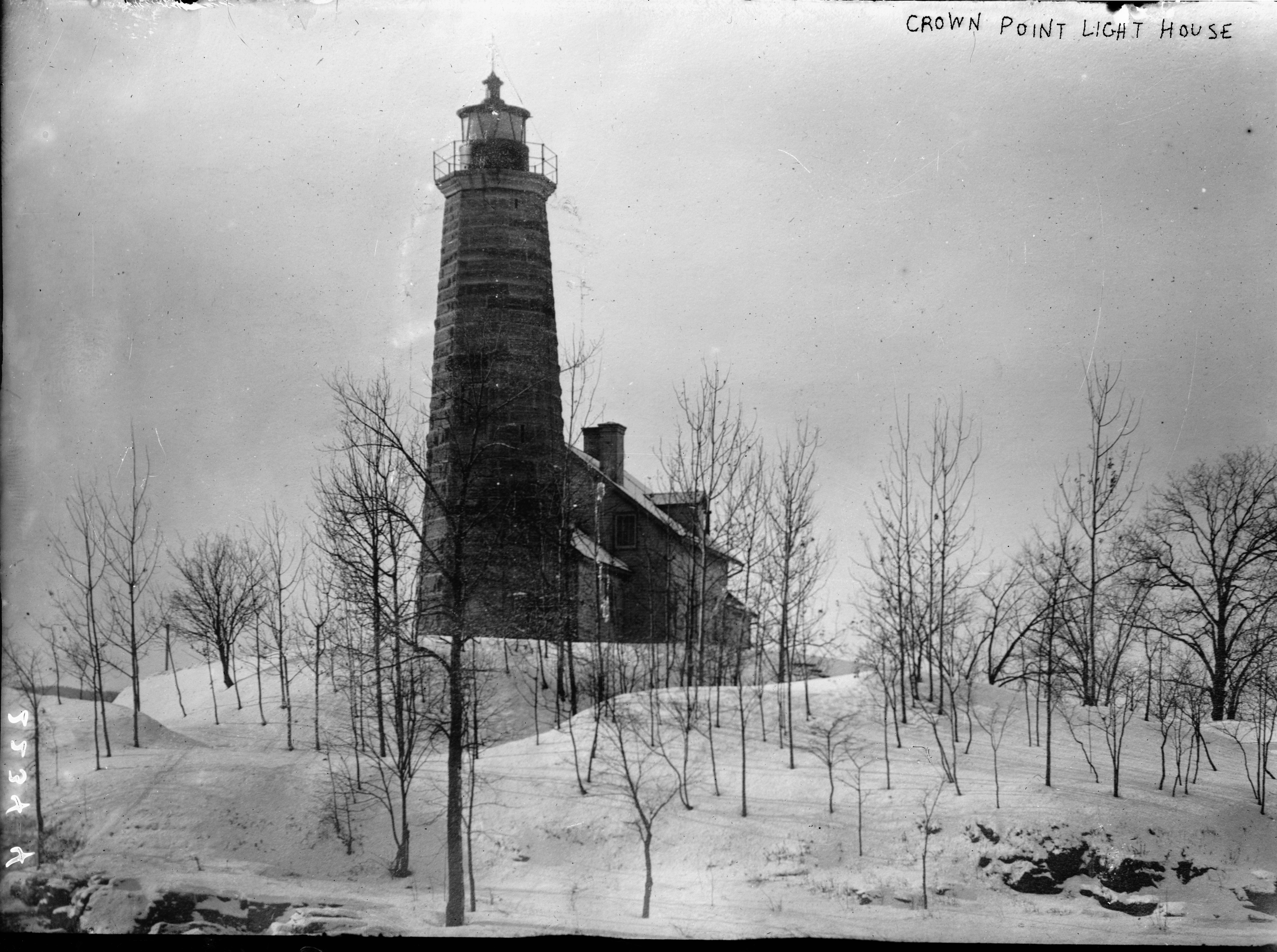
Crown Point Light House

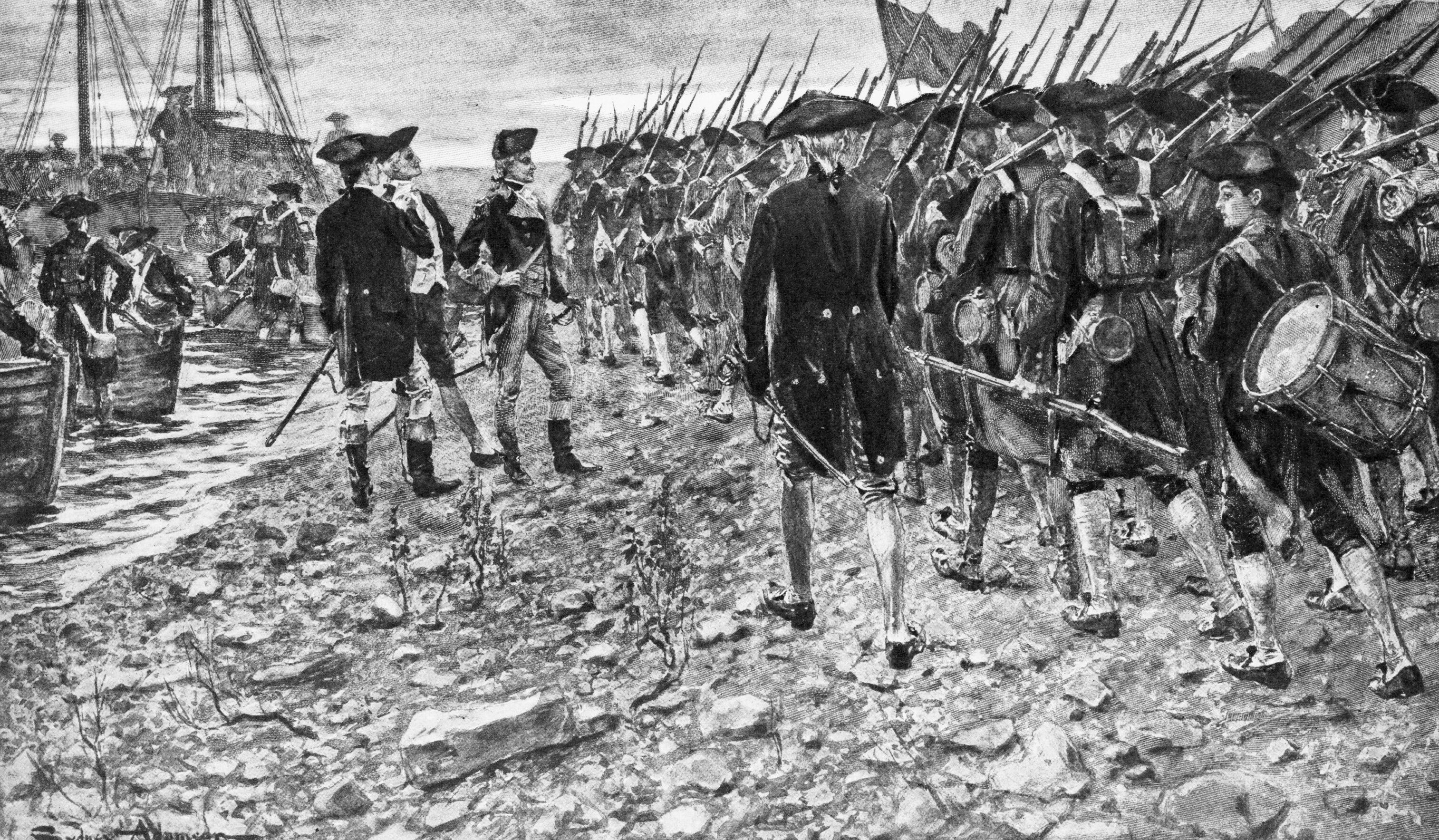
The Embarkation of Montgomery's Troops at Crown Point. Richard Montgomery and troops on shore at Crown Point, New York, en route for the invasion of Quebec. Drawn by Sydney Adamson. Half-tone plate engraved by J.W. Evans. Printed 1902.

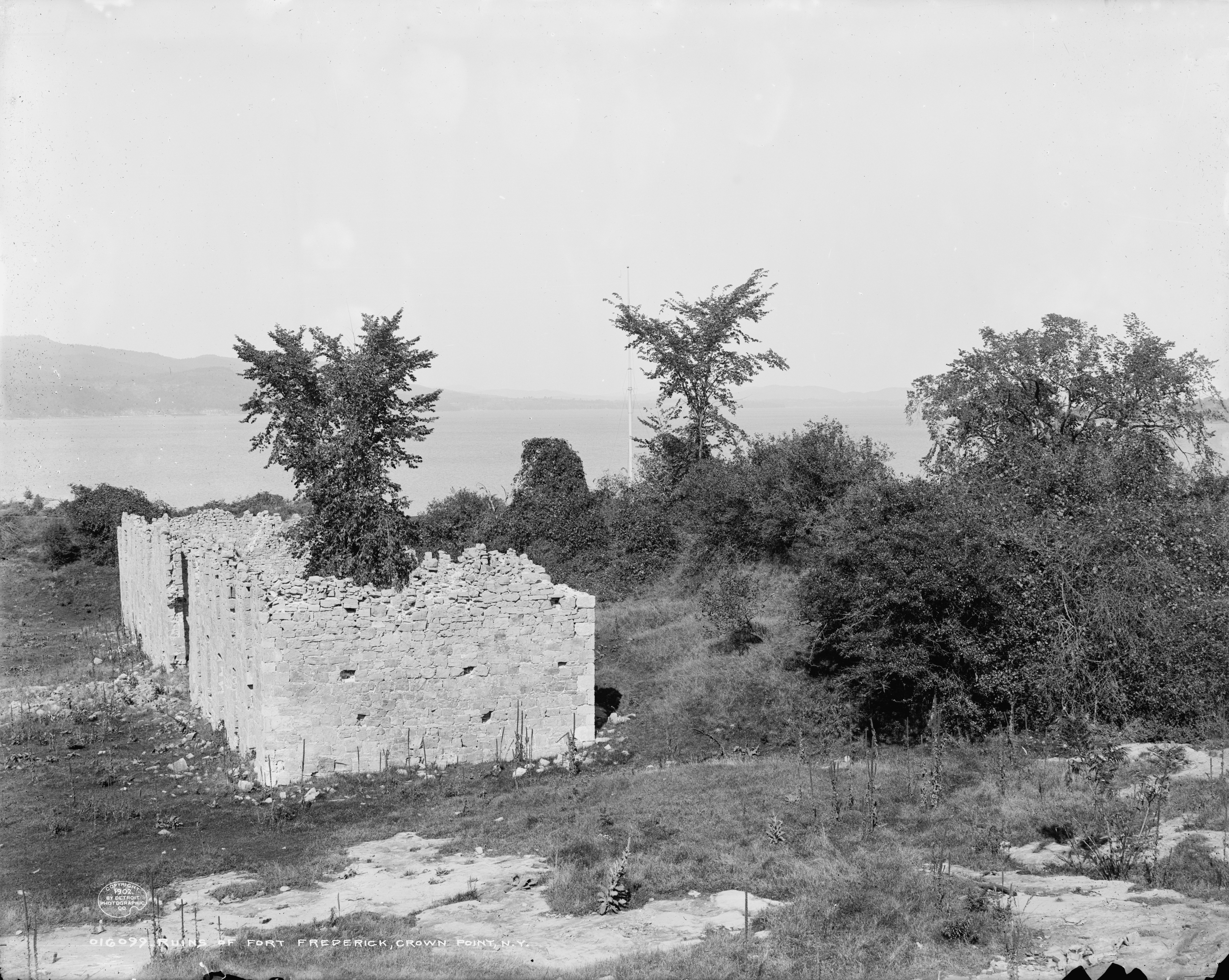
Ruins of Fort Crown Point, circa 1902

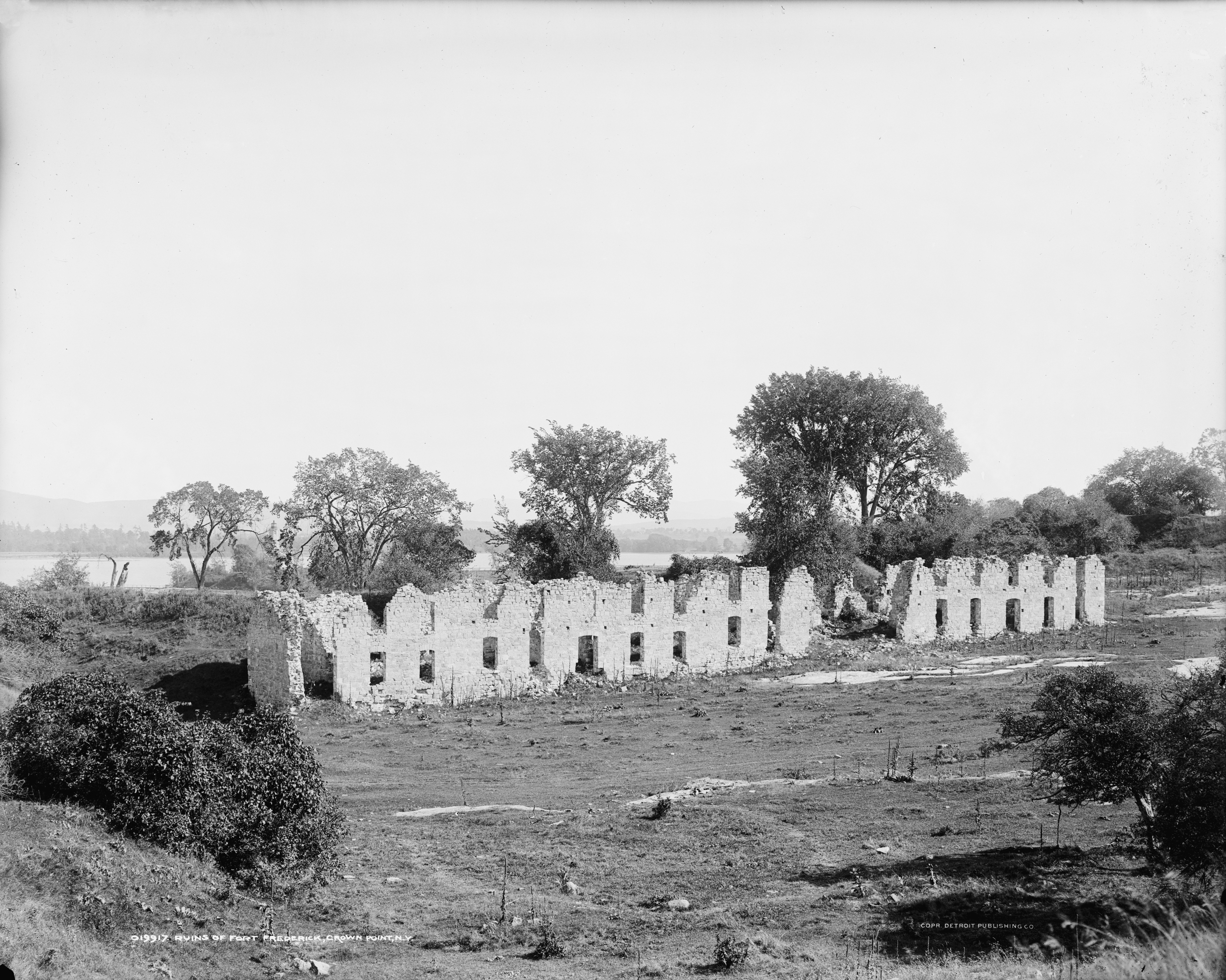
Ruins of Fort Crown Point, circa 1907

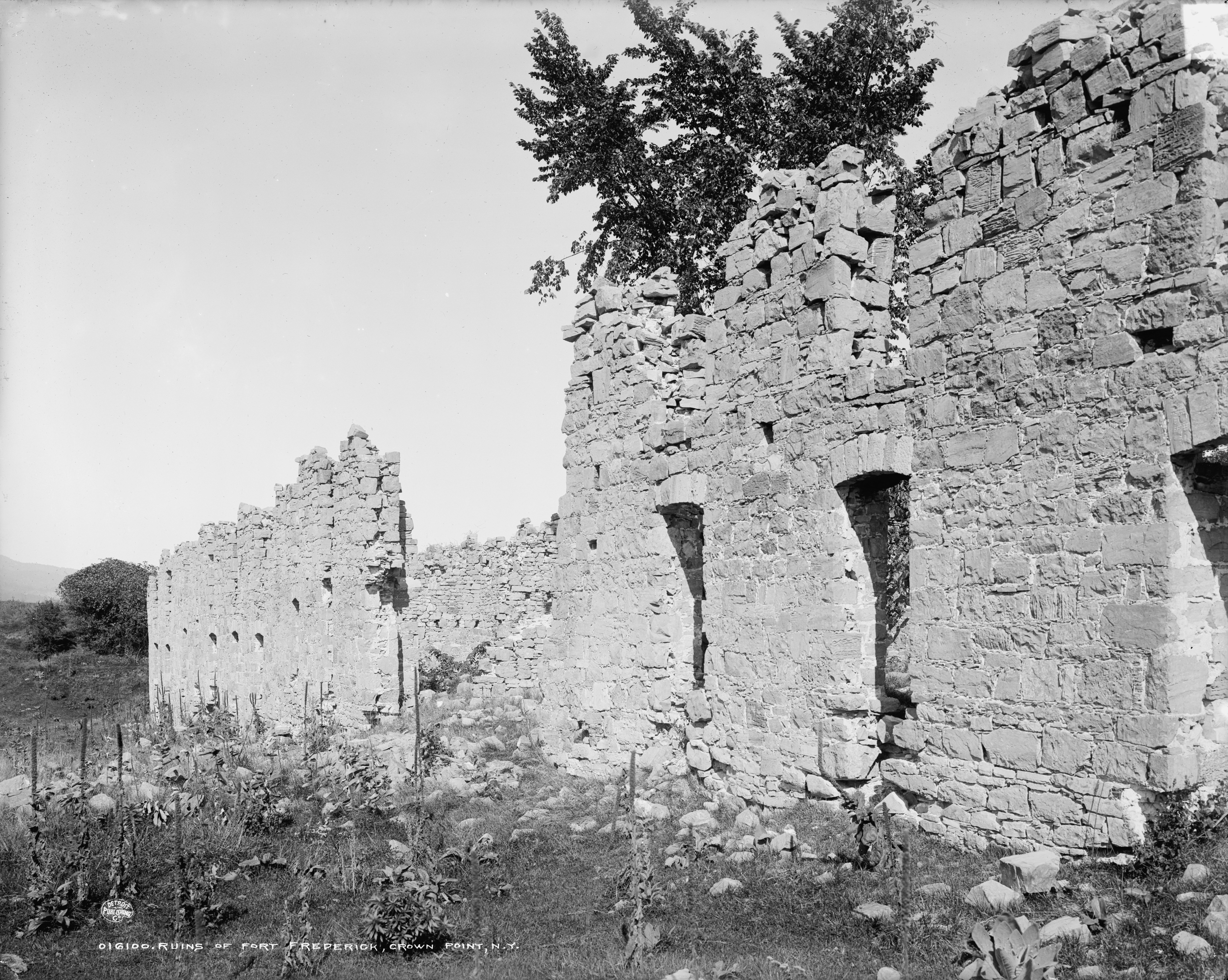
Ruins of Fort Crown Point, between 1900 and 1906

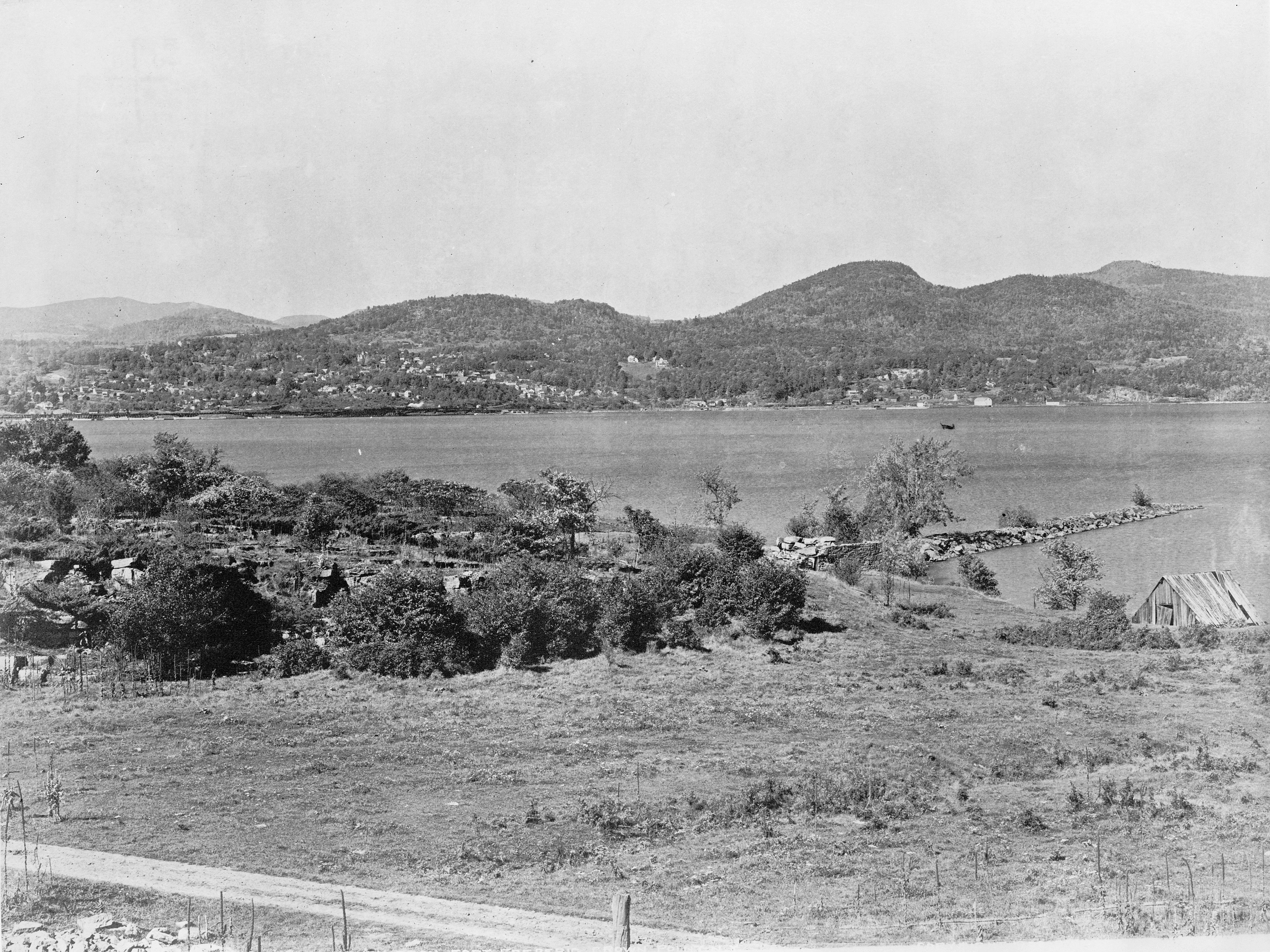
Port Henry from Fort St. Frédéric, Crown Point. Photograph shows view across Lake Champlain at hills in the distance on December 23, 1902.

== Notable residents ==
- Kelly Tabor, novelist and filmmaker.

== See also ==
- Fort Crown Point
- Fort Saint-Frédéric
- Fort Ticonderoga
