= Crown Point State Historic Site =

Historic site in New York, US

Coordinates: 44.0287°N 73.4295°W

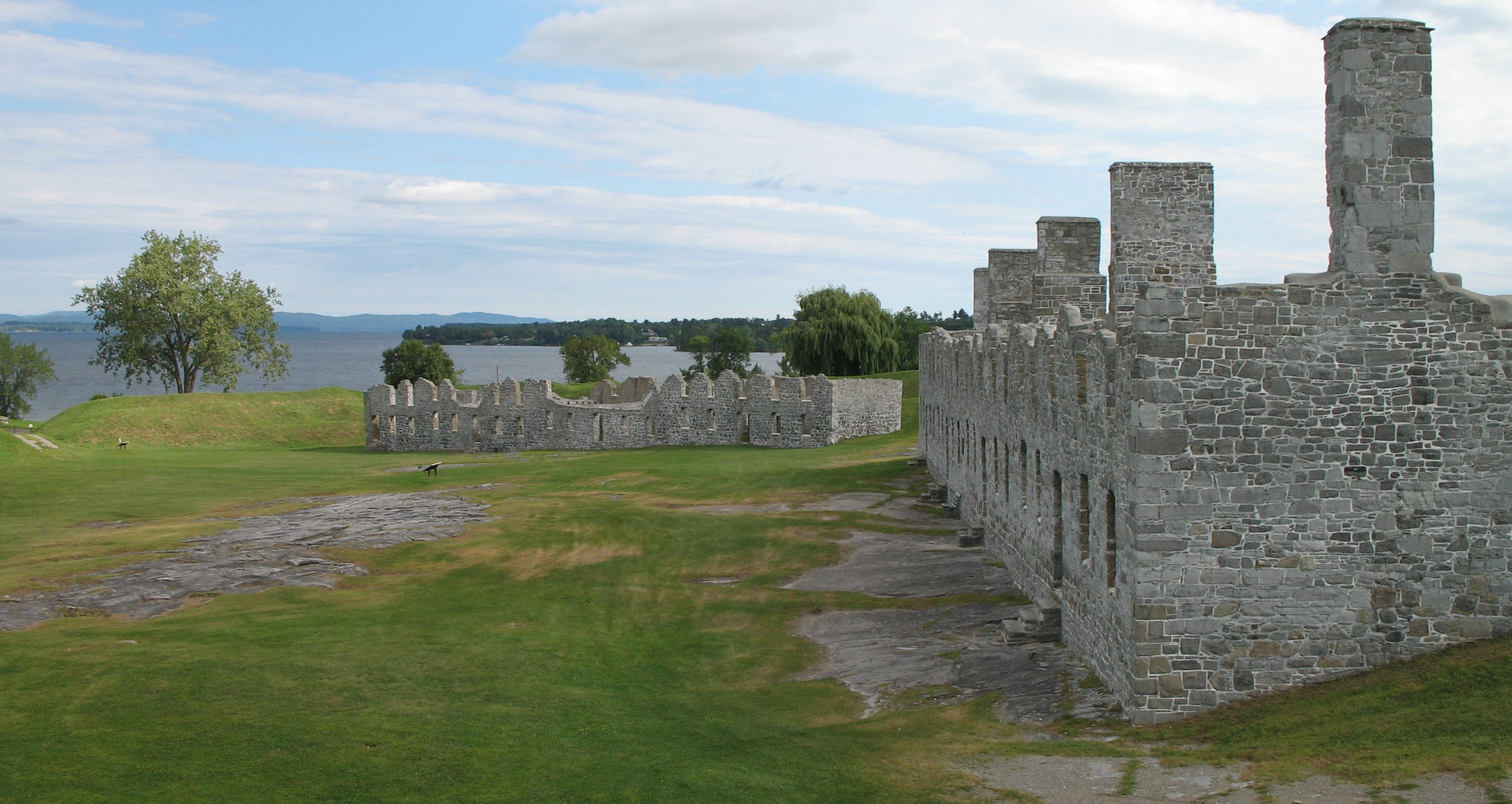
Ruins of Fort Crown Point

Crown Point State Historic Site is the site of a former military stronghold at the south end of the wider part of Lake Champlain. The location is in Essex County, New York, United States. The site is on a peninsula in the town of Crown Point, New York.

Crown Point is the location of the 1734–1759 French-built Fort St. Frédéric limestone fortress and an even more ambitious British fort constructed during the French and Indian War, starting in 1759, Fort Crown Point. During the American Revolutionary War, the fort was captured by Seth Warner and his Green Mountain Boys militia on May 12, 1775, but was re-taken by the British invasion under General John Burgoyne early in the summer of 1777.

Once at the front line of the New World clash between two colonizing European nations, the two forts' ruins remain and are operated as a historic attraction by the State of New York.

== History ==
=== Fort St. Frédéric ===
Construction started in 1734. When complete, Fort Saint-Frédéric walls were twelve feet thick and four stories high, with cannons on each level. It was manned by hundreds of officers and troops, principally from Les Compagnies Franches de la Marine.

The fort gave the French control of the frontier between New France and the British colonies to the south. As the only permanent stronghold in the area until the building of Fort Carillon at Ticonderoga starting in 1755, many French raids originated there and it was a target of British operations in the French and Indian War. Constructed on the tip of a strategic peninsula at a narrows in the lake, the cannons of Fort Saint-Frédéric and the later British Fort Crown Point were capable of halting all north–south travel on the lake. In 1759, when British forces moved against Fort Saint-Frédéric during the war, the retreating French destroyed it.

=== Fort Crown Point ===
Rather than rehabilitate the ruins of the French fort, General Amherst embarked on the construction of an enormous earthen fort. The Crown Point fort was constructed by his following the capture of Fort Carillon, a French fort to the south (which he renamed Fort Ticonderoga), and the destruction of Fort St. Frédéric. Amherst used the construction of the fort as a means of keeping his men working through the winter of 1759 after pushing the French into modern Canada. The Fort was never directly assaulted. Mostly built after the threat of French invasion had ended, it was used largely for staging rather than as a position in its own right.

After the French and Indian War the British left only a skeletal force at the Fort, which yielded easily to Capt. Seth Warner and 100 Green Mountain Boys, an American militia, on May 12, 1775, in the battle of Crown Point at the start of the American Revolutionary War. The 111 cannons captured from the British at Crown Point proved valuable in driving the British out of Boston. The fort was used as a staging ground by Benedict Arnold during the war for his navy on Lake Champlain. After the destruction of that navy in 1776 in the Battle of Valcour Island, the fort was abandoned to the British in 1777. It was abandoned for good in 1780.

The large earthen walls of the fort are still visible today. A massive, accidental fire in April 1773 entirely destroyed the log and earth fortress, leaving the empty stone ruins of two barracks buildings standing. These ruins still stand and are being carefully preserved.

== Today ==
The historic site was established in 1910 to preserve the ruins of the two forts. Both fort ruins are listed as U.S. National Historic Landmarks. Fort Saint-Frédéric was registered as a National Historic Landmark in 1962.

The park's facilities and services include a picnic area, scenic views, hiking, a museum, history interpreters in replica clothing, and educational services.

== See also ==
- List of New York state parks
