= Crown Point Green Historic District =

Historic district in New York, United States

- U.S. National Register of Historic Places
- U.S. Historic district
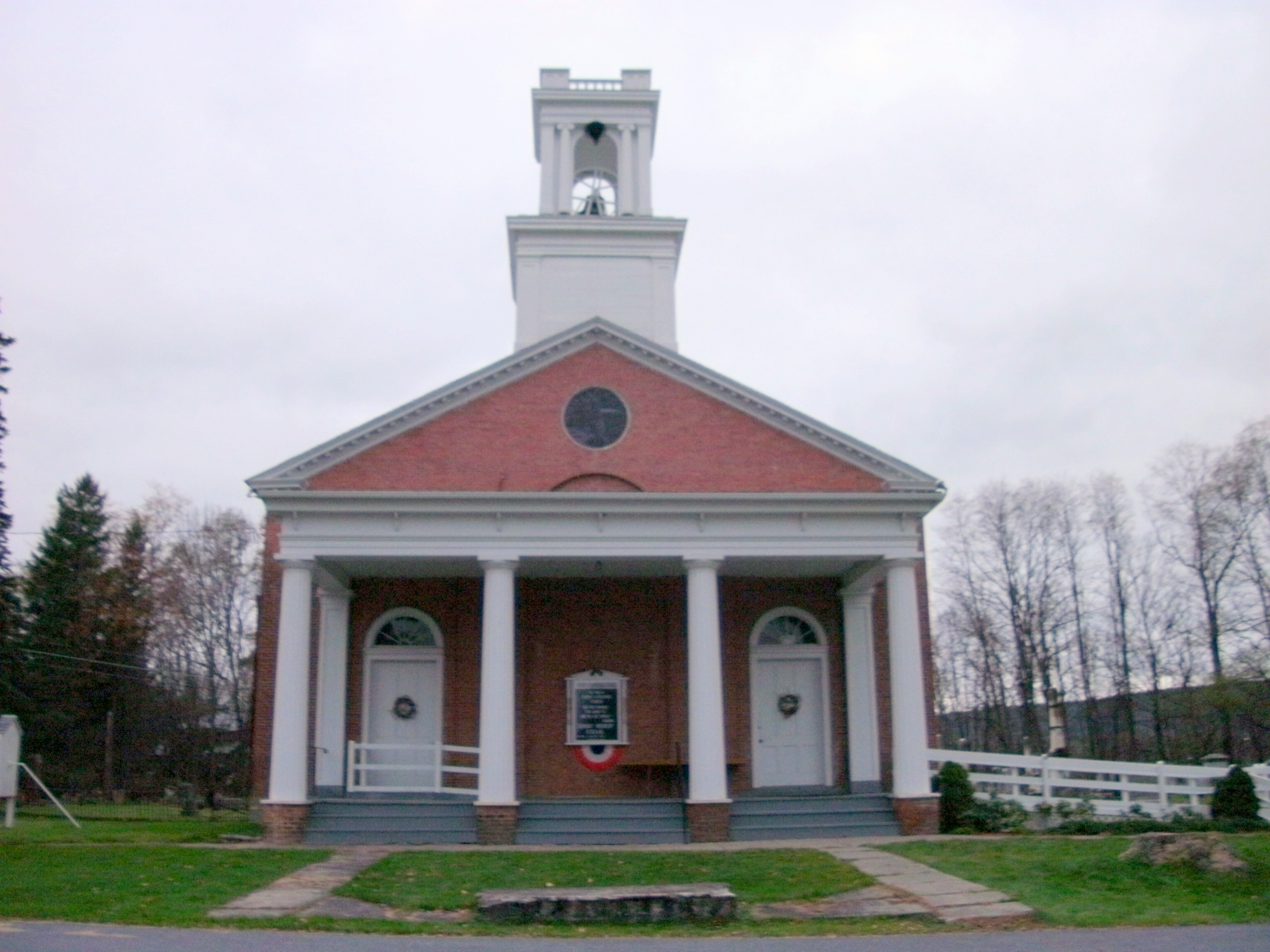
- First Congregational Church, November 2010

- Location within New York Location within the United States
- Location: Park Ave., Creek Rd., NY 9N/22, Crown Point, New York
- Coordinates: 44°57′07″N 73°25′59″W
- Area: 12.67 acres (5.13 ha)
- Built: c. 1800-1930
- Architectural style: Federal, Greek Revival, Italianate, Bungalow/Craftsman
- NRHP reference No.: 15000231
- Added to NRHP: May 18, 2015

Crown Point Green Historic District is a national historic district located at Crown Point, Essex County, New York. It encompasses 13 contributing buildings, 3 contributing sites, and 1 contributing structure centered on Crown Point hamlet's green and the domestic, religious, commercial and civic properties adjacent to it. It developed between about 1800 and 1930, and includes notable examples of Federal, Greek Revival, Italianate, and Bungalow / American Craftsman style architecture. Notable contributing resources include the Crown Point Green, Colonel Job Howe House (c. 1827), the First Congregational Church (c. 1834), the Charles F. Hammond House (c. 1837, Hammond Chapel), The Knapp Senior Center/Masonic Hall (c. 1826), and The Old Brick Store (1827).

It was added to the National Register of Historic Places in 2015.
