= Fort Crown Point =

- U.S. National Register of Historic Places
- U.S. National Historic Landmark District
- New York State Register of Historic Places
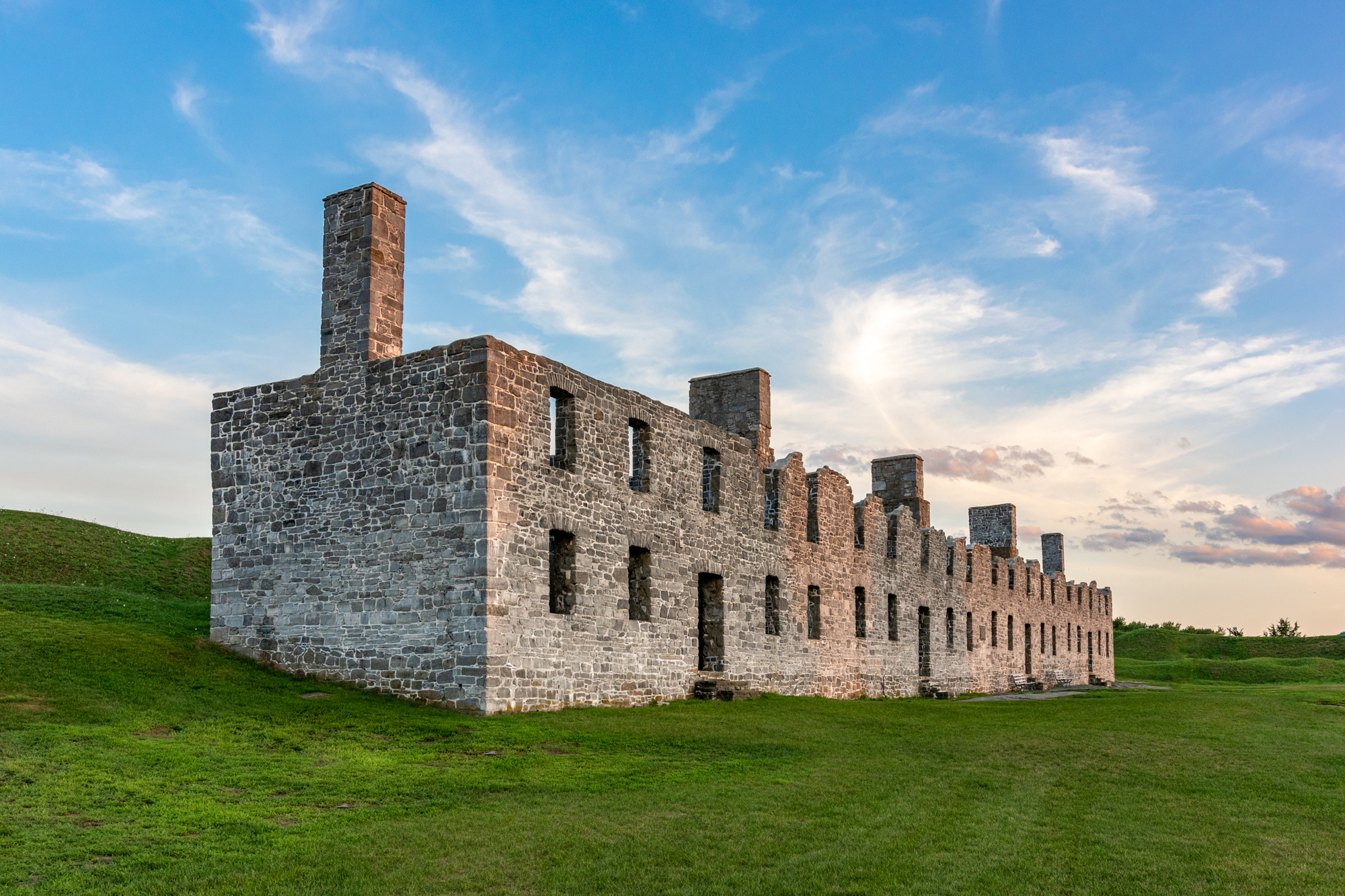
- Ruins of the fort's barracks, 2020

- Location within New York Adirondack Park Location within New York Location within the United States
- Location: Crown Point, New York, NY
- Coordinates: 44°01′45″N 73°25′52″W
- Area: 11,800 acres (4,800 ha)
- Built: 1759
- NRHP reference No.: 68000033
- NYSRHP No.: 03102.000305

Significant dates
- Added to NRHP: November 24, 1968
- Designated NHLD: November 24, 1968
- Designated NYSRHP: June 23, 1980

Fort Crown Point was built by the combined efforts of British and Colonial troops from New York and the New England Colonies in 1759 at a narrows on Lake Champlain on the border between New York and Vermont. It was constructed to secure the region against the French in upstate New York near the town of Crown Point, and it was the largest earthen fortress built in the American colonies. The fort's ruins are a National Historic Landmark administered as part of Crown Point State Historic Site.

== History ==
The French built a fortress at Crown Point in the 1730s with 12-foot (3.7 m) thick limestone walls named Fort Saint-Frédéric. British forces targeted it twice during the French and Indian War before the French destroyed it in the summer of 1759.

The Crown Point fort was constructed by the British army under the command of Sir Jeffery Amherst following the capture of Carillon, a French fort to the south which he renamed Ticonderoga. Amherst used the construction of the fort as a means of keeping his men working through the winter of 1759 after pushing the French into Canada. Israel Putnam supervised much of the construction and became a general in the American Revolutionary War. According to archaeologist David R. Starbuck, Crown Point was "the greatest British military installation ever raised in North America".

The fort was never directly assaulted. It was completed after the threat of French invasion had ended and was used largely for staging rather than as a military position. On April 21, 1773, a chimney fire broke out in the soldier's barracks. It quickly spread, burning for days. In May 1774, British military engineer John Montresor described the fort after the fire: "the conflagration of the late fort has rendered it an amazing useless mass of earth only". Montresor proposed expanding and improving one of the outworks rather than attempting to repair the main fort.

After the French and Indian War, the British left a skeletal force at the fort. They quickly yielded to Capt. Seth Warner and 100 Green Mountain Boys on May 12, 1775 in the battle of Crown Point at the start of the Revolutionary War. The Americans captured 111 cannons from the British at Crown Point, and transported 29 to Boston for the defense of Boston Harbor.

The fort was used as a staging ground by Benedict Arnold during the Revolution for his navy on Lake Champlain. That was destroyed in 1776 during the Battle of Valcour Island, and the fort was abandoned to the British in 1777 after the failure of the patriot Invasion of Canada. The British abandoned the fort in 1780, and the United States had no need for it and left it to deteriorate.

The large earthen walls are still visible today. The fire of April 1773 had entirely destroyed the log and earth fortress. The stone ruins of two barracks buildings at the site are being preserved. The fort was declared a National Historic Landmark in 1968.

== Visits by Founding Fathers ==
- Benjamin Franklin, traveling to Canada, seeking an alliance against the British
- George Washington, July 21, 1783, the furthest north he ever traveled
- Future Presidents Thomas Jefferson and James Madison in 1791

== Gallery ==
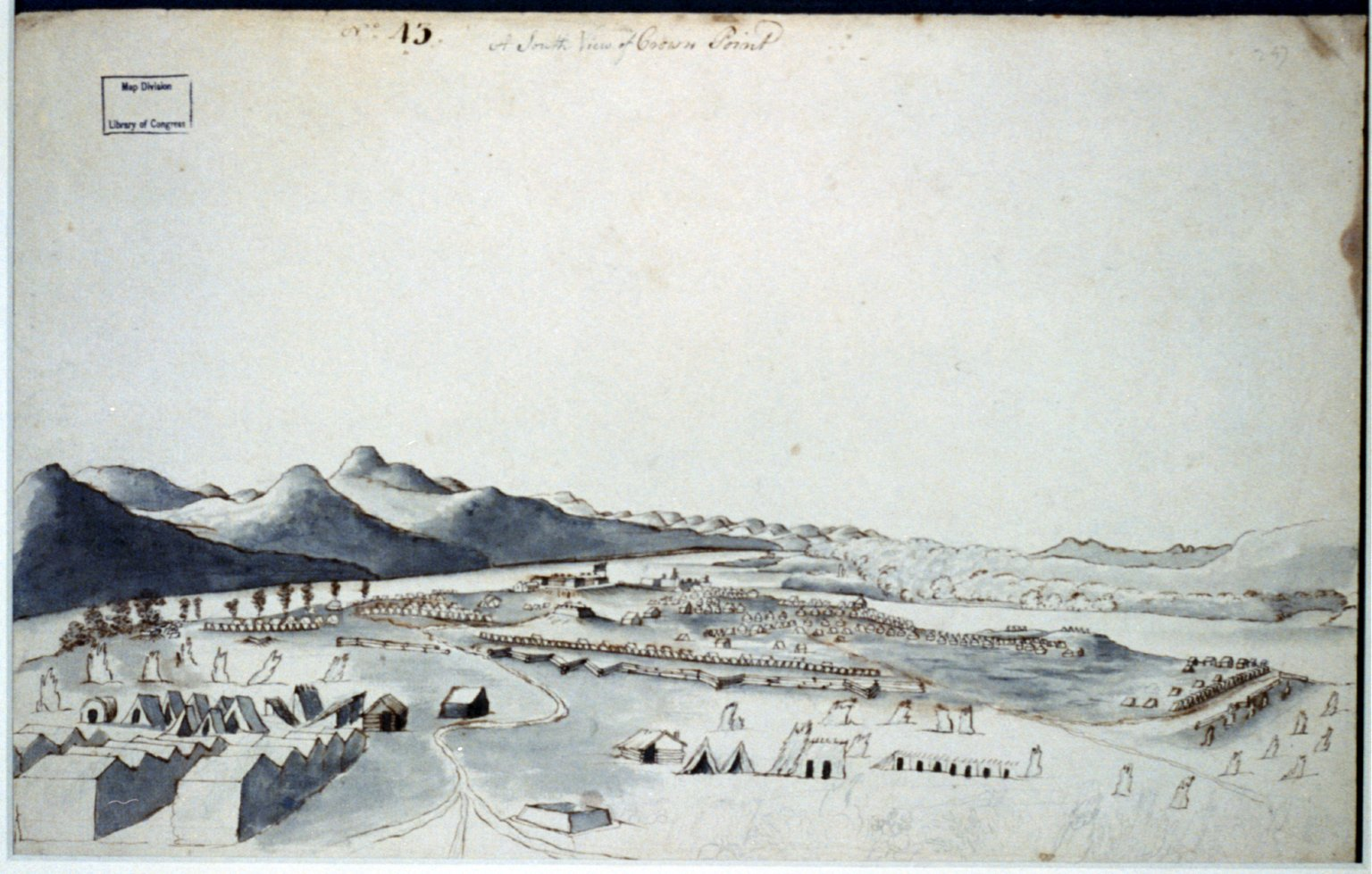
A south view of Crown Point 1760 by Thomas Davies.

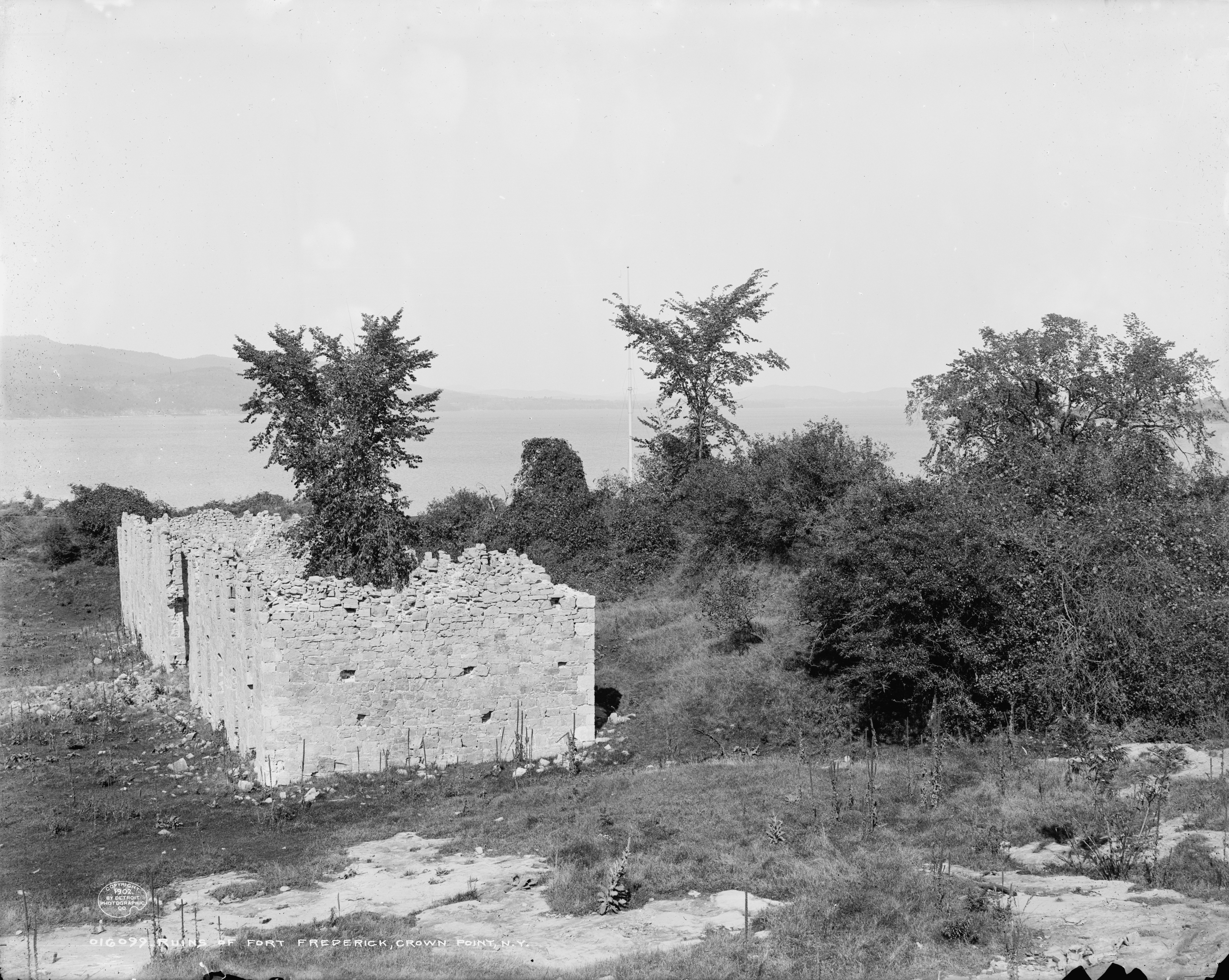
Ruins of Fort at Crown Point, Crown Point, N.Y. c. 1902.

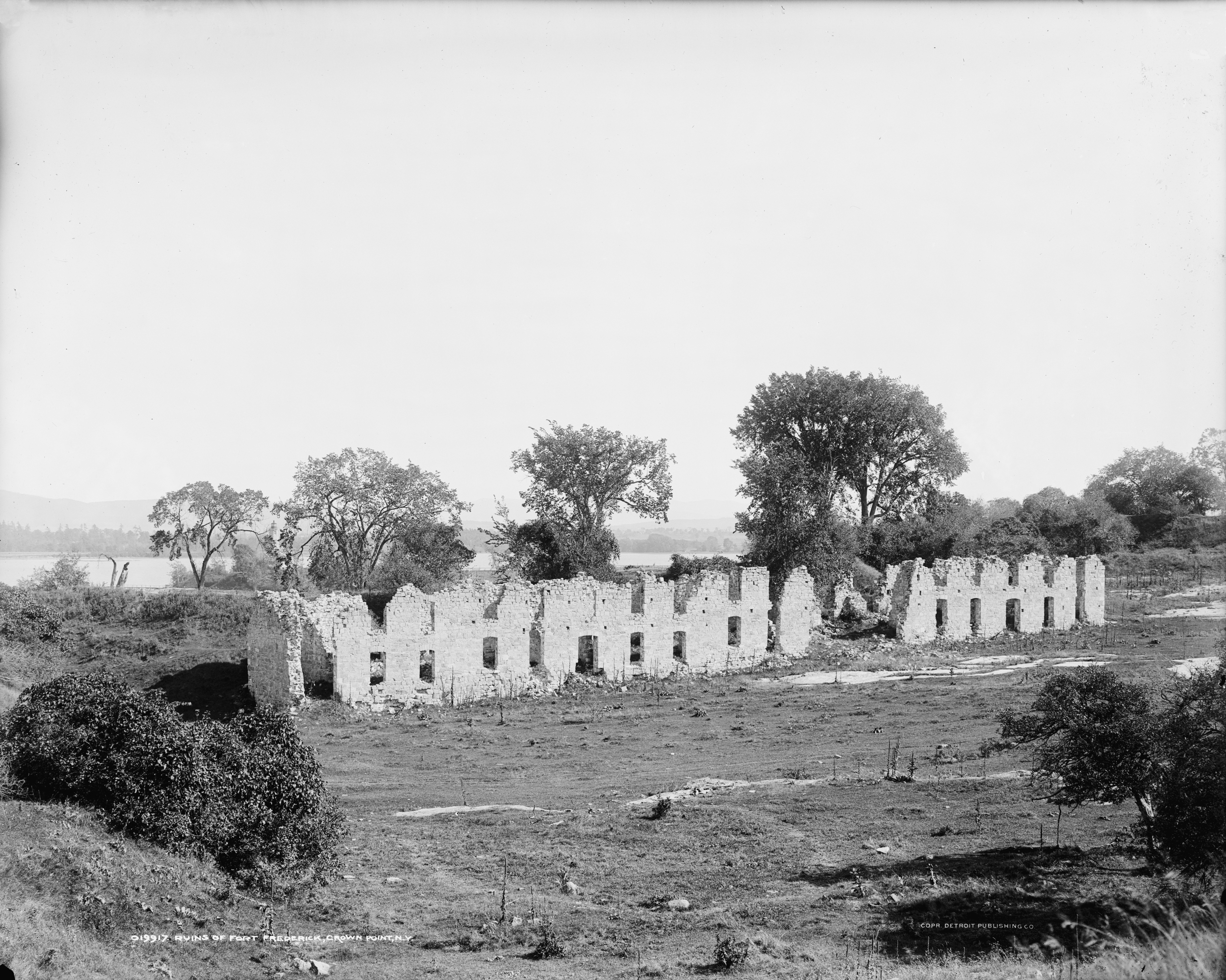
Ruins of Fort at Crown Point, Crown Point, N.Y. c. 1907.

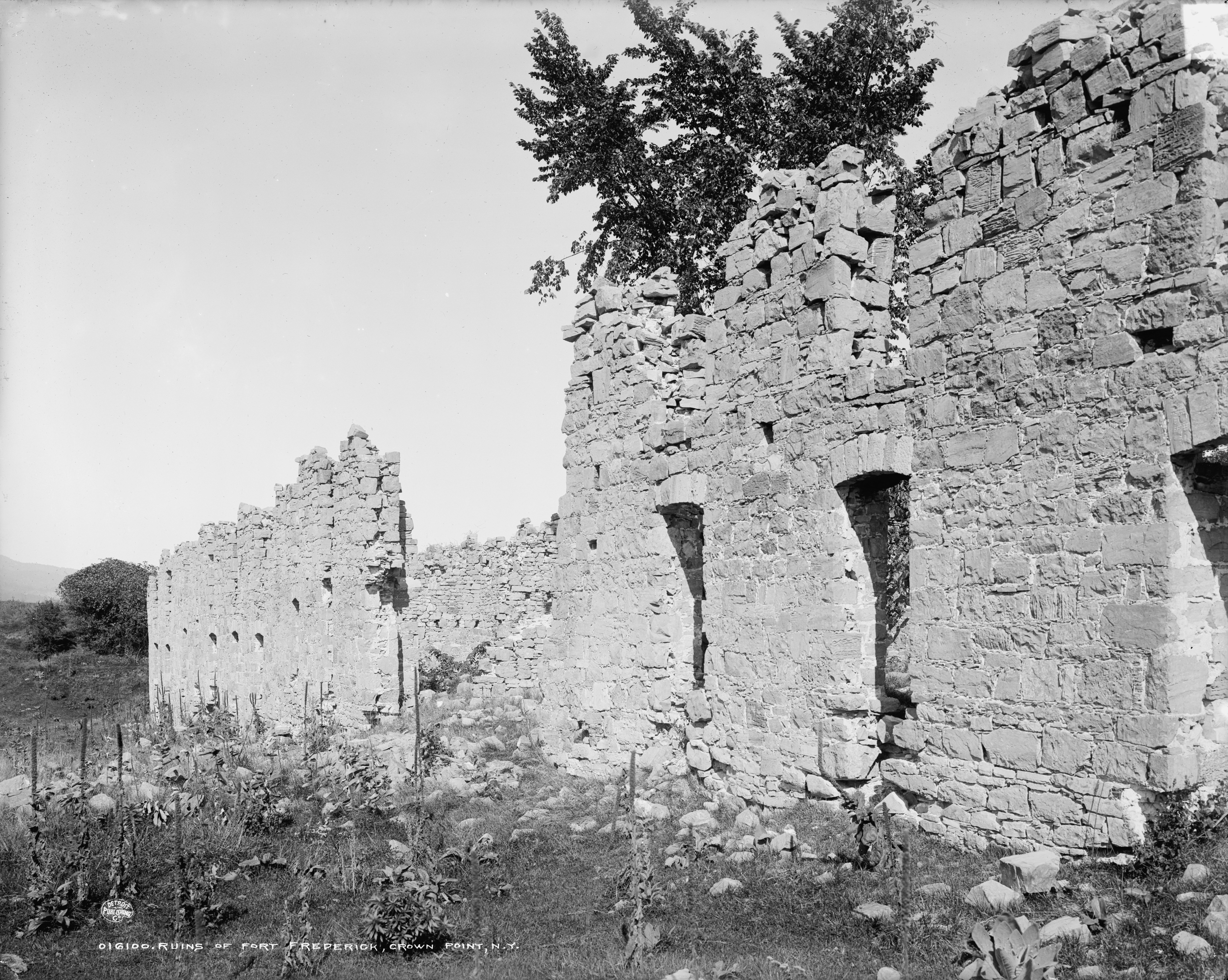
Ruins of Fort at Crown Point, Crown Point, N.Y. between 1900 and 1906.

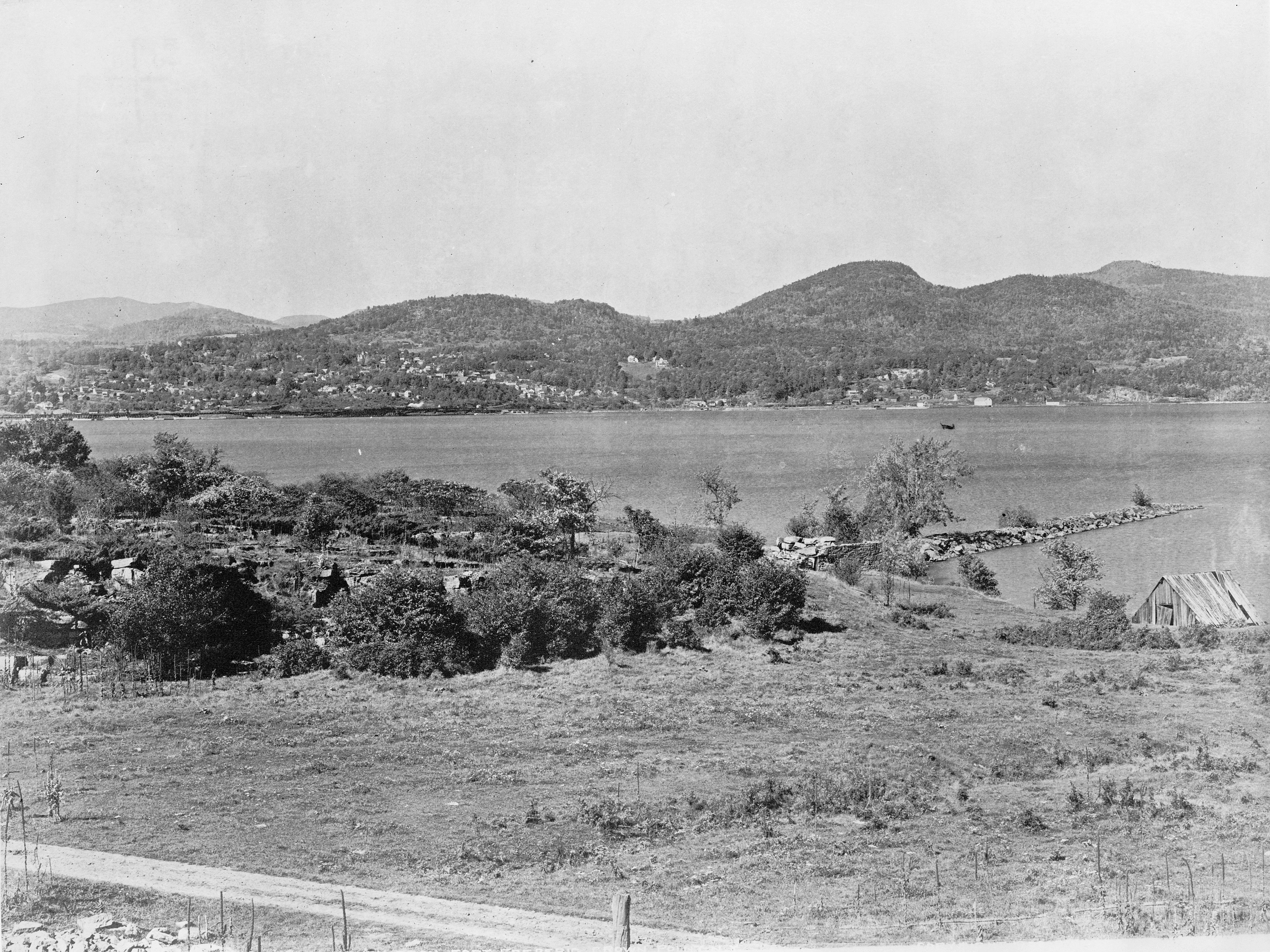
Port Henry from Crown Point, Crown Point, N.Y. Photograph shows view across Lake Champlain at hills in the distance on December 23, 1902.

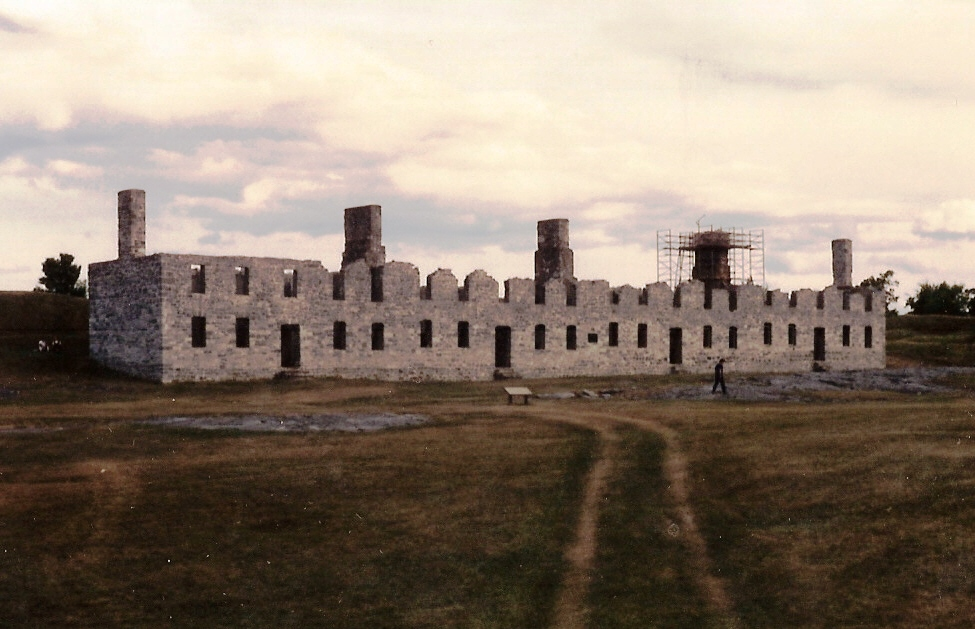
Main building of Fort at Crown Point, N.Y. in 1990.

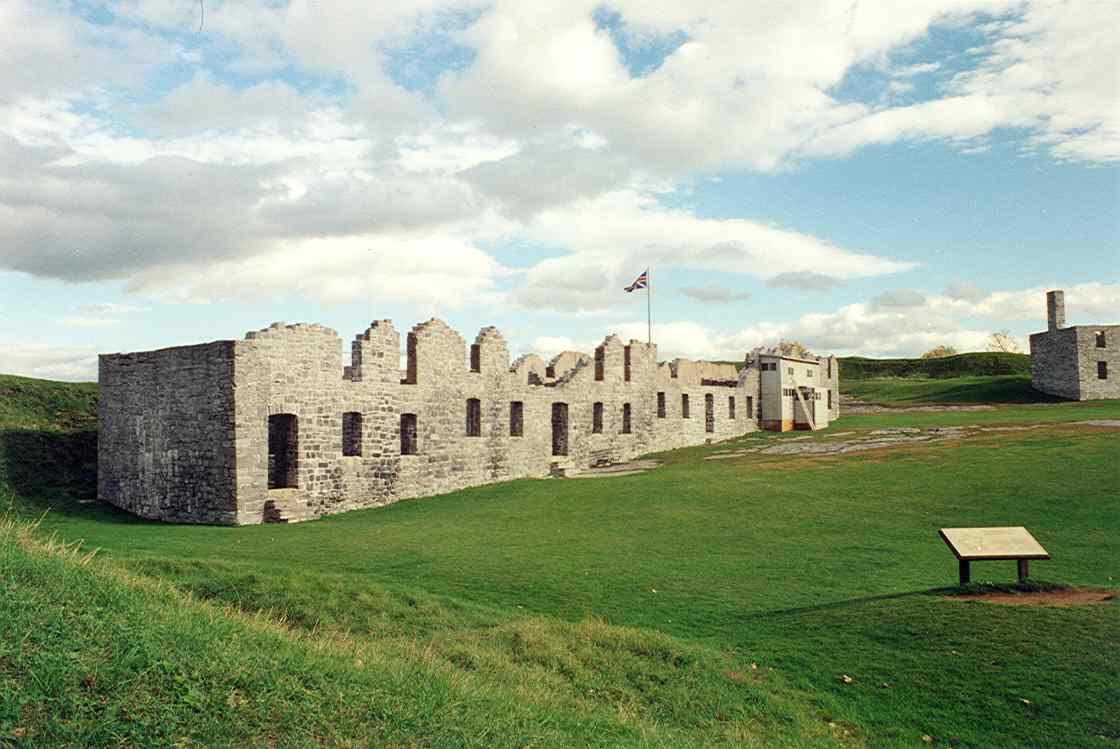
Fort at Crown Point, N.Y. in 1995.

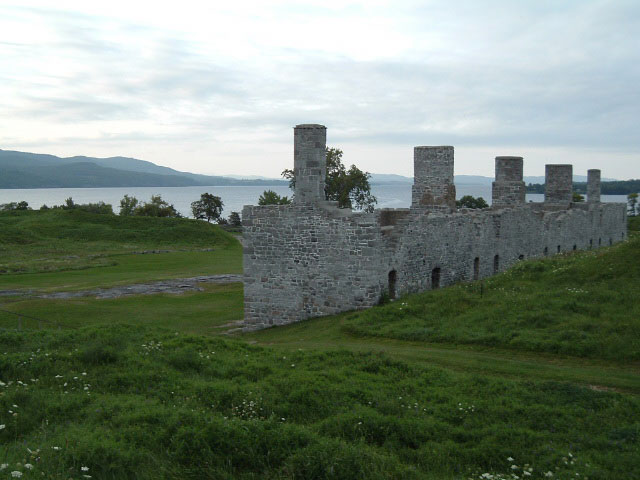
Ruins of Fort at Crown Point, Crown Point, N.Y. in 2004.

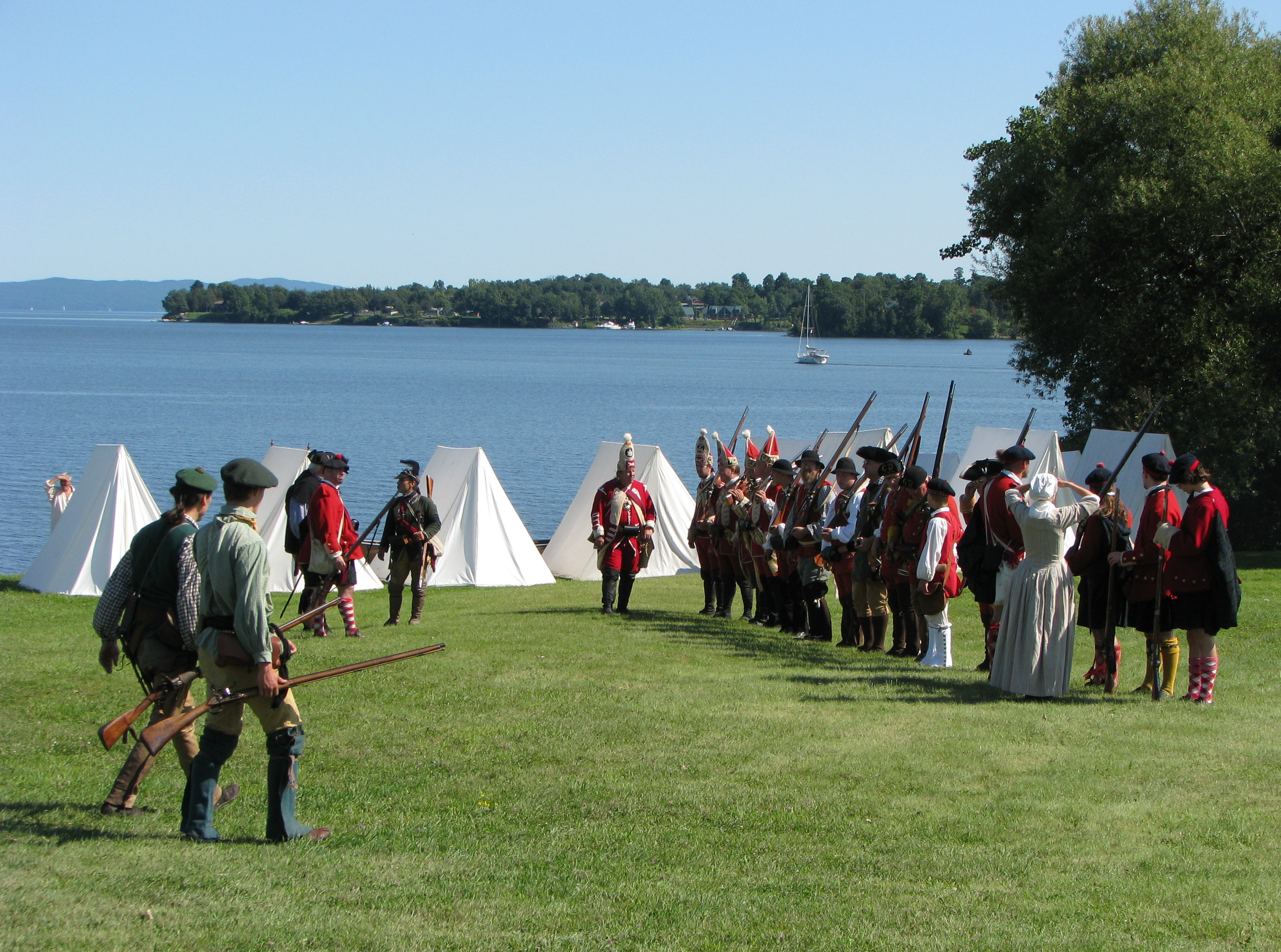
An historical reenactment at Fort Crown Point, 8 August 2009.

== See also ==
- List of National Historic Landmarks in New York
- National Register of Historic Places listings in Essex County, New York
