= Ironville Historic District =

Historic district in New York, United States

- U.S. National Register of Historic Places
- U.S. Historic district
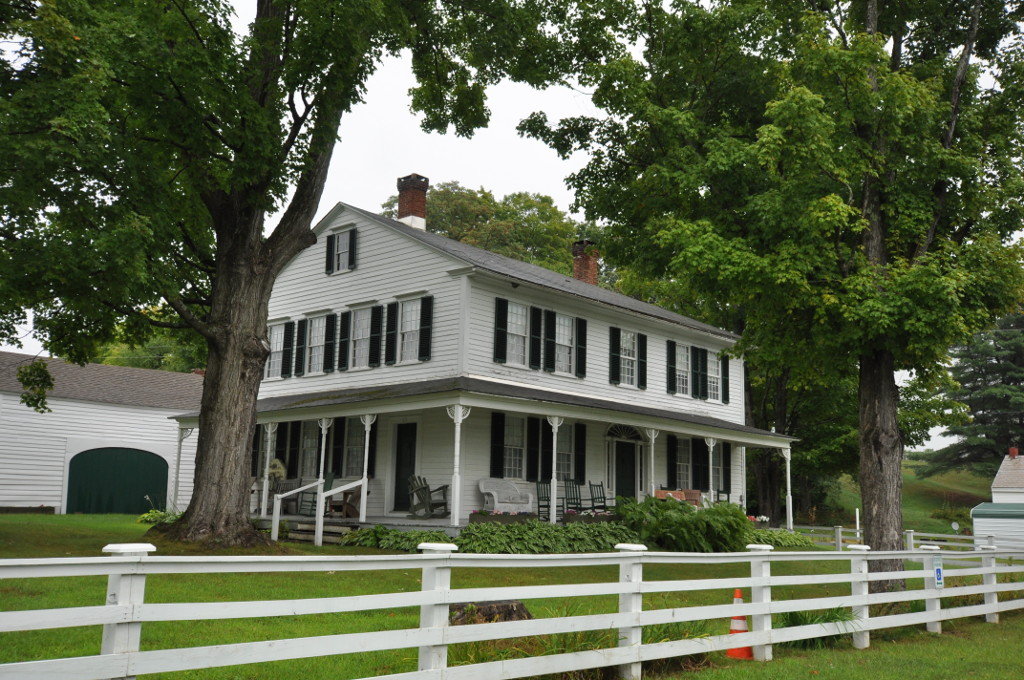

- Location within New York Location within the United States
- Location: Area surrounding Ironville including Furnace St. and Penfield Pond, Ironville, New York
- Coordinates: 43°55′17″N 73°32′7″W
- Area: 73 acres (30 ha)
- Architectural style: Greek Revival
- NRHP reference No.: 74001237
- Added to NRHP: December 27, 1974

Ironville Historic District is a national historic district located at Ironville in Essex County, New York. The district contains 12 contributing buildings. It encompasses the area associated with a once thriving iron works. Almost nothing remains of the iron works itself. The remaining buildings consists of modest wooden dwellings including the Penfield Homestead (1828; now a museum), boarding house (1827), Congregational Church (1842), commercial building / grange hall (1870s), and cemetery. Ironville is known as the "Birthplace of the Electrical Age", being the site of the first industrial application of electricity in the United States.

It was listed on the National Register of Historic Places in 1974.
