= Glastonbury (disambiguation) =

Glastonbury is a town in Somerset, England.

Glastonbury or Glastenbury may also refer to:

- Glastonbury Festival, a music and performing arts festival founded in 1970 near the English town, formerly Glastonbury Fair
- Glastonbury Festival (1914–25), a cultural festival founded by the composer Rutland Boughton

== Media ==
- Glastonbury (film), a 2006 documentary by Julien Temple about the modern English festival
- Glastonbury Fayre (album), album of the 1971 Glastonbury Fair
- Glastonbury Fayre (film), a 1972 documentary film by Nicolas Roeg and Peter Neal of the 1971 Glastonbury Fair

== Places ==
=== Australia ===
- Glastonbury, Queensland, a locality in the Gympie Region, Queensland
- Glastonbury Division, a former local government area in Queensland, Australia

=== Canada ===
- Glastonbury, Edmonton, a residential neighbourhood in Alberta, Canada

=== United Kingdom ===
- Glastonbury Abbey, a ruined monastery in the English town
- Glastonbury Canal, England
- Glastonbury Tor, a hill near the English town
- Glastonbury and Street railway station, a former station in England

=== United States ===
- Glastonbury, Connecticut, a town in the United States formerly called Glastenbury
  - Glastonbury Center, Connecticut, a census-designated place, center of the town
- Glastenbury, Vermont, a town in the United States
- Glastenbury Mountain, a mountain in Vermont, United States
- Glastenbury Wilderness, Vermont, United States

== People ==
- Ray Glastonbury (1938–2026), British rugby league footballer

== Other uses ==
- Glastonbury F.C., a football club based in Glastonbury, England

== See also ==
- Glastonbury and Somerton (UK Parliament constituency)
