= National recreation area =

Type of protected area in the United States

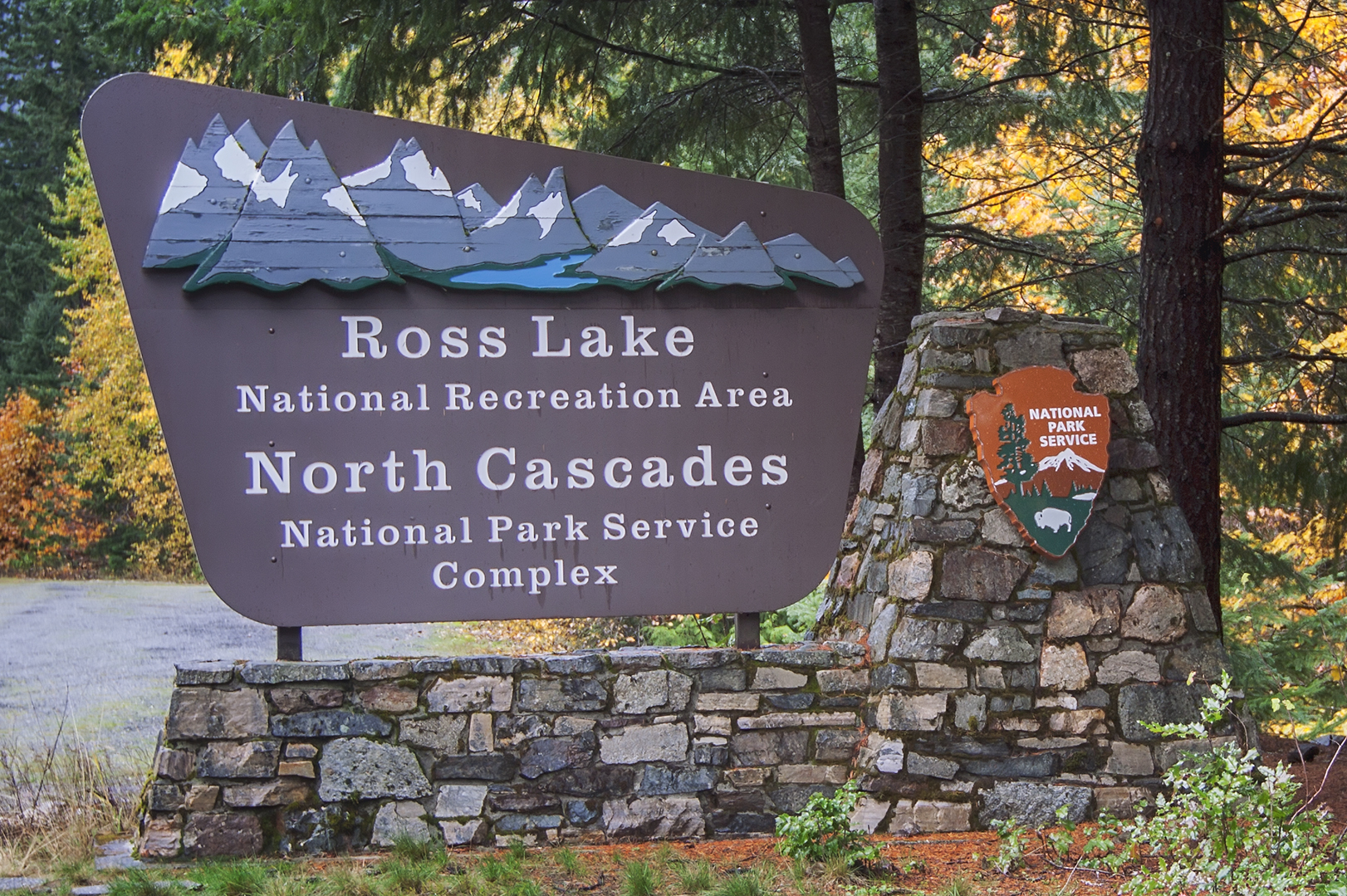
East entry sign for the Ross Lake National Recreation Area in Washington

A national recreation area (NRA) is a protected area in the United States established by an Act of Congress to preserve enhanced recreational opportunities in places with significant natural and scenic resources. There are 41 NRAs, which emphasize a variety of activities for visitors, including hiking, camping, boating, fishing, swimming, biking, horseback riding, and wildlife viewing, in areas that include multiple-use management for both conservation and limited utilization of natural resources. They have diverse features and contexts, being established around reservoirs, in urban areas, and within forests. Due to their size, diversity of activities, and proximity to population centers, NRAs are among the most visited units of the National Park System, with six among the thirty most visited sites.

The first NRA was Lake Mead National Recreation Area, which was created by a 1936 agreement between the United States Bureau of Reclamation (USBR), which had built Hoover Dam, and the National Park Service (NPS), which had experience in managing visitors in the outdoors. Because the reservoir had disturbed the natural state of the environment, a new designation was devised that allowed for more intensive land use while maintaining the NPS's role in conservation and historic preservation. The system of NRAs grew as the USBR constructed more dams near urban areas where there was a need for outdoor recreation.

NRAs are managed by the NPS, the United States Forest Service (USFS), and the Bureau of Land Management (BLM). Of the NPS's 18 sites, 12 are based around large reservoirs featuring water recreation, 5 are near urban areas and include both historic preservation and outdoor recreation, and the last is at a river where a reservoir was planned but not built. Of the USFS's 23 sites, 5 are at or near reservoirs, and the rest are other exemplary recreation sites within national forests.

The 41 NRAs are located in 26 states; California and Washington have the most, each with four. NRAs of the USFS have a total area of 3,261,818 acres (13,200 km^{2}), and those of the NPS total 3,714,735 acres (15,033 km^{2}). The BLM's one NRA is approximately 1,000,000 acres (4,000 km^{2}).

== History ==
=== Origin ===
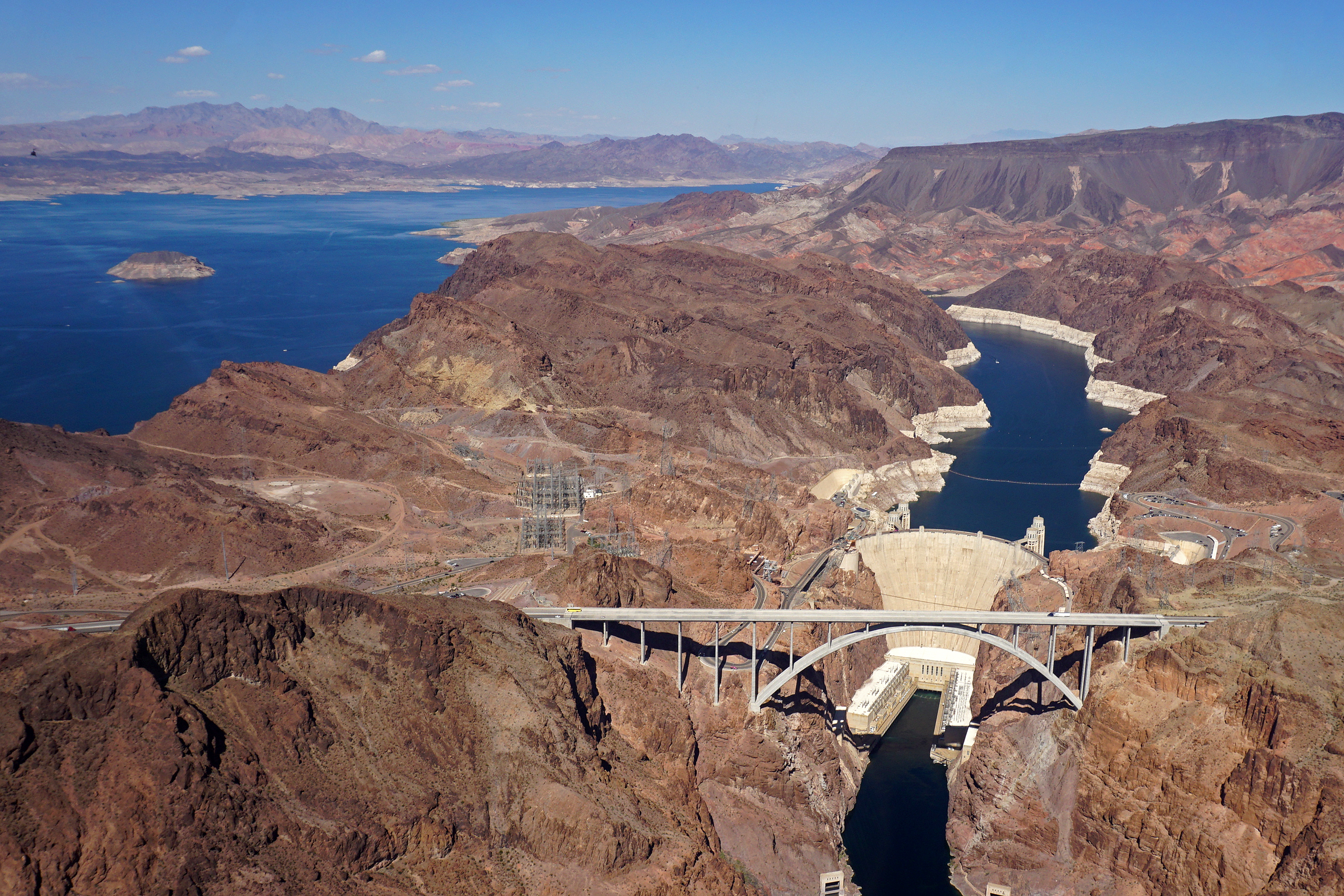
Hoover Dam and Lake Mead between Nevada and Arizona

The U.S. Bureau of Reclamation was planning the construction of Boulder Dam (now Hoover Dam) on the Colorado River in the late 1920s and saw the potential for recreation at the scenic area in Nevada and Arizona around the future Lake Mead, to then be the world's largest reservoir. The car was expanding access to travel in the growing Southwest and the USBR wanted to bring about the outdoor activities that would be enabled by its enormous project, but it lacked the experience and desire to provide facilities and services for recreation. Following the controversy of the Hetch Hetchy Reservoir that flooded a scenic valley in Yosemite National Park, the National Park Service sought to balance its conservation and recreation efforts with dams, and it could provide the expertise for such visitor infrastructure at the Boulder Canyon Project.

A proposed 8,000 mi^{2} (21,000 km^{2}) Virgin National Park in that region promoted by Secretary of the Interior Ray Lyman Wilbur was praised for its scenic and historic resources but rejected in 1930 by NPS Director Horace M. Albright due to a reservoir's inherent lack of a natural landscape expected for a national park. The political leaders at the Department of the Interior nevertheless wanted to manage the significant lands for tourism and recreation. Farming interests in the Arizona Strip area also wanted to keep their grazing access to the public lands. A 1932 study by Yellowstone National Park superintendent Roger Toll evaluated the region and recognized some sites of interest but again dismissed it as inconsistent with national parks' and monuments' standards and purpose of preservation. Separately that year the secretary's advisor Louis C. Cramton led further studies of the area between the dam site and Grand Canyon National Park and recommended the creation of Grand Canyon National Monument (II) for the pristine upstream eastern section; it would later be incorporated into the park. Cramton proposed that the western section, which had less spectacular scenery, the dam and reservoir, livestock grazing, and mining, but nationally important recreational importance, be designated as the "Boulder Canyon National Reservation", consistent with terminology used in the National Park Service Organic Act. A bill to establish it was introduced in Congress in 1933 with mixed support and failed to advance, while Albright reluctantly agreed to support the USBR with visitor services.

As part of the New Deal, President Franklin D. Roosevelt strongly promoted tourism to a growing Park System, with increased emphasis on recreation at facilities constructed by the job-creating Civilian Conservation Corps. The NPS, now under Director Arno B. Cammerer, took advantage of federal funds to claim the reservoir area and highlight natural features and development needs. Despite the lack of legislation establishing the reservation, the USBR's inability to manage the influx of tourists at the newly finished Lake Mead led Interior Secretary Harold L. Ickes to direct for negotiation of a memorandum of agreement that gave the NPS responsibility for the reserved lands and surface of the lake, but not Boulder Dam itself, maintaining mining and grazing so long as they did not disrupt recreation. Ickes signed it on October 13, 1936, establishing the Boulder Dam Recreation Area, and the NPS quickly built significant infrastructure for sightseeing visitors and contracted with concessionaires. This was a major compromise and precedent that expanded the Park Service's mission beyond the strict conservation of national parks and monuments to include broader outdoor recreation that coexists with other land uses.

=== Further development ===
The Park, Parkway, and Recreation Area Study Act of 1936 had the NPS analyze the needs for outdoor recreation and collaborate with state and local governments, officially expanding its mission beyond national parks. With skepticism remaining among agency veterans, planning still emphasized scenery and preservation. The Act's mandates and provision for interagency cooperation, however, resulted in more versatile land acquisition as the NPS defined its mission. In the 1940s, under the leadership of associate director Conrad L. Wirth, the NPS prepared a National Recreation Plan and conducted a number of studies with the USBR and the United States Army Corps of Engineers (USACE) assessing the natural impact, recreational opportunities, and significance of proposed reservoirs.

In 1947 the Boulder Dam Recreation Area was renamed Lake Mead National Recreation Area and expanded to include Lake Mohave above the USBR's new Davis Dam. This interagency partnership was successful in creating many recreation areas at reservoirs: nine more were created by agreement with USBR and two more with other dam agencies in the next two decades under the leadership of Wirth as director. However, it contributed to the controversial proposals of Echo Park Dam and Bridge Canyon Dam in existing NPS areas that were canceled after considerable opposition from environmentalists.

These new sites were mainly designated as just "recreation areas" since they did not necessarily have national significance. Several would be transferred to the United States Forest Service and other agencies, being more efficient for management. USFS took over Shasta Lake Recreation Area in Shasta National Forest in 1948 as its first. The Forest Service had traditionally focused on forestry for timber and custodial management, and the 1950s saw debate among the agencies, extraction interests, and conservationists as demand for recreation increased the need for multiple-use planning. The Multiple-Use Sustained-Yield Act of 1960 for the first time established recreation and wildlife as equal priorities for the Forest Service with range, timber, and watershed oversight.

The Park Service took a utilitarian approach to its recreation areas, acknowledging their less-than-national significance and focused on providing useful facilities and allowing a wider range of activities. Through the 1950s, many traditionalists at the NPS saw recreation areas championed by Wirth as distractions with open questions of how to manage and square them with the broader aims of the agency. As increased visitation forced answers to these, Lake Mead served as a model for administration at other recreational units, experiencing changing demands of the public and more day-use visitors. Wirth advocated for changing the Lake Mead's designation to "national recreation park," which would emphasize its importance with autonomy from the USBR. His Mission 66 vision provided capital investment for construction of visitor services and infrastructure across the park system.

=== Standardization and expansion ===
In 1963, the Recreation Advisory Council, created by executive order of President John F. Kennedy and composed of five major government officials, issued a policy that recognized the need for and established criteria for establishing NRAs. The council recommended that NRAs should focus on growing "recreation demand" more than preservation, conservation, or development; have significant natural and recreational quality greater than that of state lands, even if not as unique as other parts of the National Park System; and provide opportunity for recreation consistent with other federal public lands programs. It outlined seven mandatory criteria and six secondary criteria for establishing NRAs, including a minimum size, ability to attract a significant number of visitors from nearby and beyond its state, and filling a regional need with recreation as the dominant purpose. The policy also called for national recreation areas to be established by acts of Congress and for them to be able to be managed by multiple agencies as necessary, including as partnerships with states. The Bureau of Outdoor Recreation (rather than the NPS) was charged with studying proposals and referring them to the council for recommendation. This process gave flexibility to the NPS and USFS to develop their own guidelines for unmet future recreational needs.

In response Congress made Lake Mead National Recreation Area the first such area to be established by statute in October 1964, finally resolving the complicated co-management of USBR land as sole NPS jurisdiction. It eventually codified most of the existing recreation areas under the new national designation (Lake Roosevelt and Curecanti NRAs are the only NPS areas that have not been permanently established by Congress or the president). Lake Mead is still the largest NRA and is the most visited among those at reservoirs. The first new NRA under USFS administration was Spruce Knob–Seneca Rocks NRA, established in 1965. Congress initially authorized Delaware Water Gap NRA in 1965 with the expectation that the Tocks Island Reservoir would serve the New York and Philadelphia areas as the first NRA east of the Mississippi River, but local and environmental opposition led to the dam's cancellation. The NRA remains as the forested area intended to be flooded by the Delaware River. Mount Rogers NRA was also delayed and downsized, losing a planned reservoir and ski area.

A 1968 NPS publication outlined policies for administration of recreational areas, which were distinct from its natural and historical areas. This included not only NRAs but also national lakeshores and seashores, national parkways, and some national scenic riverways; at that time there were 22 such areas, and recreation would be the dominant resource objective, but with multiple intensive uses allowed. But because most units contained a combination of natural, historic, and recreational lands, the General Authorities Act of 1970 made all areas equal within the National Park System; separate policy manuals for each were replaced in 1975 with one that would tailor policies in each park respective to the purpose of zones within.

In 1972 Congress established two NRAs in urban areas as the first urban national parks: Golden Gate NRA in the San Francisco area and Gateway NRA in New York City, both with beaches, historic military sites, and natural conservation areas. Spearheaded by Director George Hartzog, this controversially expanded the Park Service's responsibilities into local urban recreation (in addition to the National Capital Parks), and after he left, the NPS opposed the creation of Cuyahoga Valley NRA south of Cleveland and Santa Monica Mountains NRA west of Los Angeles. The former was redesignated a national park in 2000. Chattahoochee River NRA north of Atlanta was created in 1978 and Boston Harbor Islands NRA in 1996. The Santa Monica Mountains and Boston Harbor Islands are partnerships with state parks and local agencies.

Ashley Karst National Recreation and Geologic Area is the newest NRA, designated in 2019. The Land and Water Conservation Fund provided funding for the purchase of land at several NRAs.

== Management ==
Three federal agencies manage the 41 NRAs. The National Park Service, in the Department of the Interior, manages 18, the U.S. Forest Service, in the Department of Agriculture, manages 23, and the Bureau of Land Management, in the Department of the Interior, manages one. One NRA, Whiskeytown–Shasta–Trinity, comprises three units, two of which are Forest Service and one is National Park Service. The NPS sites are stand-alone units of the National Park System, while the US Forest Service sites are all part of national forests except Land Between the Lakes. Several of the larger USFS NRAs are managed equivalent to a ranger district, but most are designated areas within one. The Green Mountain National Forest is the only one with two NRAs. The Forest Service manages its NRAs as "showcases" of its management standards so that their programs, services, and facilities should be models for its other recreation sites. The USBR operates dams in the West, with eleven NRAs built around them, while the USACE primarily operates dams in the East, with reservoirs or areas near four part of NRAs; three more are based around reservoirs operated by other agencies.

As the primary focus of land management is recreation (rather than conservation), limited land use such as grazing, logging, and mineral leasing is permitted only if it does not interfere with the recreational use of the land. The establishing legislation of each NRA usually specifies multiple purposes of the designation. Hunting is by default banned in areas of the National Park Service unless explicitly permitted by law; 15 of 18 NRAs of the NPS allow hunting – and it is generally permitted in National Forest lands – in accordance with local rules.

== List of national recreation areas ==
The Mississippi National River and Recreation Area and Big South Fork National River and Recreation Area share many features with the NRAs but are classified by the NPS with the national rivers and are not listed here. The USFS has four additional designated "recreation areas" that have similar management practices but are not listed here. The USFS and BLM do not collect visitor data for most sites, marked with an asterisk.

National recreation areas
Name	Image	Location	Agency	Date est.	Area	Visitors (2019)	Description
Allegheny	Lake surrounded by a forest in fall colors	Pennsylvania; 41.66°N 79.03°W	USFS	October 30, 1984	24,149 acres (97.7 km^{2})	*	This conserves forests on both sides of a portion of the Allegheny Reservoir and a smaller separate area adjacent to the Allegheny River, featuring several hiking trails and campsites. Part of Allegheny National Forest.
Amistad	Aerial view of the shoreline of the lake with	Texas; 29.45°N 101.05°W	NPS	November 28, 1990	62,945 acres (254.7 km^{2})	1,267,900	The 1969 Amistad Dam forms the Amistad Reservoir on the Rio Grande at the border with Mexico. Monarch butterflies migrate through the area every fall, and wildlife along the reservoir's shores includes javelina, mouflon and aoudad sheep, and blackbuck antelope. Clear water provides for easy scuba diving, with complex caves for experts.
Arapaho	Lake with mountains in background and tall trees in foreground	Colorado; 40.14°N 105.81°W	USFS	October 11, 1978	34,621 acres (140.1 km^{2})	*	This NRA adjacent to Rocky Mountain National Park has five reservoirs of the Colorado-Big Thompson Project, the largest of which is Lake Granby. The lakes are a popular place to boat and fish, camp and hike, and horseback ride. Ospreys and bald eagles are prevalent, among other wildlife of the Rocky Mountains. Part of Arapaho-Roosevelt National Forest.
Ashley Karst		Utah 40.66°N 109.91°W	USFS	March 12, 2019	173,475 acres (702.03 km^{2})	*	Congress established this area as a "national recreation and geologic area" to conserve karst watershed and geologic features on the south slope of the Uinta Mountains. Part of Ashley National Forest.
Bighorn Canyon	Aerial view of river winding through a steep canyon	Montana, Wyoming; 45.03°N 108.26°W	NPS	October 15, 1966	120,296 acres (486.8 km^{2})	249,659	The Yellowtail Dam, completed in 1967, formed Bighorn Lake on the Bighorn River, which provide opportunities for wildlife viewing, hiking, boating, and trout fishing. Visitors can tour four historic ranches or cycle near the prehistoric Bad Pass Trail. Wild mustangs roam in the overlapping Pryor Mountains Wild Horse Range.
Boston Harbor Islands	Small island with a star-shaped fort taking up much of its area and a beach on one side	Massachusetts; 42.31°N 70.94°W	NPS	November 12, 1996	1,482 acres (6.0 km^{2})	*	Thirty-four islands and peninsulas in Boston Harbor make an urban oasis with open space for hiking or tide pooling. Seasonal ferries and private boats provide access to America's second oldest lighthouse, Boston Light, and the Civil War-era Fort Warren. It is managed by a partnership that includes a Massachusetts state park of the same name.
Chattahoochee River	River flowing between forests with fall colors	Georgia; 33.98°N 84.32°W	NPS	August 15, 1978	12,509 acres (50.6 km^{2})	3,393,133	Fifteen sections of park land tightly follow the Chattahoochee River for 48 miles (77 km) below the Buford Dam. Each unit has hiking trails, but visitors can also float down the river in a canoe, kayak, or boat.
Chickasaw	Small waterfall along a river's path with trees shading it	Oklahoma; 34.50°N 96.97°W	NPS	March 17, 1976	9,898 acres (40.1 km^{2})	1,422,612	The original Platt National Park was a small but popular area of mineral springs donated by the Chickasaw people. The high-output springs form Travertine Creek, with several small waterfalls alongside trails. The Lake of the Arbuckles was dammed in 1966 and protected as Arbuckle NRA. It has a significant bass population and nearby campgrounds. The two were merged in 1976.
Curecanti	River below a steep rocky cliff	Colorado; 38.46°N 107.17°W	NPS	February 11, 1965	43,590 acres (176.4 km^{2})	836,034	This lies around the Blue Mesa, Morrow Point and Crystal Reservoirs on the Gunnison River upriver of its Black Canyon. All three reservoirs offer boating, camping, and hiking.
Delaware Water Gap	Aerial view of a river turning between rolling hills with forests in fall colors	New Jersey, Pennsylvania; 41.15°N 74.91°W	NPS	September 1, 1965	68,708 acres (278.1 km^{2})	3,374,865	Originally intended to surround a reservoir formed by the Tocks Island Dam, it became a larger natural area around 40 miles (64 km) of the free-flowing Delaware River when the project was canceled. Historic hamlets that would have been inundated are open for tours. A biking and hiking trail runs the length of it parallel to the river, as does a segment of the Appalachian Trail. Rock climbers can scale cliffs of the Delaware Water Gap.
Ed Jenkins	Forest in foreground with outline of mountains in the background	Georgia; 34.63°N 84.2°W	USFS	December 11, 1991	23,545 acres (95.3 km^{2})	*	Springer Mountain, the southern end of the Appalachian Trail, is the centerpiece of this portion of the Blue Ridge Mountains. Its forests protect streams of the Chattahoochee River watershed. Part of Chattahoochee–Oconee National Forest.
Flaming Gorge	Wide river with sloped landscape on both sides,	Wyoming, Utah; 40.91°N 109.42°W	USFS	October 1, 1968	189,817 acres (768.2 km^{2})	*	The Flaming Gorge Reservoir (Flaming Gorge Dam) was named for the bright red sandstone cliffs of this canyon of the Green River. It has several marinas and boat-in campsites. Part of Ashley National Forest.
Gateway	Battery fort in front of the Verazzano Narrows Bridge	New York, New Jersey; 40.45°N 73.99°W	NPS	October 27, 1972	26,606 acres (107.7 km^{2})	9,405,622	This urban NRA has three segments around the Hudson–Raritan Estuary. At New Jersey's Sandy Hook, visitors can relax on seven beaches and tour Fort Hancock and the country's oldest lighthouse. Jamaica Bay in Brooklyn and Queens provides habitat for birds, turtles, and horseshoe crabs in its salt marshes, islands, and dunes. Several peninsulas around the bay offer beaches and park space, including Floyd Bennett Field, a repurposed airfield with the only campground in New York City and several sporting facilities. On Staten Island the historic Fort Wadsworth guarded The Narrows for two centuries and Great Kills Park offers a beach, nature trails, and a marina.
Gauley River	Light rapids of a river between rocky riverbanks	West Virginia; 38.20°N 80.89°W	NPS	October 26, 1988	11,565 acres (46.8 km^{2})	119,282	The 25 miles (40 km) of the Gauley River downstream of the Summersville Dam and 5 miles (8 km) of the Meadow River offer "premier whitewater" rafting with Class V rapids six weekends in the fall when water is released from the dam. There are a few river access points for fishing.
Glen Canyon	Aerial view of tall red rock mesas rising above the reservoir with a cloudy sky	Utah, Arizona; 36.99°N 111.48°W	NPS	October 27, 1972	1,254,116 acres (5,075.2 km^{2})	4,330,563	The area around Lake Powell, formed by the Glen Canyon Dam on the Colorado River, is rich with sandstone formations where rivers eroded down sweeping canyons leaving scores of towering buttes, natural arches, and striated cliffs. Scenic vistas include Horseshoe Bend, Hole in the Rock, and Rainbow Bridge National Monument.
Golden Gate	Aerial view of the Golden Gate Bridge connecting the wooded Presidio to the hilly Marin Headlands	California; 37.80°N 122.46°W	NPS	October 27, 1972	82,116 acres (332.3 km^{2})	15,002,227	Combining historic sites and beaches in San Francisco with the hills of the Marin Headlands and ridges of the San Francisco Peninsula, this NRA is one of the two most visited units of the National Park System. The urban waterfront area includes the penitentiary of Alcatraz Island, the Presidio of San Francisco, the Sutro Baths ruins, and Fort Point. Across the Golden Gate hikers can hike through wooded valleys and among coast redwoods of Muir Woods National Monument.
Grand Island	Small lighthouse standing on the lakeshore in front of trees in fall colors	Michigan; 46.50°N 86.66°W	USFS	May 17, 1990	13,571 acres (54.9 km^{2})	*	Grand Island is in Lake Superior and accessible by a short ferry from the Upper Peninsula near Pictured Rocks National Lakeshore. Sandy beaches are reached by hiking or mountain biking on trails along coastal cliffs. Part of Hiawatha National Forest.
Hells Canyon	Narrow river turning between brown hills	Oregon, Idaho; 45.6°N 116.5°W	USFS	December 31, 1975	661,097 acres (2,675.4 km^{2})	*	Hells Canyon is the deepest river gorge in North America, with the east rim reaching up to 8,043 ft (2,452 m) above the Snake River. Whitewater rafters paddle downstream of the Hells Canyon Dam, and there are scenic vistas on rim trails. Historic sites include Nez Perce petroglyphs on canyon walls, gold mining piles, and homestead ranches. Part of Wallowa–Whitman, Nez Perce, and Payette National Forests.
Jemez	A small waterfall coming from a large mineral deposit	New Mexico; 35.77°N 106.68°W	USFS	October 12, 1993	57,732 acres (233.6 km^{2})	*	Part of the homeland of the Jemez Pueblo people, this NRA sits among red rock canyons, cliffs, and mesas in the Jemez Mountains. Colorful cottonwood and aspen trees stand over river fishing sites and hiking trails. Waterfalls, hot springs, and campsites are mainly along the Jemez River near the Valles Caldera. Part of Santa Fe National Forest.
Lake Chelan	Narrow lake extending toward the background between forested mountains	Washington; 48.32°N 120.67°W	NPS	October 2, 1968	61,946 acres (250.7 km^{2})	38,785	Part of the North Cascades National Park Complex along with Ross Lake NRA, this is nestled around the Stehekin Valley at the north end of Lake Chelan. It is accessible only by ferry up the lake to Stehekin, where there are campgrounds and cabins, or backpacking on the Pacific Crest Trail.
Lake Mead	Reservoir with rock formations rising above it and mudflats in the foreground	Nevada, Arizona; 36.07°N 114.80°W	NPS	October 8, 1964	1,495,815 acres (6,053.3 km^{2})	7,499,049	Lake Mead (Hoover Dam) and Lake Mohave (Davis Dam) are surrounded by three major desert ecosystems with slot canyons, summits, and bluffs among sandstone rocks. The lakes and Colorado River allow for canoeing, boating, fishing, and scuba diving, with access at nine harbors. Hikers can reach ruined mines and the formerly submerged town of St. Thomas. Nine wilderness areas are around the lake. A portion is also part of Grand Canyon–Parashant National Monument.
Lake Meredith	Overhead view of the lake with several bays and the large dam	Texas; 35.71°N 101.55°W	NPS	November 28, 1990	44,977 acres (182.0 km^{2})	1,328,340	Lake Meredith on the Canadian River in the Texas Panhandle offers five hiking trails, 5 miles (8.0 km) of mountain biking trails, ATV areas, and horseback riding. The shortgrass prairie ecosystem is home to the Texas horned lizard, collared lizard, greater roadrunner, and painted bunting. The adjacent Alibates Flint Quarries National Monument shows the area's unique geology of agatized dolomite.
Lake Roosevelt	Tall dark escarpment above the lake	Washington; 48.09°N 118.31°W	NPS	January 1, 1997	100,390 acres (406.3 km^{2})	1,358,818	Franklin D. Roosevelt Lake extends 150 miles (240 km) up the Columbia and Spokane Rivers from the Grand Coulee Dam, the largest power plant in the country. There are several campgrounds along the shores opposite the Colville and Spokane Indian Reservations, providing access for boating and fishing. The 1847 St. Paul's Mission near the former Kettle Falls and Fort Spokane provide interpretation of the history of the tribes, the Army, and missionaries.
Land Between The Lakes	A young bison walking between rocks in a meadow	Kentucky, Tennessee; 36.85°N 88.07°W	USFS	October 21, 1998	171,290 acres (693.2 km^{2})	958,000 (2017)	Situated between 35 miles (56 km) of the parallel reservoirs Lake Barkley (Barkley Dam) and Kentucky Lake (Kentucky Dam), this large inland peninsula has more than 300 mi (480 km) of shoreline and 500 mi (800 km) of hiking, horse, and biking trails. This mostly flat forested area features an area with elk and bison, a historic working farm, a planetarium, and nature center.
Moosalamoo	A waterfall casading over steps of rocks with mossy rocks nearby	Vermont; 43.91°N 73.01°W	USFS	December 1, 2006	15,914 acres (64.4 km^{2})	*	This area around Mount Moosalamoo features a network of hiking trails and a lakeside campground in the Green Mountains. Part of Green Mountain National Forest.
Mount Baker	Snow-capped mountain in background with rocky path in foreground	Washington; 48.71°N 121.83°W	USFS	July 3, 1984	8,789 acres (35.6 km^{2})	*	Hikers can traverse the south slope of Mount Baker to alpine campsites and a fire lookout. Snowmobiles can be ridden in the Schriebers Meadow area, unlike in the adjacent Mount Baker Wilderness. Part of Mount Baker–Snoqualmie National Forest.
Mount Hood	Butte covered in bright green trees	Oregon; 45.26°N 121.66°W	USFS	March 30, 2009	34,598 acres (140.0 km^{2})	*	This NRA has three sections to the south and east of Mount Hood. The Pacific Crest Trail and Barlow Road pass through the largest section, which has parts of two wilderness areas. One includes a segment of Fifteenmile Creek, and it and the third feature mountain biking trails. Part of Mount Hood National Forest.
Mount Rogers	Rolling hills with scattered rocks on open grassland	Virginia; 36.64°N 81.58°W	USFS	May 31, 1966	154,919 acres (626.9 km^{2})	*	This area based around Virginia's highest point, Mount Rogers, has more than 500 mi (800 km) of hiking trails, including part of the Appalachian Trail. It features four wilderness areas among the spruce-fir forests and the Mount Rogers Crest Zone. Part of George Washington and Jefferson National Forests.
Oregon Dunes	Sand dunes with an island of trees in the middle	Oregon; 43.72°N 124.17°W	USFS	March 23, 1972	34,364 acres (139.1 km^{2})	*	The Oregon Dunes are the largest coastal sand dunes in North America, covering around 7,000 acres (28 km^{2}) of a 40 miles (64 km) stretch of the Oregon Coast. Formed by thousands of years of wind and waves, the dunes offer off-road vehicle use, hiking, camping, and birdwatching. It is a protected nesting site for the western snowy plover. Part of Siuslaw National Forest.
Pine Ridge	A ridge covered in pine trees	Nebraska; 42.62°N 103.12°W	USFS	October 21, 1986	6,636 acres (26.9 km^{2})	*	This small backcountry area with no roads or facilities offers non-motorized activities through a hilly ponderosa pine forest. Part of Nebraska National Forest.
Rattlesnake	Alpine lake sitting in a basin between snowy mountains	Montana; 46.95°N 113.92°W	USFS	October 19, 1980	60,104 acres (243.2 km^{2})	*	A network of trails traverse the peaks of the Rattlesnake Mountains, with forested ridges, alpine lakes, and open slopes. The pine-spruce-fir ecosystem is home to elk, white-tailed deer, mountain goat, and grizzly bear, as well as several species of orchid. About half is protected by the Rattlesnake Wilderness. Part of Lolo National Forest.
Robert T. Stafford White Rocks	Pond reflecting the pine forest above it	Vermont; 43.38°N 72.91°W	USFS	June 19, 1984	36,563 acres (148.0 km^{2})	*	Named for Senator Robert Stafford, this roadless part of the Green Mountains has the Big Branch and Peru Peak Wilderness areas. The white rocks are slopes of deposited Cheshire quartzite revealed by glaciers during the Ice Age. It has 30 miles (48 km) of the Appalachian Trail and Vermont's Long Trail, several forested peaks with ponds, and snowmobile routes. Part of Green Mountain National Forest.
Ross Lake	Landscape of tall forested mountains with snow caps above the treeline and blue lake below	Washington; 48.67°N 121.24°W	NPS	October 2, 1968	117,574 acres (475.8 km^{2})	1,088,528	Part of the North Cascades National Park Complex along with Lake Chelan NRA, this surrounds the three reservoirs of Seattle City Light's Skagit River Hydroelectric Project: Gorge Lake, Diablo Lake, and Ross Lake, which extends into Canada. There are many boat-in backcountry campsites, and the surrounding mountains of the Cascades offer rugged hikes and mountaineering.
Santa Monica Mountains	Landscape of dry rugged hills with areas of exposed rock, steep cliffs, and low vegetation, below the sky	California; 34.10°N 118.60°W	NPS	November 10, 1978	157,698 acres (638.2 km^{2})	707,566	This collaboration between five California state parks, local public park lands, and NPS properties spans the Santa Monica Mountains characterized by chaparral and woodlands. Trails lead hikers, mountain bikers, and horseback riders from beaches through scrub valleys to peak views of the ocean. The 70 mi (110 km) Backbone Trail and the scenic Mulholland Drive traverse ridges along the width of the park.
Sawtooth	Valley covered in pine trees sweeping below rocky peaks	Idaho; 44.00°N 114.7°W	USFS	August 22, 1972	753,819 acres (3,050.6 km^{2})	303,000 (2015)	The jagged Sawtooth Range and White Cloud, Boulder, and Smoky Mountains have hundreds of alpine lakes among their peaks. More than 700 mi (1,100 km) of trails connect hikers from three dozen developed campgrounds to grasslands and forests home to at least 70 mammal species and 200 bird species. Part of Sawtooth, Salmon–Challis, and Boise National Forests.
Smith River	Narrow river between forests and next to a road	California; 41.91°N 123.86°W	USFS	November 16, 1990	329,827 acres (1,334.8 km^{2})	*	The Smith River and its tributaries, one of the longest National Wild and Scenic Rivers, run through this portion of the Klamath Mountains, offering fishing, rafting, and swimming. Trails lead to Darlingtonia pitcher plant groves in serpentine bogs and other unique botanical areas. Part of Six Rivers National Forest.
Spring Mountains	Mountain ridge with a treeless peak in the middle	Nevada; 36.27°N 115.69°W	USFS	August 4, 1993	321,708 acres (1,301.9 km^{2})	563,000 (2016)	Southern Nevada's highest point, Mount Charleston, and its wilderness area have several snow-capped peaks rising above the desert. Summer visitors can hike loop trails to the summit, and in winter they can ski and snowboard at the Lee Canyon Resort. Part of Humboldt–Toiyabe National Forest.
Spruce Knob-Seneca Rocks	Rocky cliffs extending above a forested hill in fall colors	West Virginia; 38.83°N 79.36°W	USFS	September 28, 1965	99,824 acres (404.0 km^{2})	*	Spruce Knob is the highest point in West Virginia, with wide views of the Alleghenies from an observation tower. The Seneca Rocks is a steep cliff on the River Knobs ridge with premier technical rock climbing. The 20 mi (32 km)-long Smoke Hole Canyon was formed by the South Branch Potomac River parallel to the ridge of North Fork Mountain. Part of Monongahela National Forest.
Whiskeytown–Shasta–Trinity	Long lake with short mountains in the background	California; 40.62°N 122.55°W	NPS, USFS	October 21, 1972	244,814 acres (990.7 km^{2}) (42,503 acres (172.0 km^{2}) NPS, 202,311 acres (818.7 km^{2}) USFS)	687,159 (NPS) 551,000 (USFS)	In the Trinity Mountains, the Whiskeytown Lake unit (NPS) has four major waterfalls and a historic mining district from the California Gold Rush, when prospectors displaced the Wintu people. The Shasta Lake (Shasta Dam) and Trinity Lake (Trinity Dam) units (USFS) are known for trout fishing, watersports, and scenic views. Significant species include bald eagles, northern spotted owls, Pacific giant salamander, and Howell's alkali grass. Part of Shasta–Trinity National Forest.
White Mountains	Aerial view of a mountainous landscape above small lakes and a winding river	Alaska; 65.4°N 147.81°W	BLM	December 2, 1980	1,000,000 acres (4,050 km^{2})	*	This vast area north of Fairbanks provides access to isolated hiking and camping among the White Mountains and fishing and floating on Beaver Creek. Groomed winter trails are used for skiing, dog sledding, and snowmobiling to remote cabins. Treasure-seekers can even pan for gold along Nome Creek.
Winding Stair Mountain	Road turning on top of a forested ridge	Oklahoma; 34.74°N 94.78°W	USFS	October 18, 1988	26,617 acres (107.7 km^{2})	*	The ridge of the Winding Stair Mountains runs the length of this NRA. It is traversed by the Talimena Scenic Drive and Ouachita National Recreation Trail, with scenic viewpoints along the way. Part of Ouachita National Forest.

== See also ==
- List of areas in the United States National Park System: National recreation areas
- Recreational Demonstration Area
- Protected areas of the United States
- List of national parks of the United States
- List of national monuments of the United States
- List of national memorials of the United States
- List of national lakeshores and seashores of the United States
