= Glastenbury, Vermont =

Ghost town in Vermont, United States

Coordinates: 43°00′01″N 73°04′58″W

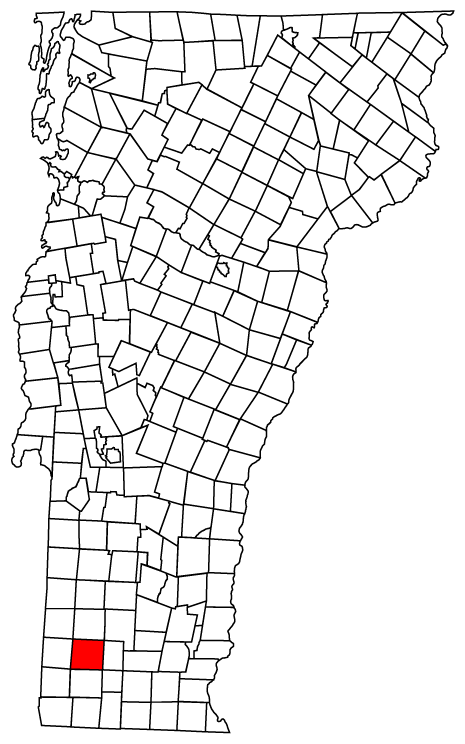
Glastenbury, Vermont

Glastenbury is a town in Bennington County, Vermont, United States. The town was unincorporated by an act of the state legislature in 1937. The population was 9 at the 2020 census. Along with Somerset, Glastenbury is one of two Vermont towns where the population levels have dropped so low that the town has been unincorporated. The town has no local government and the town's affairs are handled by a state-appointed supervisor.

== Geography ==
Glastenbury is located in central Bennington County and is bordered by the town of Sunderland to the north, Shaftsbury to the west, Woodford to the south, and Somerset in Windham County to the east. Most of the town is part of the Green Mountain National Forest. The highest point in town, near the town's geographic center, is 3,748-foot (1,142 m) Glastenbury Mountain. The Long Trail and Appalachian Trail traverse the town from its north to south border, following the crest of the Green Mountains.

According to the United States Census Bureau, the town has a total area of 44.4 square miles (115.1 km^{2}), all land.

== History ==
Glastenbury was first chartered in 1761 by New Hampshire Governor Benning Wentworth, but settlers did not begin trickling into this rocky, forbidding mountainous area for some years after. At the time of Vermont's first census as a new state in 1791, only six families inhabited it. These first settlers found life on Glastenbury Mountain difficult, as would residents ever after, and by 1800 they had been replaced by eight entirely different families. Of these eight, only three would stay on until the next census ten years later, and only one of these would remain in later decades.

Despite the many hardships that greeted Glastenbury settlers, newcomers continued to arrive in small numbers, and the population grew slowly to 76 in 1810. But the years following 1810 were hard ones for all of Vermont, and by 1840 there were only 53 left in Glastenbury. After the Civil War, Glastenbury finally began to experience more rapid growth. Business interests in nearby Bennington were eager to take advantage of the vast timber resources there, and by 1872 had finally begun construction on a railroad (trolley) which ran up the mountain. The line ran along Bolles Brook and terminated at the place where the brook forked. It was an improbable achievement, with some parts of the line climbing as much as 250 feet (76 m) in altitude per mile. Remains of the old trolley tracks can still be seen today.

Meanwhile, the population had grown to 199 in 1870, and to 241 in 1880. This includes only the enumerated population; there were many more transient workers who were drawn to the mountain to work in the then-booming logging business. Two additional sawmills were built in the 1870s, one at the original settlement, called Fayville, and one at the new settlement at the railroad terminus, which became known as South Glastenbury. Dozens of kilns were built at South Glastenbury for converting the lumber to charcoal; at this time Glastenbury was one of the three foremost sites in Vermont for producing the charcoal which was feeding iron production in nearby Shaftsbury and in Troy, New York.

By the late 1880s, however, the mountain had been cleared of nearly all of its mature trees, and the town's economy dipped dramatically. In 1889 the railroad operation ceased. It was revived briefly in 1894 as an electric passenger trolley run by the Bennington & Woodford Railroad, and a brief and initially promising effort was made to convert South Glastenbury to a tourist attraction. A small fortune was spent to convert the area into a mountain resort area which opened in the summer of 1898, but a freshet wiped out the railroad tracks that winter, marking the beginning of the end of Glastenbury as a functioning town. Population dwindled in the early twentieth century, down to only seven in 1937, when the legislature unincorporated the town.

== Demographics ==
Historical population
Census	Pop.	Note	%±
1790	34		—
1800	48		41.2%
1810	76		58.3%
1820	48		−36.8%
1830	52		8.3%
1840	53		1.9%
1850	52		−1.9%
1860	47		−9.6%
1870	119		153.2%
1880	241		102.5%
1890	181		−24.9%
1900	48		−73.5%
1910	29		−39.6%
1920	40		37.9%
1930	7		−82.5%
1940	4		−42.9%
1950	1		−75.0%
1980	3		—
1990	7		133.3%
2000	16		128.6%
2010	8		−50.0%
2020	9		12.5%
U.S. Decennial Census

As of the census of 2000, there were 16 people, 6 households, and 4 families residing in the town. The population density was 0.4 people per square mile (0.1/km^{2}). There were 11 housing units at an average density of 0.2 per square mile (0.1/km^{2}). The racial makeup of the town was 93.75% White and 6.25% from two or more races.

There were 6 households, out of which 33.3% had children under the age of 18 living with them, 66.7% were married couples living together, 16.7% had a female householder with no husband present, and 16.7% were non-families. No households were made up of individuals. The average household size was 2.67 and the average family size was 2.60.

In the town, the population was spread out, with 25.0% under the age of 18, 6.3% from 18 to 24, 18.8% from 25 to 44, and 50.0% from 45 to 64. The median age was 46 years. For every 100 females, there were 77.8 males. For every 100 females age 18 and over, there were 71.4 males.

The median income for a household in the town was $14,583, and the median income for a family was $14,583. Males had a median income of $56,250 versus $0 for females. The per capita income for the town was $15,436. None of the population was below the poverty line.
