= Vermont Wilderness Act of 1984 =

1984 U.S. federal law

- Other short titles: Vermont Wilderness Act
- Long title: A bill to designate certain National Forest System lands in the State of Vermont for inclusion in the National Wilderness Preservation System and to designate a National Recreation Area.
- Enacted by: the 98th United States Congress
- Effective: June 19, 1984

Citations
- Public law: 98-322
- Statutes at Large: 98 Stat. 253

Legislative history
- Introduced in the House by Jim Jeffords (R–VT) on October 24, 1983; Passed the House on November 15, 1983 (passed); Passed the Senate on May 24, 1984 (passed) with amendment; House agreed to Senate amendment on June 4, 1984 (agreed); Signed into law by President Ronald Reagan on June 19, 1984

The Vermont Wilderness Act of 1984 (Pub. L. 98–322, 98 Stat. 253) was signed into law by President Ronald Reagan on June 19, 1984. The Act designated four new wilderness areas in the U.S. state of Vermont, while expanding one existing wilderness area. A total of 41,260 acres (16,700 ha) of new wilderness was created, all in the Green Mountain National Forest, and a new National Recreation Area was established.

New Wilderness Areas
	Approximate area	
	acres	ha
Breadloaf Wilderness	21,480	8,690
Big Branch Wilderness	6,720	2,720
Peru Peak Wilderness	6,920	2,800
George D. Aiken Wilderness	5,060	2,050

The Act added 1,080 acres (440 ha) to the Lye Brook Wilderness, (which had been created by the Eastern Wilderness Areas Act of 1975), and created the White Rocks National Recreation Area in the Green Mountain National Forest. This new recreation area, which included both the Big Branch Wilderness and Peru Peak Wilderness, consisted of 36,400 acres (14,700 ha). The Vermont Wilderness Act was one of a number of federal Wildnerness Acts signed in 1984 which established and expanded wilderness areas in different states, including the Washington, Oregon and California Wilderness Acts.

== See also ==
- List of U.S. Wilderness Areas
- Wilderness Act
- New England Wilderness Act of 2006
