= Joseph Battell =

Publisher and philanthropist (1839-1915)

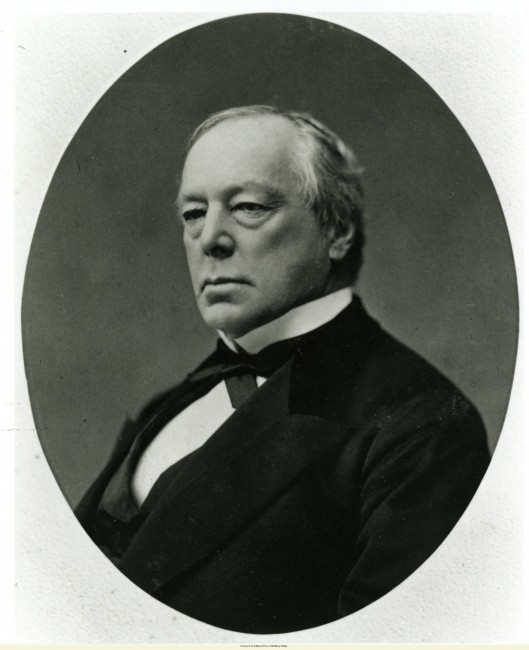
- Battell as Middlebury College trustee, circa 1900
- Born: July 15, 1839; Middlebury, Vermont, US
- Died: February 23, 1915 (aged 75); Washington, DC, US
- Resting place: Middlebury Cemetery, Middlebury, Vermont
- Occupation: Publisher
- Writing career
- Language: English

Joseph Battell (July 15, 1839 – February 23, 1915) was an American publisher and philanthropist from Middlebury, Vermont. Battell is credited with preserving Vermont forest land including the land for Camel's Hump State Park. The Joseph Battell Wilderness in the Green Mountain National Forest bears his name.

Battell attended Middlebury College in the early 1860s but he was forced to abandon his studies due to ill health. On the advice of his doctor, Battell spent a weekend at a farmhouse in nearby Ripton where the clear mountain air would help cure his ailing lungs.

He so loved the beauty of the surrounding hills that he decided to buy the farmhouse, which became known as the Bread Loaf Inn, named for Bread Loaf Mountain not far away. Over the years, numerous new buildings, porches, and barns were added in order to accommodate Battell's many friends and guests. The Inn and the surrounding mountains served as Battell's home and sanctuary for the rest of his long life.

Over the years, Battell purchased over 30,000 acres (121 km^{2}) of forest land within and beyond the view of the Bread Loaf Inn. At his death in 1915, he was the state's largest individual landowner.

Battell owned and edited a newspaper, the Middlebury Register, and authored several books, including the "American Morgan Horse Register." In addition, he served at the Vermont Legislature and as a trustee for Middlebury College.

Battell is the author of the book, Ellen--or the Whisperings of an Old Pine, published in 1903. The book is a dialogue between a sixteen-year-old girl, Ellen, and a wise old white pine tree. Among the matters they discuss is a refutation of the wave theory of sound propagation. It is illustrated with many photographs of Vermont scenery, including several of Ellen. Her mountain, Mount Ellen, a 4000-footer partially enclosed within the Sugarbush ski area, can be found at 44.160147°N 72.929307°W.

He donated his horse farm to the federal Morgan horse breeding program, and is credited by some as saving the breed. The Morgan horse farm, operated by the University of Vermont since 1951, remains operational in 2019. In addition to its role in promoting the breed, the farm produced Morgan hoses for use as cavalry mounts by the US Army in World War I and other conflicts.

== Philanthropy ==
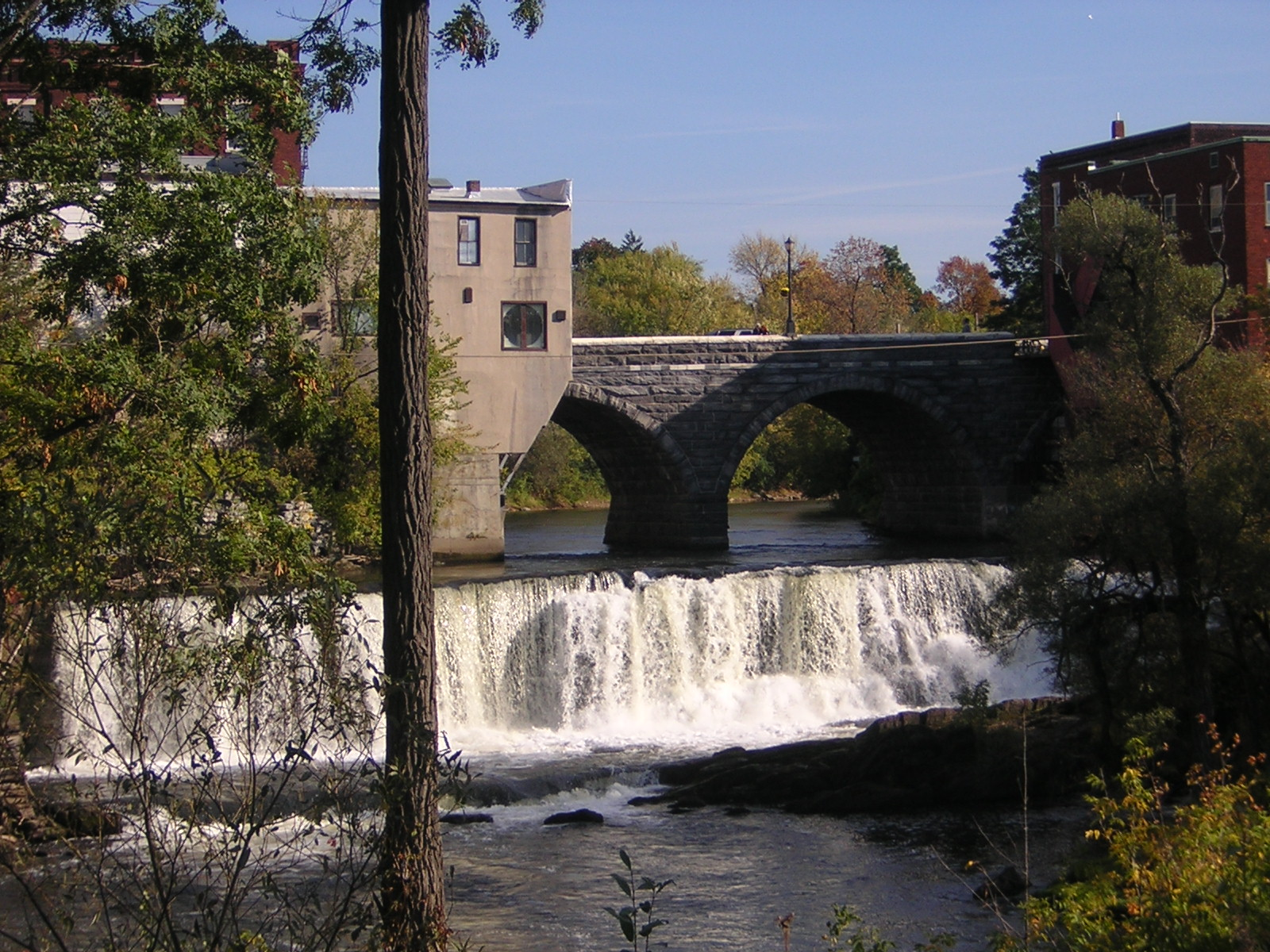
Battell Bridge over Otter Creek in downtown Middlebury, was built, partially financed, and named for Joseph Battell

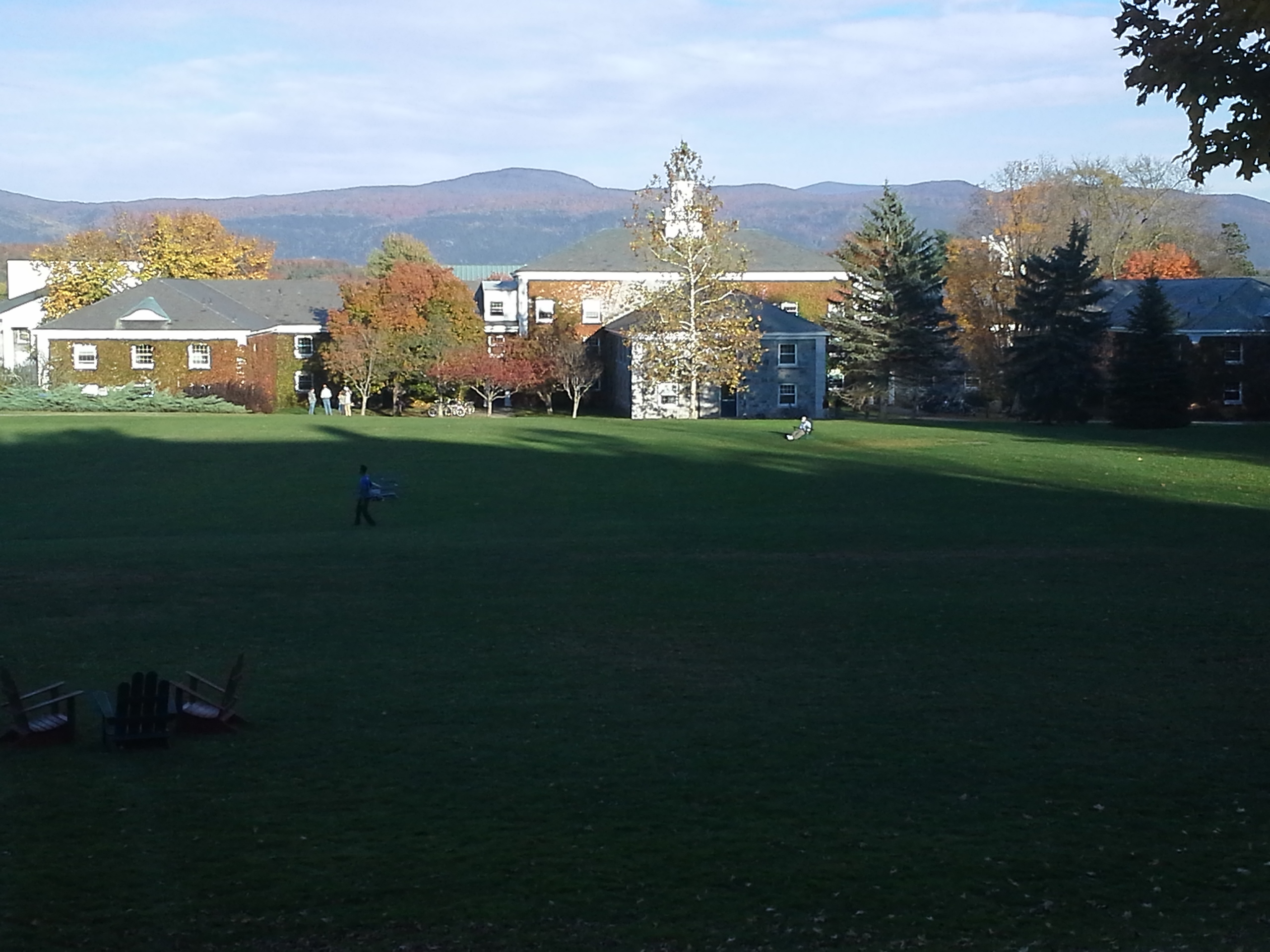
Battell Hall at Middlebury College, was named for Battell in recognition for the land he gave to the college

Battell left nearly all of his land holdings in trust as "wild lands" to "the citizens of the State of Vermont and the visitors within her borders." In a deed dated 24 January 1911, Battell sold (for one dollar) approximately 1,200 acres (4.9 km^{2}) of virgin forest, including the summit of Camel's Hump, to the State of Vermont. The deed declared that "trees growing on the land herein conveyed are not to be cut...and the whole forest is to be preserved in a primeval state." In effect, Battell had created Vermont’s first natural area strictly protected for its wilderness character.

Four years later, through his last will and testament, Battell substantially added to his legacy by placing over 30,000 acres (121 km^{2}) of Vermont's mountain forests in perpetual trust as "wild lands." Of these, more than 25,000 acres (101 km^{2}) surrounding the Bread Loaf Inn (including the Inn itself) were left to Middlebury College, while another 5,000 acres (20.2 km^{2}) on the neighboring ridge from Mount Ellen to Mount Abraham were willed to the United States Government for a National Park. Since the federal government declined Battell’s gift, the latter tract of mountain forest went to Middlebury College as well.

In his will, Battell directed the trustees as follows:

And it shall be the duty of said trustees to preserve as far as reasonably may be the forests of said park, and neither to cut nor permit to be cut thereon any trees whatsoever...to preserve intact said wild lands...as a specimen of the original Vermont forest.

Middlebury College sold almost 20,000 acres (80.9 km^{2}) of the Battell lands to the U.S. Forest Service in the 1930s plus another 10,000 acres (40.5 km^{2}) to the agency in the 1950s (while retaining the land surrounding the Bread Loaf Inn and the Snow Bowl). Eventually these land acquisitions allowed the Forest Service to create the northern unit of the Green Mountain National Forest. In particular, the Breadloaf Wilderness and the Joseph Battell Wilderness, created in 1984 and 2006, respectively, include much of the land gifted by Battell in 1915.

Battell Hall, a dormitory at Middlebury College, is named for Battell in recognition of the land he bequeathed to the college. A stone bridge in downtown Middlebury that Battell built in 1893 is also named in his honor. Battell's stone bridge replaced a wooden one that had burned down in 1891.
