= Glastenbury Wilderness =

Protected area in Vermont, United States

- IUCN category Ib (wilderness area)
- Location within Vermont Location within the United States
- Location: Bennington County, Vermont, US
- Nearest city: Bennington, Vermont
- Coordinates: 42°58′N 73°06′W
- Area: 22,400 acres (9,100 ha)
- Established: 2006
- Governing body: United States Forest Service

The Glastenbury Wilderness is one of eight wilderness areas in the Green Mountain National Forest in the U.S. state of Vermont. The area, located northeast of Bennington, Vermont, is managed by the U.S. Forest Service. With a total of 22,330 acres (9,040 ha), the wilderness is the second largest in Vermont (next to the Breadloaf Wilderness). It was created by the New England Wilderness Act of 2006.

The Long Trail (which coincides with the Appalachian Trail in this region) crosses the entire length of the wilderness from south to north. The wilderness is traversed by several other hiking trails including the Bald Mountain Trail, the West Ridge Trail, and the Little Pond Trail.

The hilly terrain of the area includes several summits surpassing 2,000 feet (610 m) in elevation. The highest peak is Glastenbury Mountain at 3,748 feet (1,142 m), which is located at the north end of the wilderness, although the actual summit is just outside its boundary.

== See also ==
- List of largest wilderness areas in the United States
- List of wilderness areas of the United States
- National Wilderness Preservation System
- Wilderness Act
