= Middlebury Gap =

- Interactive map of Middlebury Gap
- Elevation: 2,144 ft (653 m)
- Traversed by: Vermont Route 125

Location
- Location: Hancock, Addison County, Vermont, United States
- Range: Green Mountains
- Coordinates: 43°56.19′N 72°56.98′W
- Topo map: USGS Bread Loaf

Middlebury Gap, is a mountain pass in the Green Mountains of Vermont, USA. The height of land of the pass is located in Addison County.

On the southeast side of the height of land, the notch is drained by the Robbins Branch, thence into the Hancock Branch of the White River, which drains into the Connecticut River, and into Long Island Sound in Connecticut. To the northwest, the notch is the source of the South Branch of the Middlebury River, which drains into Otter Creek, and into Lake Champlain. Lake Champlain drains into the Richelieu River in Québec, thence into the Saint Lawrence River, and into the Gulf of Saint Lawrence.

The Long Trail, a 272-mile (438-km) hiking trail running the length of Vermont, crosses Middlebury Gap between 3,234-foot (986 m) Worth Mountain, 2 mi (3 km) to the south, and 3,323-foot (1,013 m) Boyce Mountain, 2.5 mi (4 km) to the north.

The Breadloaf Wilderness lies north of Middlebury Gap to Lincoln Gap. The Middlebury College Snow Bowl is just south of the gap, and beyond that is the Joseph Battell Wilderness.
