= Long Trail State Forest =

State Forest in Franklin, Lamoille, and Orleans counties, Vermont

- Interactive map of Long Trail State Forest
- Type: State forest
- Location: Vermont
- Coordinates: 44.7040°N 72.6806°W
- Area: 9,529 acres (38.56 km^{2})
- Created: 1996
- Operator: Vermont Department of Forests, Parks, and Recreation
- Website: Website

Long Trail State Forest protects 9,529 acres (38.56 km^{2}) around a portion of the Long Trail, a 271 miles (436 km) hiking trail in Vermont. The forest runs through Belvidere, Eden, Lowell, Johnson, Montgomery, Waterville and Westfield in Franklin, Lamoille and Orleans counties. The forest is managed by the Vermont Department of Forests, Parks, and Recreation in partnership with the Green Mountain Club.
