= Ashley Karst National Recreation and Geologic Area =

USFS National Recreation Area in northeastern Utah, United States

Coordinates: 40.688°N 109.802°W

- Interactive map of Ashley Karst National Recreation and Geologic Area
- Location: Uintah County, Utah, United States
- Nearest city: Vernal, Utah
- Area: 173,475 acres (70,203 ha)
- Established: March 12, 2019
- Governing body: U.S. Forest Service

The Ashley Karst National Recreation and Geologic Area (often abbreviated Ashley Karst NRGA) is a National Recreation Area in the eastern Uinta Mountains in northeastern Utah, United States. Created by Congress in 2019 and administered by the United States Forest Service as part of the Ashley National Forest, the designation aims to conserve the area’s karst aquifer and headwater streams, as well as geological, recreational, ecological scenic, and cultural resources. It is approximately 173,475 acres (702.03 km^{2}) in size just northwest of Vernal, Utah.

== History ==
Congress established the NRGA on March 12, 2019, in Section 1117 of the John D. Dingell Jr. Conservation, Management, and Recreation Act. In a related provision (Section 1123), the same law directed the conveyance of about 791 acres (3.20 km^{2}) at Ashley Springs to Uintah County. The area is managed as open space to protect the watershed and underground karst geology. The statute prohibits mining, new roads, and limits use to non-motorized public recreation on the conveyed land. Local and state officials supported the protections because Ashley Spring is the principal municipal water source for the Ashley Valley communities around Vernal.

== Geography ==
The NRGA lies entirely within Uintah County, Utah, on the south slope of the Uinta Mountains within the Ashley National Forest’s Vernal Ranger District. It extends from the county’s western boundary eastward roughly to the divide of the Ashley Creek drainage, then follows Taylor Mountain Road to the forest’s southern boundary. The landscape includes high forested benches and limestone canyons such as Ashley Gorge.

== Geology ==
The area is underlain by soluble Mississippian limestones that form a classic karst terrain of sinkholes, underground drainage, and caves. Notable features include Big Brush Creek Cave and Little Brush Creek Cave, high on the forest’s south slope; both are known for seasonal ice formations and complex subterranean passages that capture surface flow from Brush Creek. Groundwater traveling through the karst system feeds large springs, including Ashley Spring, which supplies municipal water to the Ashley Valley. During high-turbidity periods, nearby Red Fleet Reservoir supplements that supply.

== Recreation ==
The NRGA supports dispersed recreation typical of backcountry national forest lands, including hiking, camping, hunting, fishing, wildlife viewing, and winter travel. Caves in the vicinity are largely undeveloped and hazardous. Whiterocks Cave (on the west side of the area) is gated and accessible only on Forest Service–led guided tours allocated by lottery during summer. Motorized use is limited to designated roads and routes; no new roads may be constructed within the NRGA.

== Ecology ==
Vegetation zones transition from sagebrush meadows and pinyon–juniper at lower elevations to aspen, lodgepole pine, and spruce–fir on higher benches and slopes, with riparian meadows around springs and streams that support diverse wildlife. Protection of the intact headwaters and karst aquifer is a central management objective because these ecosystems sustain downstream municipal and ecological water needs.

== Management ==
The NRGA is administered by the U.S. Forest Service under the laws applicable to the National Forest System and the site’s enabling legislation. The Act requires preparation of a management plan in consultation with Uintah County and affected tribes and with public input; limits motorized use to designated routes; prohibits new road construction; withdraws all federal lands in the NRGA from mineral entry and leasing; allows existing grazing where established; preserves state jurisdiction over fish and wildlife; and does not create federal reserved water rights. Forest planning documents and project notices specific to the NRGA are maintained by the Ashley National Forest.

== See also ==
- Ashley National Forest
- High Uintas Wilderness
- Flaming Gorge National Recreation Area
