= Chaos Canyon =

Geological feature in Vermont, US

Coordinates: 43.4487115°N 73.0172405°W

Chaos Canyon is the name of a cleft in a giant quartzite rockslide in the White Rocks National Recreation Area located in southcentral Vermont, US. The rockslide was formed more than 10,000 years ago when the west slope of White Rocks Peak, part of the Green Mountain range, gave way due to intense frost action. The wooded canyon can be viewed from the White Rocks vista overlook off the WRNRA Ice Beds Trail.
