= New England Wilderness Act of 2006 =

2006 US federal law

- Other short titles: New England Wilderness Act
- Long title: A bill to designate certain land in New England as wilderness for inclusion in the National Preservation system and certain land as a National Recreation Area, and for other purposes.
- Enacted by: the 109th United States Congress
- Effective: December 1, 2006

Citations
- Public law: 109-382

Legislative history
- Introduced in the Senate by John E. Sununu (R–NH) on September 29, 2006; Passed the Senate on September 29, 2006 (passed); Passed the House on November 15, 2006 (passed); Signed into law by President George W. Bush on December 1, 2006

The New England Wilderness Act of 2006 (Pub. L. 109–382 (text) (PDF)) was signed into law by President George W. Bush on December 1, 2006. The Act designated three (3) new wilderness areas in the U.S. states of New Hampshire and Vermont, while expanding five (5) existing wilderness areas across these two states. A total of 76,152 acres (30,818 ha) of new wilderness were created, in the White Mountain National Forest (in New Hampshire) and the Green Mountain National Forest (in Vermont). The Act also created a new recreation area in Vermont.

New Wilderness Areas
	Total area		State
	acres	ha	State
Wild River Wilderness	23,700	9,600	NH
Glastenbury Wilderness	22,425	9,075	VT
Joseph Battell Wilderness	12,333	4,991	VT

In addition to the new wilderness areas listed above, the Act expanded the existing wilderness areas list below:

Wilderness Area Expansion
	Additional area		State	Created by
	acres	ha	State	Created by
Sandwich Range Wilderness	10,800	4,400	NH	New Hampshire Wilderness Act of 1984
Breadloaf Wilderness	3,757	1,520	VT	Vermont Wilderness Act of 1984
Lye Brook Wilderness	2,338	946	VT	Eastern Wilderness Areas Act of 1975
Peru Peak Wilderness	752	304	VT	Vermont Wilderness Act of 1984
Big Branch Wilderness	47	19	VT	Vermont Wilderness Act of 1984

In addition to the wilderness areas listed above, the Act created the Moosalamoo National Recreation Area in the Green Mountain National Forest. This new recreation area consisted of 15,857 acres (6,417 ha).

== See also ==
- List of U.S. Wilderness Areas
- Wilderness Act
