= Lye Brook Wilderness =

Wilderness area in Vermont, United States

- IUCN category Ib (wilderness area)
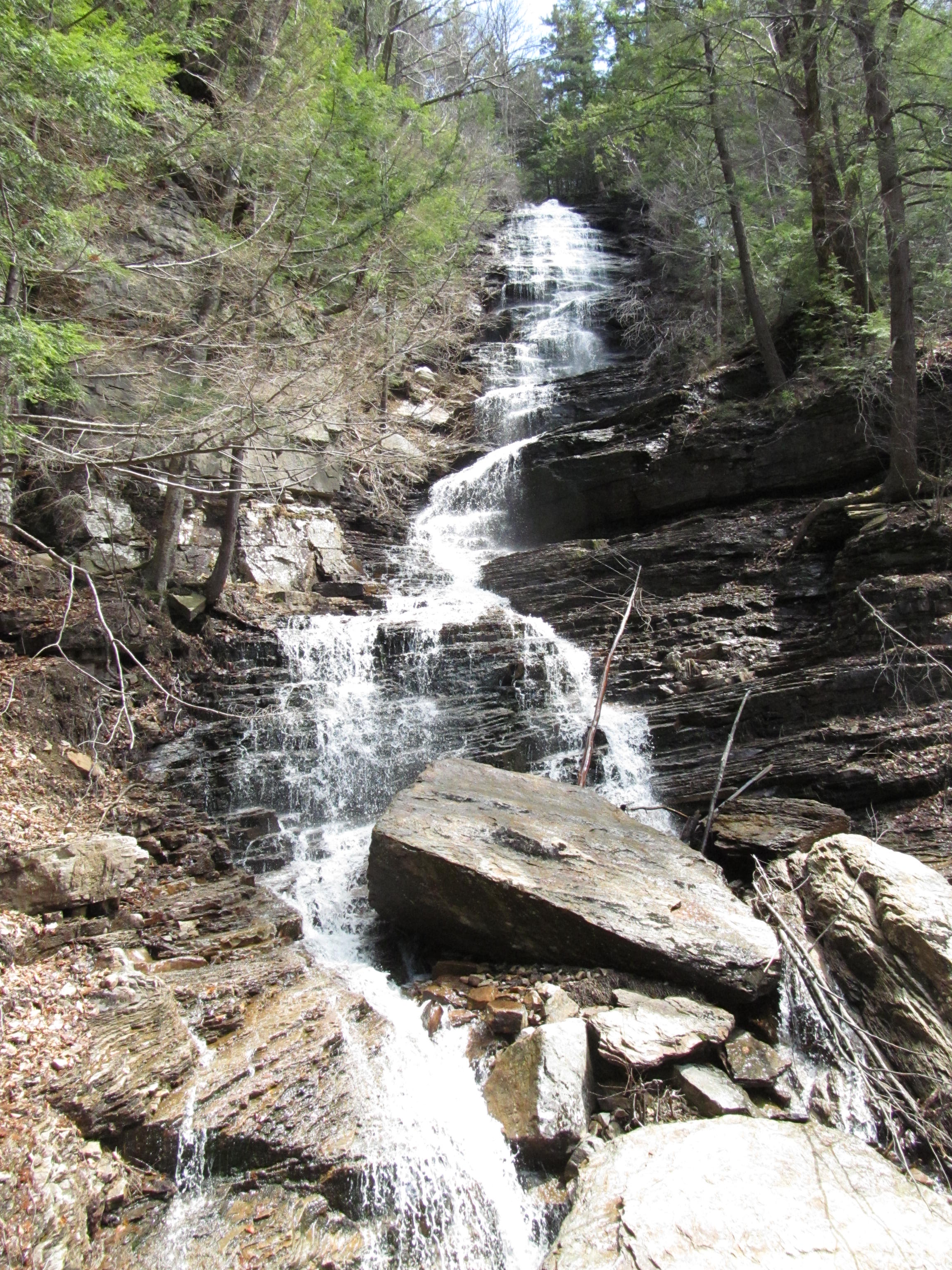
- Upper cascade of Lye Brook Falls

- Location within the United States
- Location: Bennington County and Windham County, Vermont, US
- Nearest city: Stratton, Vermont
- Coordinates: 43°06′47″N 73°01′46″W
- Area: 18,122 acres (7,334 ha)
- Established: 1975
- Governing body: United States Forest Service

The Lye Brook Wilderness is one of eight wilderness areas in the Green Mountain National Forest in the U.S. state of Vermont. It is managed by the U.S. Forest Service. The wilderness area was created by the Eastern Wilderness Areas Act of 1975, which makes it one of the oldest wilderness areas in the state. The area was expanded by both the Vermont Wilderness Act of 1984 and the New England Wilderness Act of 2006.

The Lye Brook Wilderness consists of 18,122 acres (7,334 ha) northwest of Stratton, Vermont. It is named after Lye Brook, which flows through the western half of the wilderness. Elevation within the wilderness ranges from 900 feet (274 m) to 2,900 feet (884 m) above sea level, though most of the area sits on a high plateau above 2,500 feet (762 m).

The Long Trail enters the wilderness area at Stratton Pond, crossing its eastern flank from south to north. The wilderness is traversed by several other hiking trails including the Branch Pond Trail and the Lye Brook Trail. The latter leads to Lye Brook Falls, a waterfall 125 feet (38 m) high, one of the highest waterfalls in Vermont.

Approximately 80% of Lye Brook Wilderness is forested with northern hardwoods such as birch, beech, and maple trees, though some thickets of small spruce dot the area as well. A variety of wildlife inhabit the area, including black bear, moose, deer, pine marten, bobcat, and various bird species. Hikers have observed over 80 species of animals, plants, and fungi.

== See also ==
- List of largest wilderness areas in the United States
- List of wilderness areas of the United States
- National Wilderness Preservation System
- Wilderness Act
