= Joseph Battell Wilderness =

Wilderness area in Vermont, United States

- Location within the United States
- Location: Addison County, Vermont, U.S.
- Nearest city: Brandon, Vermont
- Coordinates: 43°54′N 72°58′W
- Area: 12,336 acres (4,992 ha)
- Established: 2006
- Governing body: United States Forest Service

The Joseph Battell Wilderness is one of eight wilderness areas in the Green Mountain National Forest in the U.S. state of Vermont. The wilderness area, created by the New England Wilderness Act of 2006, is named in honor of Joseph Battell (1839–1915), a philanthropist and environmentalist from Middlebury, Vermont. The wilderness consists of 12,336 acres (4,992 ha) managed by the U.S. Forest Service.

There are numerous mountains in the area with altitudes of at least 3,000 ft (910 m), including (from south to north to east): the Great Cliffs (3,000 ft or 910 m), Mount Horrid (3,216 ft or 980 m), Cape Lookoff Mountain (3,320 ft or 1,010 m), Gillespie Peak (3,366 ft or 1,026 m), Romance Mountain (3,145 ft or 959 m), Worth Mountain (3,234 ft or 986 m), Monastery Mountain (3,224 ft or 983 m), and Philadelphia Peak (3,203 ft or 976 m). The core of the area, from Monastery Mountain to Worth Mountain to Romance Mountain, was bequeathed as a "park" to Middlebury College by Battell in 1915. Middlebury College sold nearly all of Battell's lands to the Forest Service in the 1930s and 1950s. It was the sale of these lands that prompted the Federal government to create the northern unit of the Green Mountain National Forest.

The Long Trail crosses the entire length of the Joseph Battell Wilderness from Brandon Gap on its south edge to Middlebury Gap on its north edge. The wilderness is traversed by several other hiking trails including the Sucker Brook Trail.

== See also ==
- List of wilderness areas of the United States
- National Wilderness Preservation System
- Wilderness Act
