= Moosalamoo National Recreation Area =

Protected area in Vermont, US

- Location within the United States
- Location: Addison County, Vermont, United States
- Nearest city: Goshen, Vermont
- Coordinates: 43°55′00″N 73°01′00″W
- Area: 15,875 acres (64.24 km^{2})
- Established: 2007
- Governing body: United States Forest Service
- Website: Moosalamoo National Recreation Area

Moosalamoo National Recreation Area is one of two national recreation areas in the Green Mountain National Forest in the U.S. state of Vermont. The recreation area is located between Middlebury and Brandon in the northern half of the Green Mountain National Forest. The area consists of 15,875 acres (6,424 ha) surrounding Mount Moosalamoo.

The Moosalamoo National Recreation Area was created by the New England Wilderness Act of 2006. The area is administered by the U.S. Forest Service.
