= George D. Aiken Wilderness =

Protected area in Vermont, United States

- IUCN category Ib (wilderness area)
- Location within Vermont Location within the United States
- Location: Bennington County, Vermont, USA
- Nearest city: Woodford, Vermont
- Coordinates: 42°52′N 73°03′W
- Area: 4,800 acres (1,900 ha)
- Established: 1984
- Governing body: United States Forest Service

The George D. Aiken Wilderness is one of eight wilderness areas in the Green Mountain National Forest in the U.S. state of Vermont. The wilderness area, created by the Vermont Wilderness Act of 1984, is named in honor of George Aiken (1892–1984), former U.S. Senator from Vermont who advocated for the passage of the Eastern Wilderness Areas Act of 1975. Today the George D. Aiken Wilderness consists of 4,800 acres (1,900 ha) managed by the U.S. Forest Service.

== See also ==
- List of largest wilderness areas in the United States
- List of wilderness areas of the United States
- National Wilderness Preservation System
- Wilderness Act
