= Peru Peak Wilderness =

Wilderness area in Vermont, United States

- Location within the United States
- Location: Bennington County and Rutland County, Vermont, US
- Nearest city: Peru, Vermont
- Coordinates: 43°18′N 72°56′W
- Area: 7,825 acres (3,167 ha)
- Established: 1984
- Governing body: United States Forest Service

The Peru Peak Wilderness is one of eight wilderness areas in the Green Mountain National Forest in the U.S. state of Vermont. It was created by the Vermont Wilderness Act of 1984 and later expanded by the New England Wilderness Act of 2006. A total of 7,825 acres (3,167 ha) are managed by the U.S. Forest Service.

The Long Trail (which coincides with the Appalachian Trail in this region) enters the wilderness at Mad Tom Notch on its southern edge, crossing over Styles Peak (3,394 ft or 1,034 m) and Peru Peak (3,429 ft or 1,045 m) before exiting the area on its western edge. The northern half of Peru Peak Wilderness is remote with no marked trails. In particular, Pete Parent Peak (2,961 ft or 903 m) has no marked path to the top.

== See also ==
- List of largest wilderness areas in the United States
- List of wilderness areas of the United States
- National Wilderness Preservation System
- Wilderness Act
- White Rocks National Recreation Area
