= Breadloaf Wilderness =

Protected area in Vermont, United States

- IUCN category Ib (wilderness area)
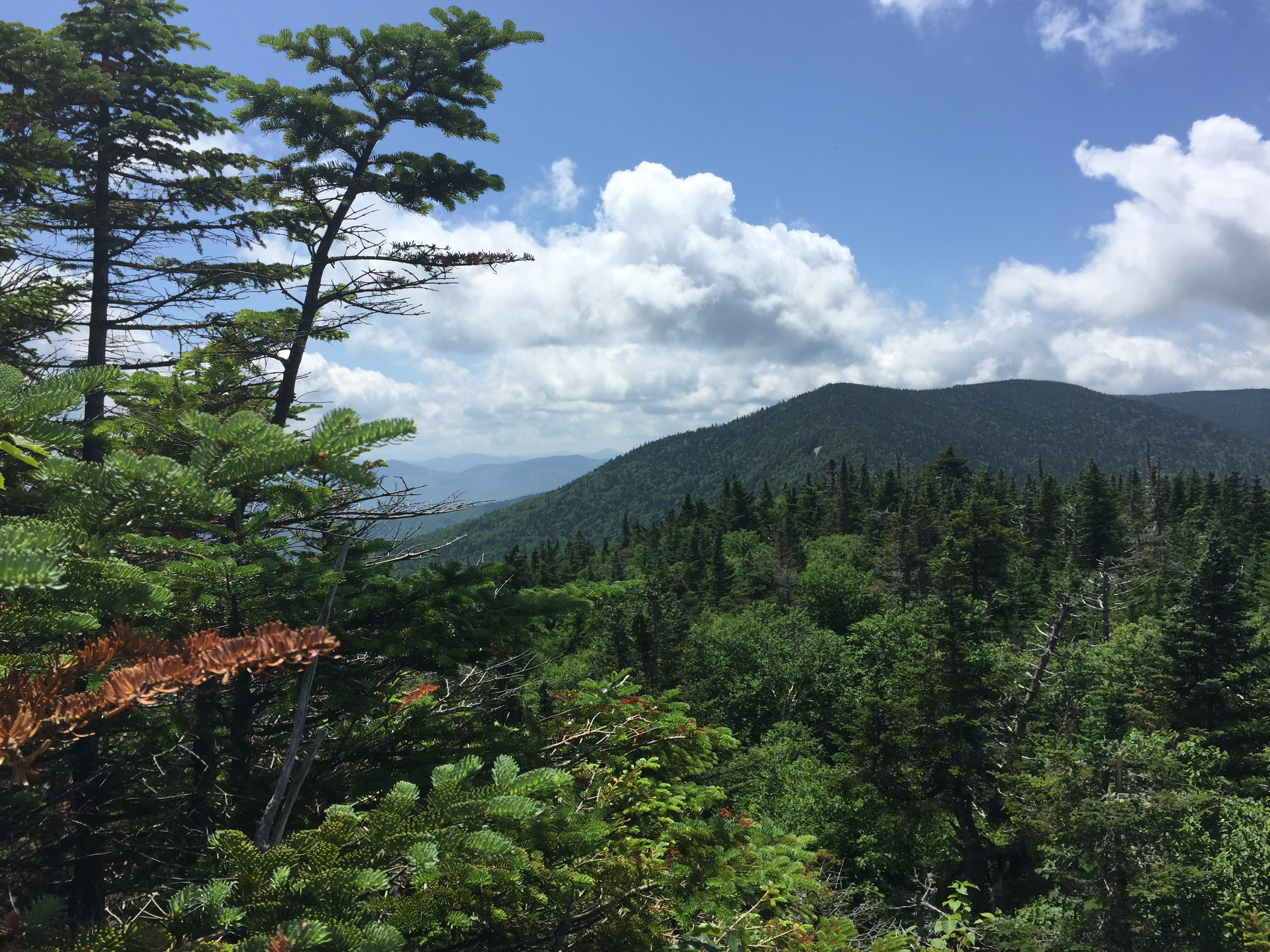
- A view from Killington View

- Location within Vermont Location within the United States
- Location: Addison County, Vermont, US
- Nearest city: Ripton, Vermont
- Coordinates: 44°01′N 72°55′W
- Area: 24,986 acres (10,111 ha)
- Established: 1984
- Governing body: United States Forest Service

The Breadloaf Wilderness is one of eight wilderness areas in the Green Mountain National Forest in the U.S. state of Vermont. It was created by the Vermont Wilderness Act of 1984 and later expanded by the New England Wilderness Act of 2006. With a total of 24,986 acres (10,111 ha), it is the largest wilderness area in Vermont. The area is managed by the U.S. Forest Service.

Roughly half of the Breadloaf Wilderness, from its southern boundary at Middlebury Gap to Mount Roosevelt in its interior, was bequeathed to Middlebury College by Joseph Battell (1839–1915), a philanthropist and environmentalist from Middlebury, Vermont, in 1915. The college sold nearly all of Battell's lands to the Forest Service in the 1930s and 1950s. It was the sale of these lands that prompted the Federal government to create the northern unit of the Green Mountain National Forest.

The Long Trail traverses 17.3 miles (27.8 km) through the heart of the Breadloaf Wilderness, from Middlebury Gap to Lincoln Gap at its northern edge. This section of the Long Trail crosses at least ten peaks above 3,000 feet (910 m), the highest of which is Bread Loaf Mountain at 3,835 feet (1,169 m). Additional access to the wilderness is provided by numerous side trails including (from south to north) the Burnt Hill Trail, the Skylight Pond Trail, the Emily Proctor Trail, the Clark Brook Trail, and the Cooley Glen Trail.

Numerous wildlife species thrive in the wilderness. Moose and black bear are said to be present in considerable numbers. Hikers have observed more than 100 forms of life, including at least 70 species of plants and 25 species of animals.

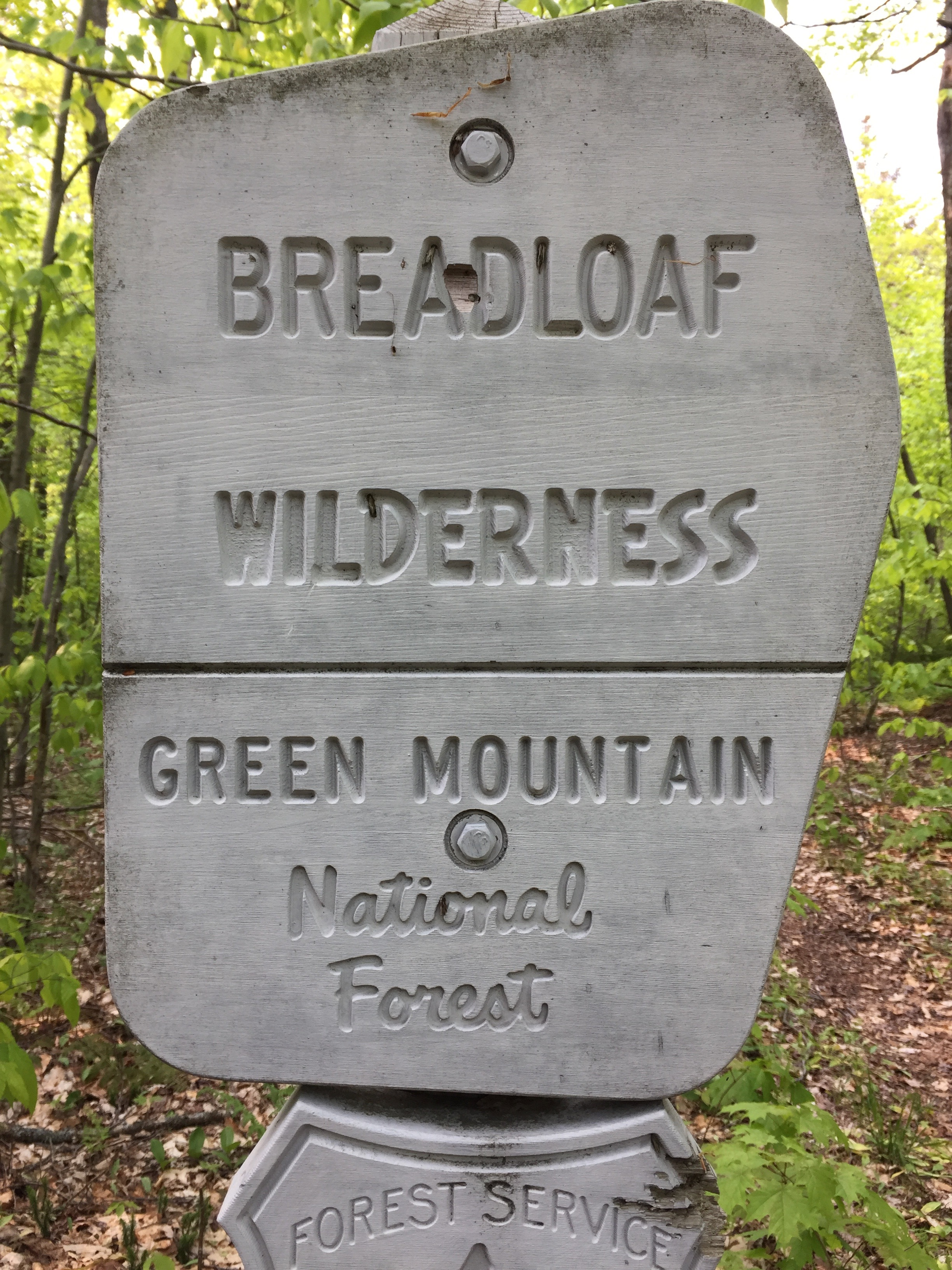
On the Emily Proctor Trail at the edge of the Breadloaf Wilderness in the Green Mountain National Forest

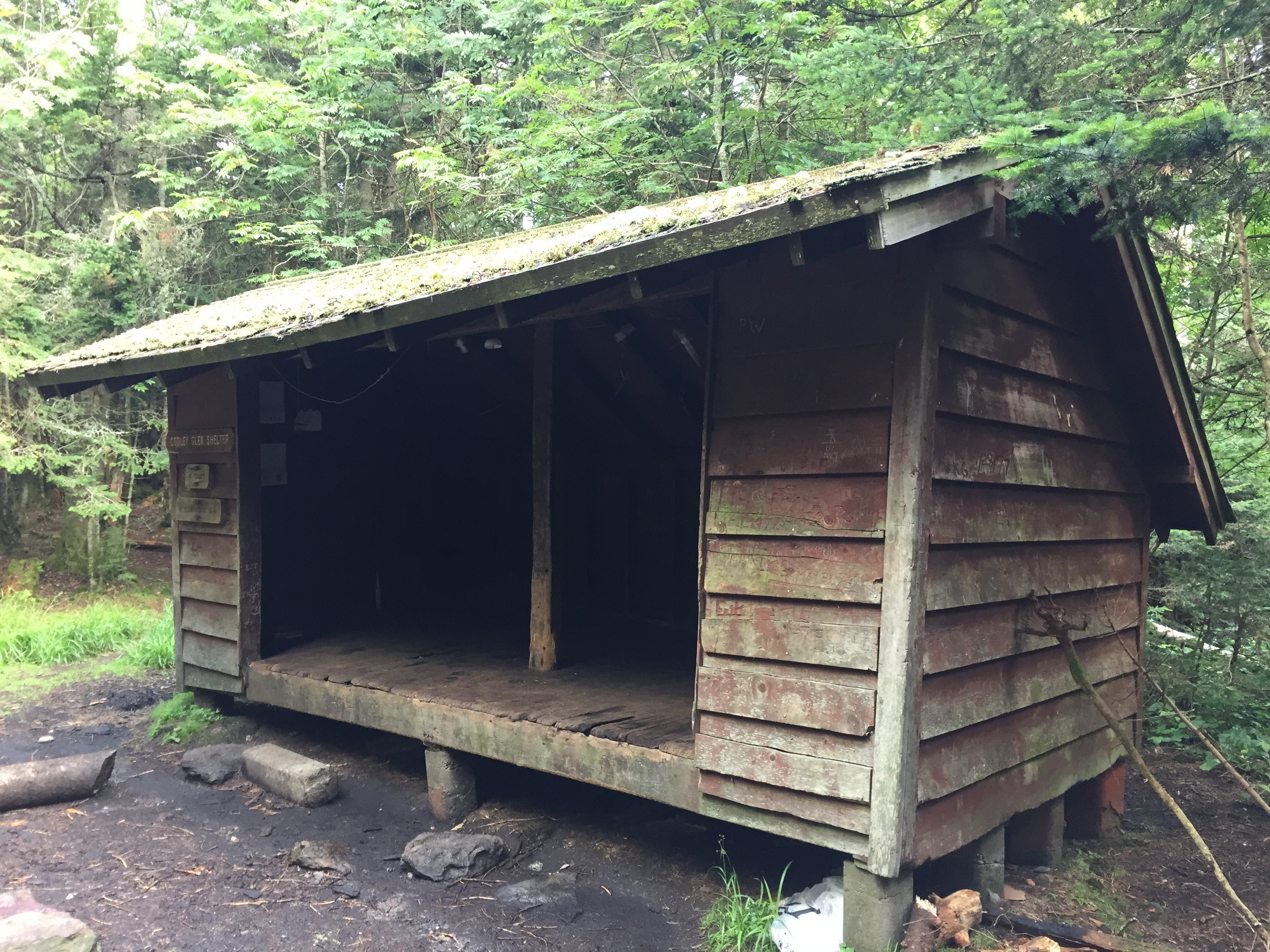
The Cooley Glen Shelter on the Long Trail in the Breadloaf Wilderness in the Green Mountain National Forest

== See also ==
- List of largest wilderness areas in the United States
- List of wilderness areas of the United States
- National Wilderness Preservation System
- Wilderness Act
