= Glastenbury Mountain =

Mountain in Vermont, United States

Highest point
- Elevation: 3,748 ft (1,142 m) NGVD 29
- Prominence: 1,108 ft (338 m)
- Coordinates: 42°58′41″N 73°04′16″W

Geography
- Location: Bennington County, Vermont, U.S.
- Parent range: Green Mountains
- Topo map: USGS Woodford

Glastenbury Mountain is a mountain located in Bennington County, Vermont, in the Green Mountain National Forest. The mountain is part of the Green Mountains.

The northeast side of Glastenbury Mountain drains into Deer Lick Brook, thence into the Glastenbury River, the Deerfield River, the Connecticut River, and into Long Island Sound in Connecticut. The southeast side of Glastenbury Mtn. drains into Deer Cabin Brook, and thence into the Glastenbury River. The southwest end of Glastenbury Mtn. drains into Bolles Brook, thence into the Roaring Branch of the Walloomsac River, the Hoosic River, the Hudson River, and into New York Bay in New York. The northwest side of Glastenbury drains into the Fayville Branch of Warm Brook, thence into Batten Kill and the Hudson River.

The Long Trail, a 272-mile (438-km) hiking trail running the length of Vermont, passes over the summit of Glastenbury Mountain. The summit of the mountain has an observation tower maintained by GMC, who also maintains the shelter three-tenths of a mile south of the summit. The Appalachian Trail, a 2,170-mile (3,500-km) National Scenic Trail from Georgia to Maine, coincides with this section of the Long Trail.

== See also ==
- List of mountains in Vermont
- Bennington Triangle
