= Big Branch Wilderness =

Protected area in Vermont, United States

- IUCN category Ib (wilderness area)
- Location within the United States
- Location: Bennington County and Rutland County, Vermont, US
- Nearest city: Danby, Vermont
- Coordinates: 43°19′N 72°57′W
- Area: 6,725 acres (2,722 ha)
- Established: 1984
- Governing body: United States Forest Service

The Big Branch Wilderness is one of eight wilderness areas in the Green Mountain National Forest in the U.S. state of Vermont. It was created by the Vermont Wilderness Act of 1984 and later expanded by the New England Wilderness Act of 2006. A total of 6,725 acres (2,722 ha) are managed by the U.S. Forest Service.

The Long Trail (which coincides with the Appalachian Trail in this region) crosses a portion of the wilderness from Griffith Lake at its eastern boundary to Ten Kilns Brook at its northern edge. The wilderness is traversed by several other hiking trails including the Griffith Lake Trail, Lake Trail, Baker Peak Trail, and the Old Job Trail.

There are several summits surpassing 2,500 feet (762 m) in elevation. The highest peak is Mount Tabor at 3,043 feet (928 m), which is located at the south end of the wilderness.

== See also ==
- List of largest wilderness areas in the United States
- List of wilderness areas of the United States
- National Wilderness Preservation System
- Wilderness Act
- White Rocks National Recreation Area
