= Mount Rogers Crest Zone =

Wildland in western Virginia, United States

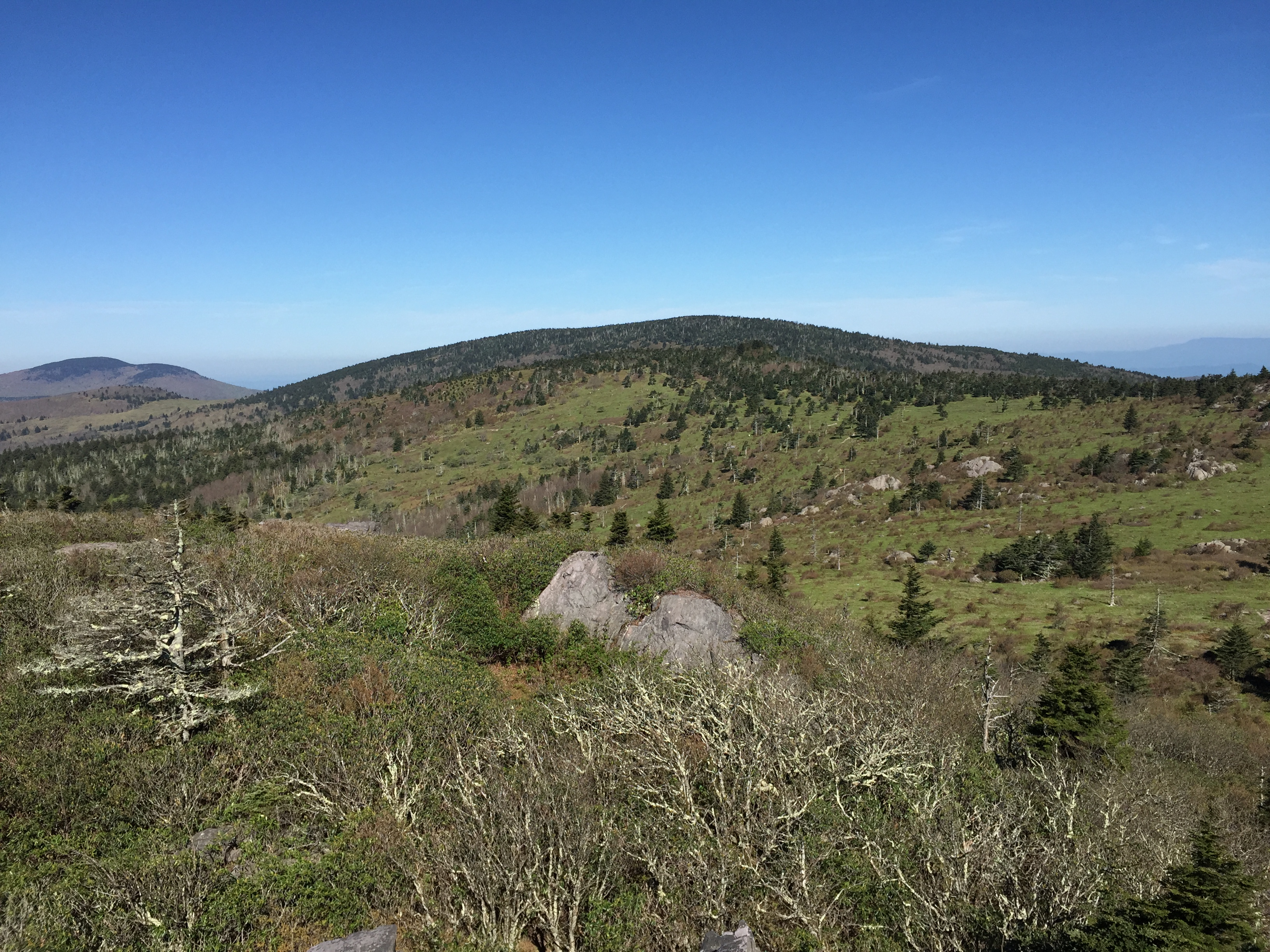
- View west-northwest towards Mount Rogers from the northern rocky outcrop along the Wilburn Ridge Trail

- Location within Virginia
- Location: Virginia, United States
- Coordinates: 36°39′13″N 81°30′5″W
- Area: 3,444 acres (13.94 km^{2})

Mount Rogers Crest Zone is a wildland in the George Washington and Jefferson National Forests of western Virginia that has been recognized by the Wilderness Society as a special place worthy of protection from logging and road construction. The Wilderness Society has designated the area as a "Mountain Treasure".

One of the most visited locations in the Mount Rogers National Recreation area, the Mount Rogers Crest Zone offers scenic views of nearby Rhododendron Gap and other high points, and a diversity of boreal species in lands surrounding Mount Rogers, the highest point in Virginia.

The area is part of the Mount Rogers Cluster.

== Location and access ==
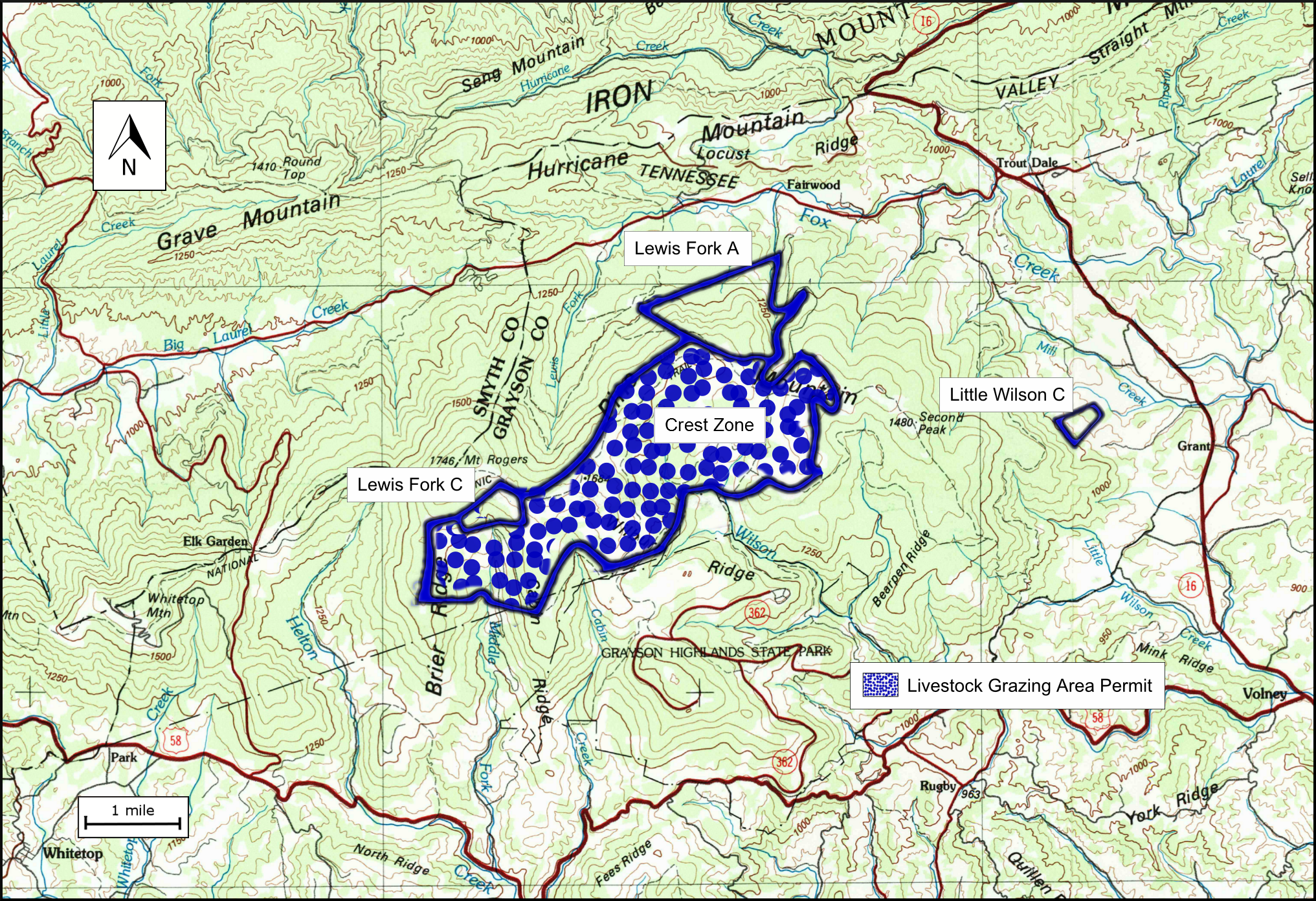
Boundary of the Mount Rogers Crest Zone wild area as identified by the Wilderness Society.

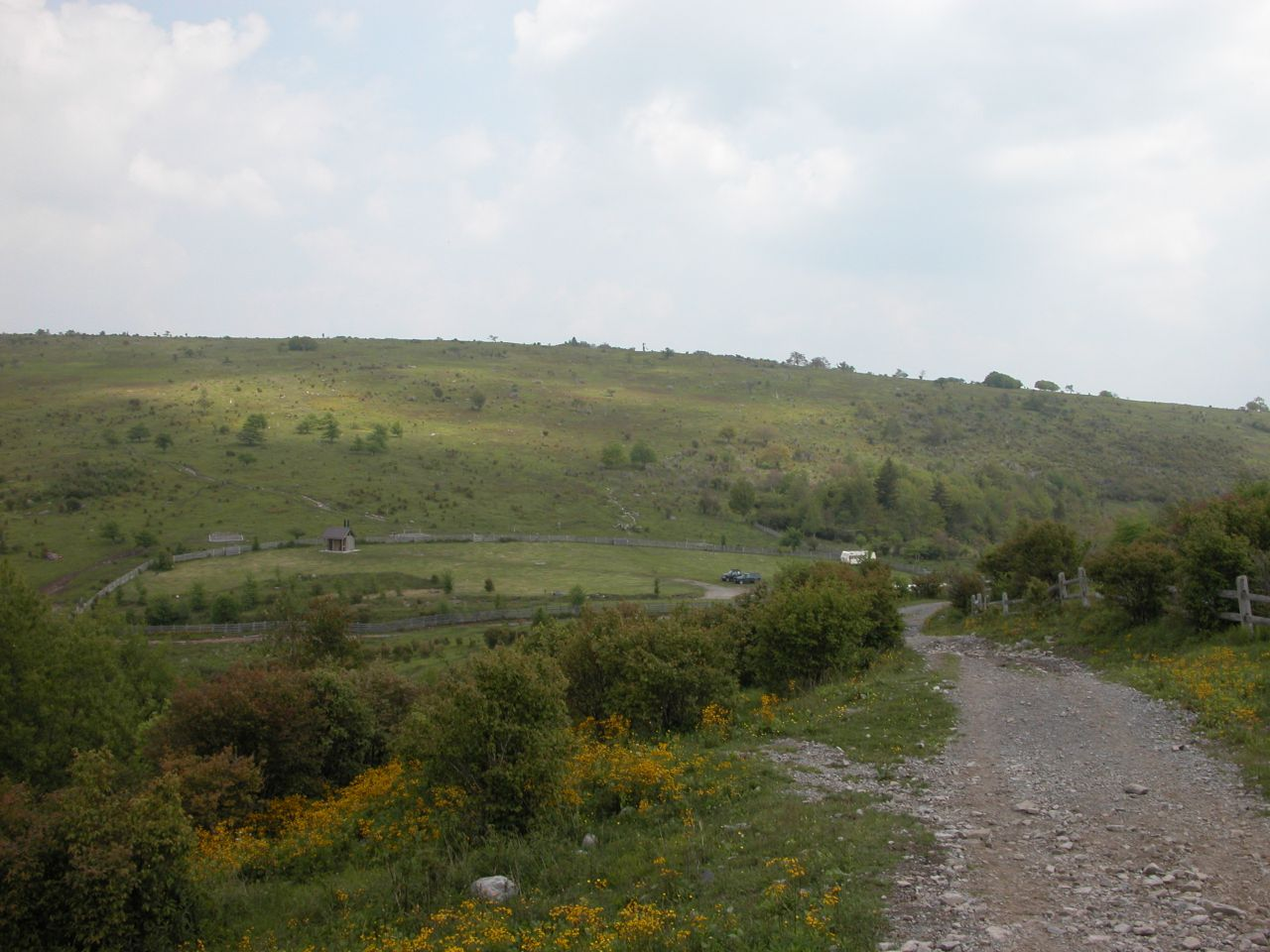
Scales from the Virginia Highlands Trail

The area is located in the Appalachian Mountains of Southwestern Virginia about 5 miles southwest of Troutdale, Virginia between the Lewis Fork Wilderness Area and the Little Wilson Creek Wilderness Area.

The Appalachian Trail passes through the area for about 6 miles as the trail goes between Lewis Fork Wilderness and Little Wilson Creek Wilderness.

Other trails into the area include:

- Virginia Highlands Horse Trail, Forest Service 337, 62.3 miles
- Old Orchard Trail, FS 4533A, 1.63 miles
- Old Orchard Spur Trail, FS 4596, 1.66 miles
- Wilburn Ridge Trail, FS 4597, 0.67 miles

Pine Mountain Road, Rt. 613, gives access to the Scales area on the north but is seasonally closed.

The boundary of the wildland as determined by the Wilderness Society is shown in the adjacent map. Additional roads and trails are given on National Geographic Maps 786 (Mount Rogers). and Map 318 (Mount Rogers High Country) A great variety of information, including topographic maps, aerial views, satellite data and weather information, is obtained by selecting the link with the wild land's coordinates in the upper right of this page.

Beyond maintained trails, old logging roads can be used to explore the area. The Appalachian Mountains were extensively timbered in the early twentieth century leaving logging roads that are becoming overgrown but still passable. Old logging roads and railroad grades can be located by consulting the historical topographic maps available from the United States Geological Survey (USGS). The Mount Rogers Crest Zone wild area is covered by USGS topographic maps Troutdale and Whitetop Mountain.

== Natural history ==
On the north side, with cool and wet colluvial drainages, the overstory is dominated by yellow poplar, northern red oak, white oak, basswood, cucumber tree, white ash, eastern hemlock and red maple. A significant northern hardwood forest community, between 4000- and 4800-feet elevation, is dominated by American beech, yellow birch, sugar maple, mountain maple and striped maple. Above 4200 feet red spruce is found throughout the area.

Although most of the timber is in the 21-100 year old age class, there are areas at high elevations where logging was limited by steep and rocky slopes. Here mature northern hardwood communities exist, a submesotrophic forest.

The area contains two rare plants, the Blue Ridge St. Johns wort and mountain rattle snake root, as well as rare sub-species of the northern flying squirrel. While the northern flying squirrel is relatively common, the subspecies is extremely rare and is listed as Federally endangered. There is some old growth forest on Brier Ridge.

Parts of Big Wilson Creek, Mount Rogers, and Pine Mountain special biological areas are found here. Unique aspects of these areas are Virginia’s largest high elevation peat bog, wetlands and seeps with rare herbs, birds and salamanders. It has a spot with one of the highest concentrations of rare species and significant plant communities in the state.

Five streams, Solomon Branch, Opossum Creek, Little Wilson Creek, Middle Fork of Helton Creek and Cabin Creek, are recognized for their water quality. Wild natural trout streams in Virginia are classified by the Department of Game and Inland Fisheries by their water quality, with class i the highest and class iv the lowest. Cabin Creek is a class i trout stream, the highest possible ranking, while the others are class ii streams.

== Topography ==
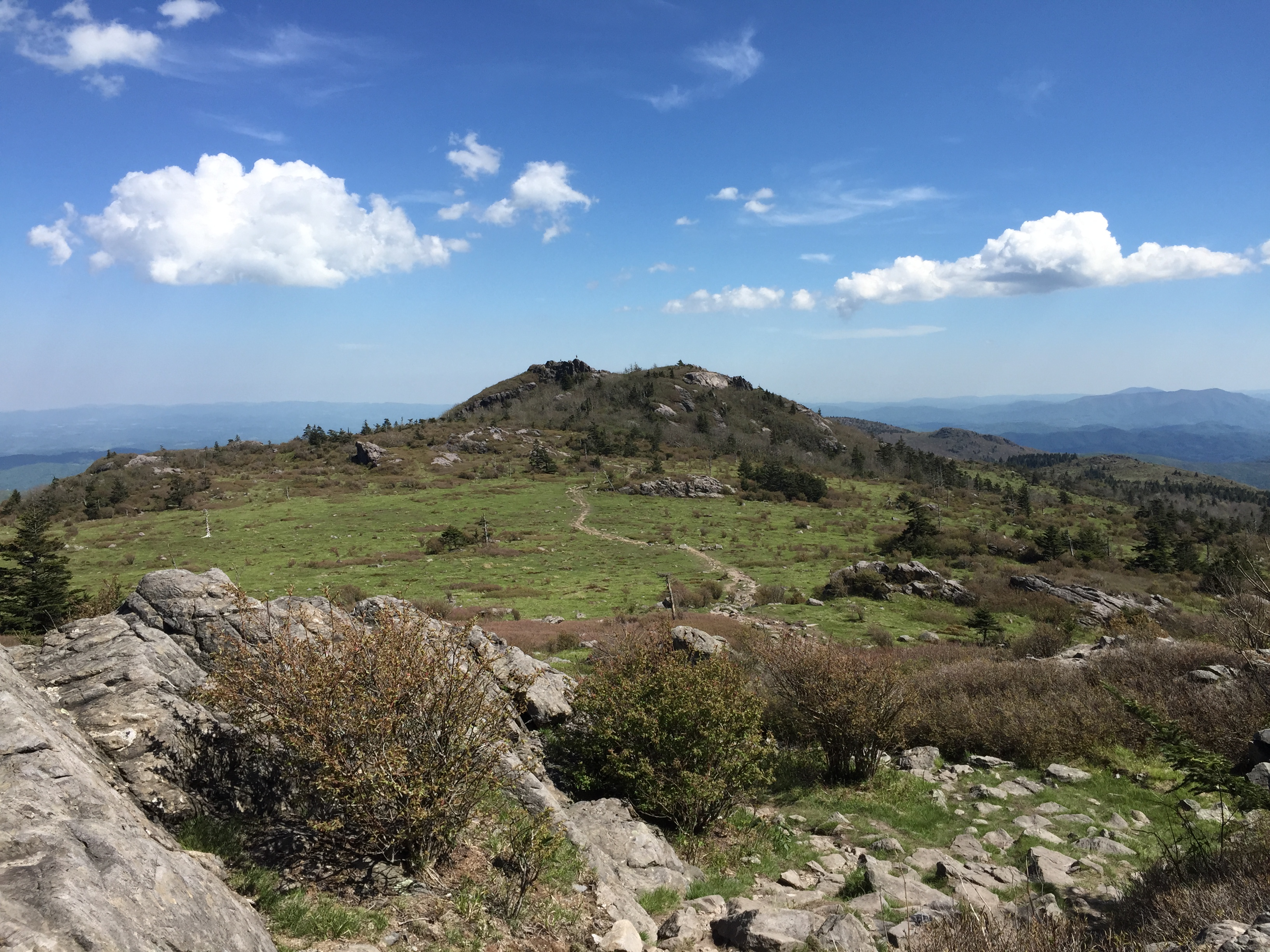
View southeast along Wilburn Ridge

As part of the Southern Blue Ridge Mountains Subsection within the Central Appalachian Broadleaf Coniferous Forest-Meadow Province, there are tectonic uplifted mountain ranges composed of igneous and metamorphic rock with many high gradient, deeply incised streams. Pine Mountain is a dominant peak in the area.

== Forest Service management ==
The original report by the Wilderness Society, published in 1999, included seven areas; Little Wilson Creek Addition A, 78 acres; Addition B, 1724 acres; Addition C, 60 acres; Lewis Fork Addition A, 600 acres; Addition B, 270 acres; and Addition C, 95 acres; as well as the Crest Zone Bald Management Area, 3444 acres. With adjacent Little Wilson Creek Wilderness, Lewis Fork Wilderness and Grayson Highlands, a contiguous environment is formed for expanded wilderness opportunities. With passage of the Omnibus Public Lands Act of 2009, Little Wilson Creek Additions A and B were added to the Little Wilson Creek Wilderness, and Lewis Fork Addition B was added to the Lewis Fork Wilderness leaving the additions considered here without the protection offered by wilderness designation.

The Forest Service has conducted a survey of their lands to determine the potential for wilderness designation. Wilderness designation provides a high degree of protection from development. The areas that were found suitable are referred to as inventoried roadless areas. Later a Roadless Rule was adopted that limited road construction in these areas. The rule provided some degree of protection by reducing the negative environmental impact of road construction and thus promoting the conservation of roadless areas. Except for Lewis Fork Addition A, the areas considered here were not inventoried in the roadless area review, and therefore not protected from possible road construction and timber sales.

Most of the area is managed as part of the "5100 acre Crest Zone Special Area" with 2200 acres of the Crest Zone designated as "open area management" that allows grazing, prescribed burning, mechanical cutting, and herbicides. Livestock grazing across 3661 acres of the Crest Zone (65%) was allowed by the Forest Service in 1997 with permits generally given from May 1 to October 31. In 2003 a new policy was adopted to monitor increasing demand. As a result, group size is limited to 10 persons across the entire High Country thus extending this restriction beyond the areas with wilderness designation. The use of horses and bicycles was restricted to designated trails; two trails and 64 backcountry campsites were closed; and camping was restricted to established sites. With the demands that horses place on soils and other resources, the surface of many horse trails have been hardened.

== Cultural history ==
A survey of cultural resources found two prehistoric sites, a basecamp and a transient camp.
