= Robert T. Stafford White Rocks National Recreation Area =

Protected area in Vermont, United States

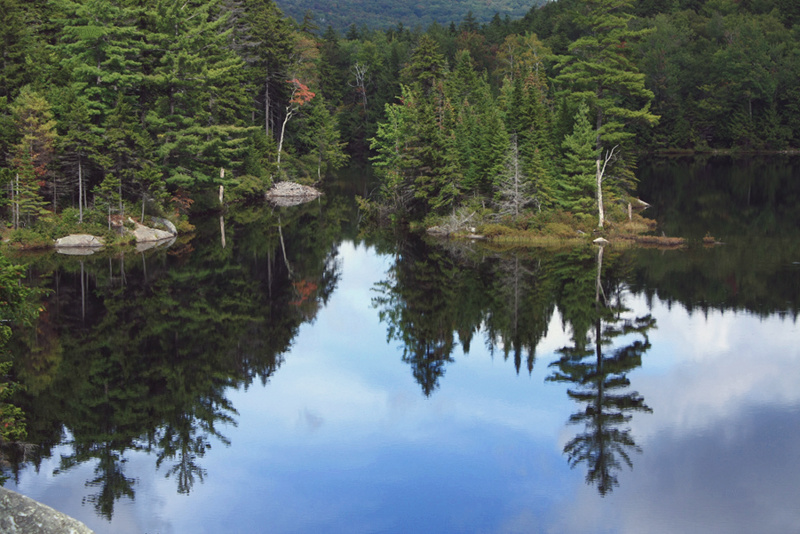
- Little Rock Pond

- Location within the United States Location within Vermont
- Location: Rutland / Bennington / Windsor counties, Vermont, United States
- Nearest city: Rutland, Vermont
- Coordinates: 43.3803502°N 72.9184355°W
- Area: 36,400 acres (14,700 ha)
- Established: June 19, 1984
- Governing body: United States Forest Service
- Website: White Rocks National Recreation Area

Robert T. Stafford White Rocks National Recreation Area is a United States National Recreation Area located in southern Vermont, United States, within the Green Mountain National Forest. Both the Peru Peak Wilderness and the Big Branch Wilderness areas are within the recreation area.

The White Rocks National Recreation Area was created by the Vermont Wilderness Act of 1984. On January 17, 2006 President George W. Bush signed Pub. L. 110–1 (text) (PDF), which renamed the park to the Robert T. Stafford White Rocks National Recreation Area, after Robert Stafford, former Governor of Vermont, United States Representative, and U.S. Senator.

Recreational activities include camping and hiking on a 30-mile (48 kilometer) section of the Appalachian Trail that traverses the recreation area. There are also 61 miles (97.6 kilometers) of maintained snowmobile trails within the recreation area. Chaos Canyon is a cleft in a giant quartzite rockslide in the Area.
