= Long Trail =

Hiking trail in U.S. state of Vermont

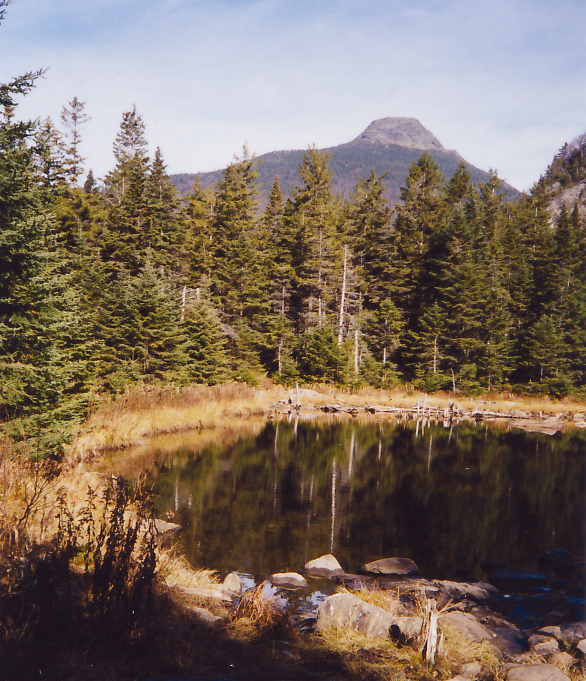
- Camel's Hump from the Long Trail
- Length: 273 mi (439 km)
- Location: Vermont, United States
- Use: Hiking, Snowshoeing
- Highest point: Mount Mansfield
- Lowest point: Winooski River at Jonesville
- Difficulty: Moderate to Strenuous
- Season: Late spring through late fall

The Long Trail is a hiking trail located in Vermont, running the length of the state. It is the oldest long-distance trail in the United States, constructed between 1910 and 1930 by the Green Mountain Club (GMC). The club remains the primary organization responsible for the trail, and is recognized by the state legislature as "the founder, sponsor, defender, and protector" of the Long Trail System. The Long Trail sees 410,000 people annually.

== History ==
The Long Trail was conceived in 1909 by James P. Taylor who was at the time the assistant headmaster of Vermont Academy in Saxtons River, Vermont. Taylor lobbied other Vermont residents who shared his dream of a mission to "make the Vermont mountains play a larger part in the life of the people by protecting and maintaining the Long Trail system and fostering, through education, the stewardship of Vermont's hiking trails and mountains". On March 11, 1910, Taylor and twenty-five others met at the Van Ness House in Burlington, Vermont for the first meeting of the Green Mountain Club In 1912, work began on the construction of America's first long-distance hiking path. The GMC completed the Long Trail in 1930.

== Geography ==
The Long Trail runs 273 miles (439 km) through the state of Vermont. It starts at the Massachusetts state line (at Clarksburg, Massachusetts), and runs north to the Canada–US border (in Jay, Vermont). It runs along the main ridge of the Green Mountains, coinciding with the Appalachian Trail (for which it served as the inspiration) for roughly 100 miles (160 km) in the southern third of the state. About 23 miles (37 km), from Maine Junction to Sucker Brook, coincide with the North Country National Scenic Trail. Additionally, over 175 miles (282 km) of side trails complete the Long Trail System.

The Long Trail passes through six of the eight wilderness areas in the Green Mountain National Forest, including (from south to north) Glastenbury Wilderness, Lye Brook Wilderness, Peru Peak Wilderness, Big Branch Wilderness, Joseph Battell Wilderness, and Breadloaf Wilderness. It traverses most of the major summits in the Green Mountains, including (from south to north) Glastenbury Mountain, Stratton Mountain, Killington Peak, Mount Abraham, Mount Ellen, Camel's Hump, Mount Mansfield, and Jay Peak.

== Maintenance ==
The Long Trail is maintained primarily by the Green Mountain Club and its volunteers. Twelve club sections maintain assigned sections of the Long Trail – two other club sections maintain the trails in Vermont's Northeast Kingdom and the Appalachian Trail from Maine Junction in Killington to the Connecticut River. Although roughly 1,000 volunteers perform most of the club's trail work, the club also employs a staff to handle day-to-day operations and a seasonal staff of summit caretakers and the Long Trail Patrol which works on heavy duty projects on the trail. The Green Mountain Club also receives assistance from the Vermont Department of Forests, Parks and Recreation, U.S. Forest Service, National Park Service, Appalachian Trail Conservancy, and private landowners. During the mud season in late spring, some sections of the trail are closed to hikers, to protect the trail from both erosion and to protect nearby flora from being damaged (especially the higher peaks that possess fragile alpine tundra).

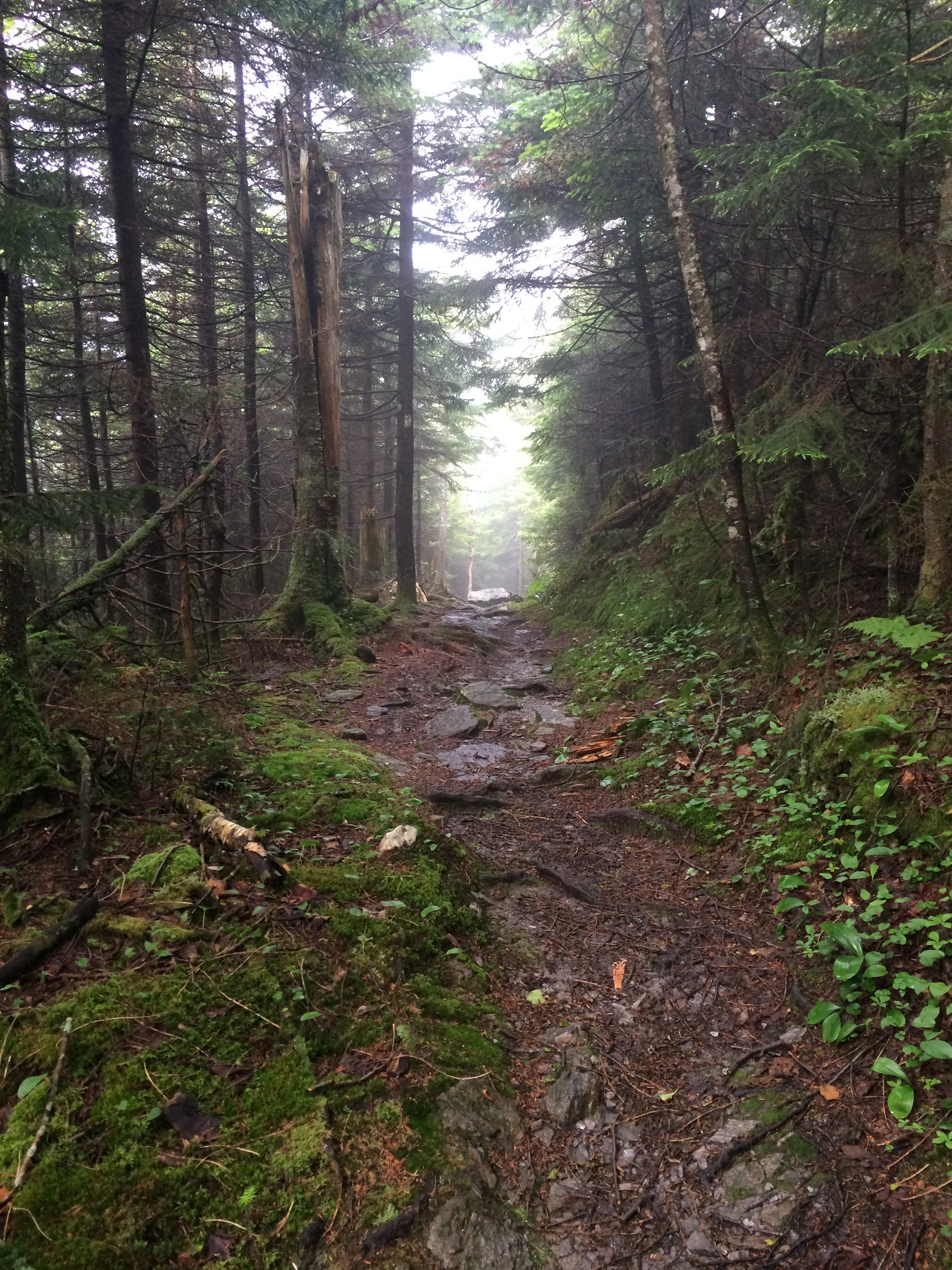
Section of the Long Trail

== Historical disappearances ==
The section of the Long Trail between Woodford (on Vermont State Route 9 just east of Bennington, Vt) and Glastenbury Mountain some 10 miles (16 km) farther north has gained notoriety because six people vanished in that area between 1945 and 1950. Only one body was found and the fates of the other missing persons remain a mystery.

The case that perhaps gained the most media attention at the time was the disappearance of 18-year-old Bennington College sophomore Paula Jean Welden, of Stamford, Connecticut, (elder daughter of industrial designer William Archibald Welden of the Revere Copper and Brass Company). On the afternoon of Sunday, December 1, 1946, she set out on a hike by herself on the Long Trail from Woodford Hollow heading northbound in the direction of Glastenbury Mountain. Despite repeated and extensive searches of the area by local police, the National Guard and many volunteers, nothing was ever found. Foul play is suspected in her disappearance.

Crime novelist Hillary Waugh based his book Last Seen Wearing on the Welden case.

== Gallery ==
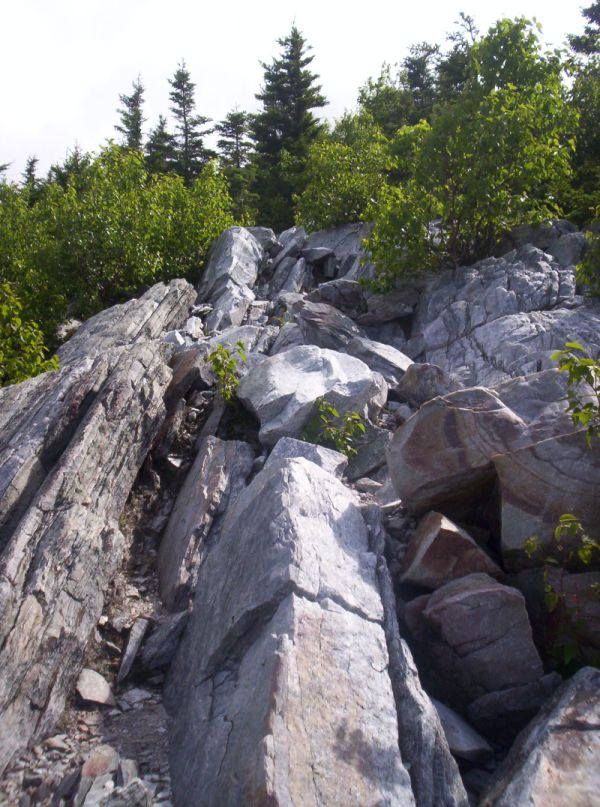
Baker Peak in the White Rocks National Recreation Area

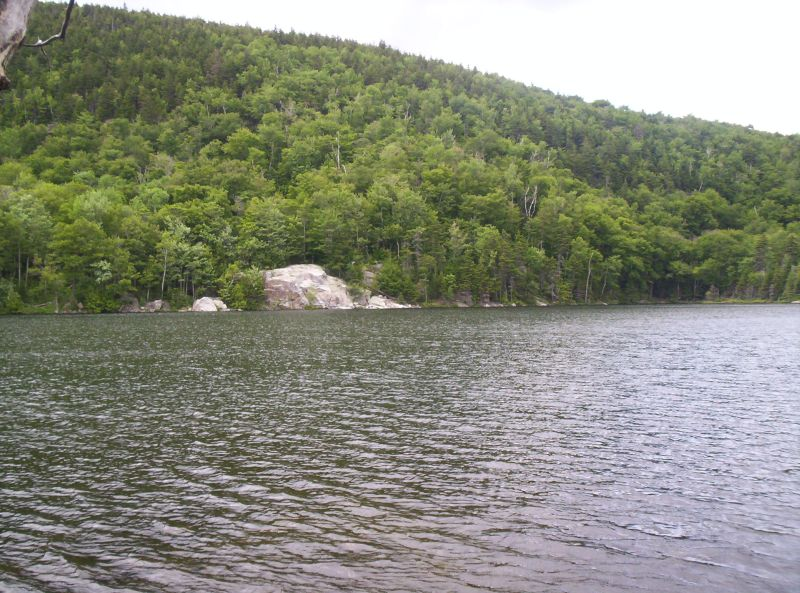
Little Rock Pond from the Long Trail

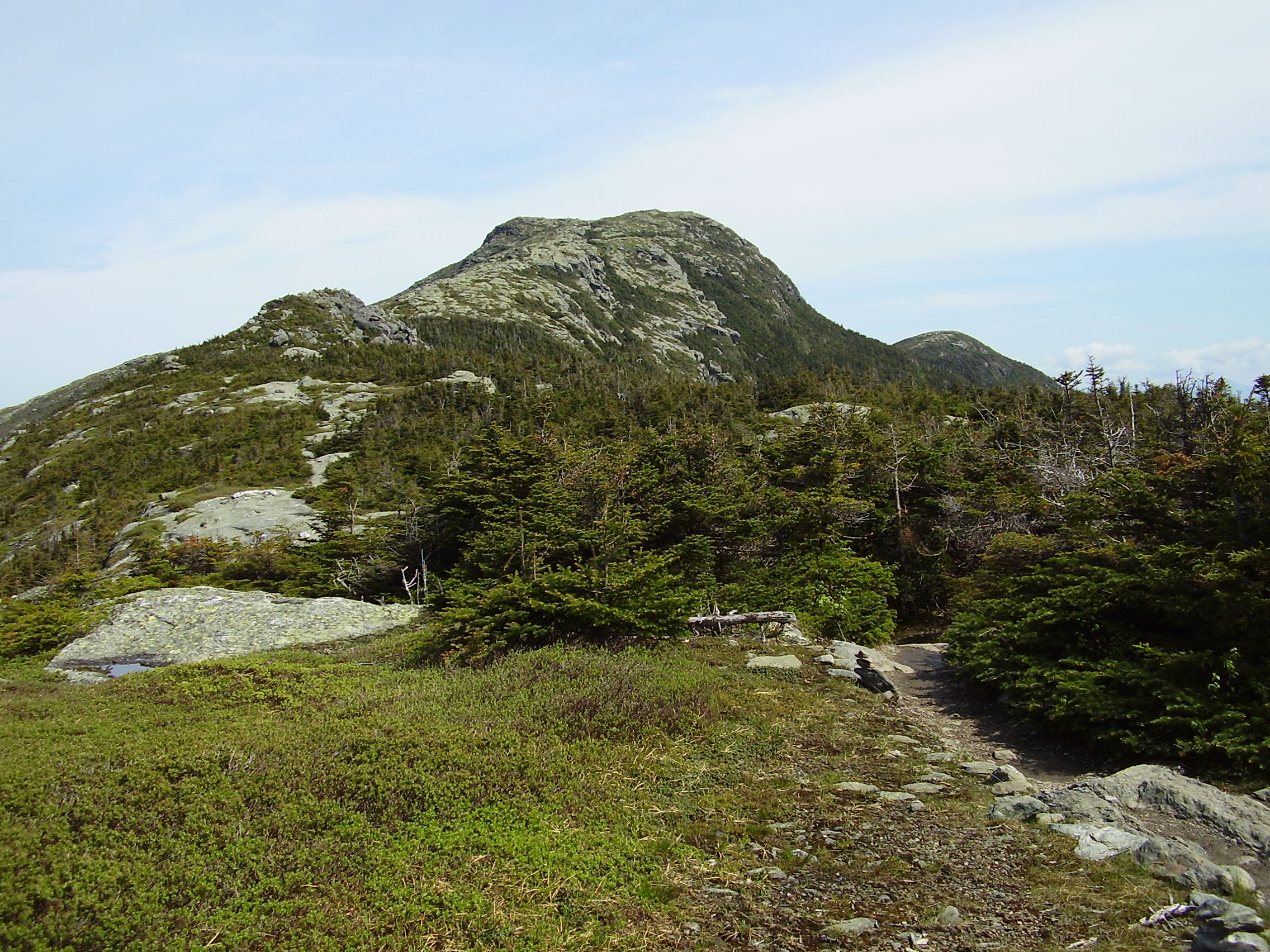
View of Mount Mansfield from the Long Trail

== See also ==
- Long Trail State Forest
- Long Path
