= Green Mountain Club =

U.S. non-profit organization

Green Mountain Club logo, last revised in 2007

The Green Mountain Club is a non-profit membership organization dedicated to preserving and protecting Vermont's Long Trail. The Long Trail is the oldest long-distance hiking trail in America and stretches from the Massachusetts state line to the Canada–United States border, along the main ridge of the Green Mountains.

== History ==
Conceived on March 11, 1910, by James P. Taylor who was at the time the Assistant Headmaster of the Vermont Academy in Windsor, Vermont. Taylor lobbied other Vermont residents who shared his dream of a mission to "make the Vermont mountains play a larger part in the life of the people by protecting and maintaining the Long Trail system and fostering, through education, the stewardship of Vermont's hiking trails and mountains". In 1910, work began on the construction of America's first long-distance hiking path known as the Long Trail. The club completed the Long Trail in 1930.

== Today ==
With 10,000 members, the club remains responsible for the trail, and is recognized by the state legislature as "the founder, sponsor, defender, and protector" of the Long Trail System.

In addition to being the steward of the Long Trail, the Club's advocacy and education efforts also protect Vermont's many other hiking trails. Through its land protection program in northern Vermont, the Club has protected almost 80 miles of the Long Trail System, conserved 25,099 acres, and completed 89 land and easement acquisitions since 1986. Moreover, The GMC publishes guidebooks, newsletters, and other printed media that serve hikers who wish to walk the Long Trail.

The Green Mountain Club maintains the 272 mile Long Trail in cooperation with the Vermont Department of Forests, Parks and Recreation, U.S. Forest Service, National Park Service, Appalachian Trail Conservancy, and private landowners.

The Green Mountain Club also manages the section of the Appalachian Trail that passes through Vermont. The Appalachian Trail follows the Long Trail from the Vermont/Massachusetts state line to Route 4, at which point the Long Trail continues north and the Appalachian Trail heads eastward towards the White Mountains in New Hampshire. The GMC also manages other hiking trails in Vermont's Northeast Kingdom region.

== GMC chapters ==
The Green Mountain Club separates out into chapters, called "sections" — since they maintain sections of the Long Trail and its side trails — are located throughout the state. Below are a complete list of the GMC chapters:

- Bennington
- Brattleboro
- Bread Loaf
- Burlington
- Connecticut
- Killington
- Laraway
- Manchester
- Montpelier
- Northeast Kingdom
- Northern Frontier
- Ottauquechee
- Sterling
- Worcester

== See also ==
- Appalachian Trail
- White Mountain National Forest
