= Green Mountain National Forest =

National Forest in Vermont, US

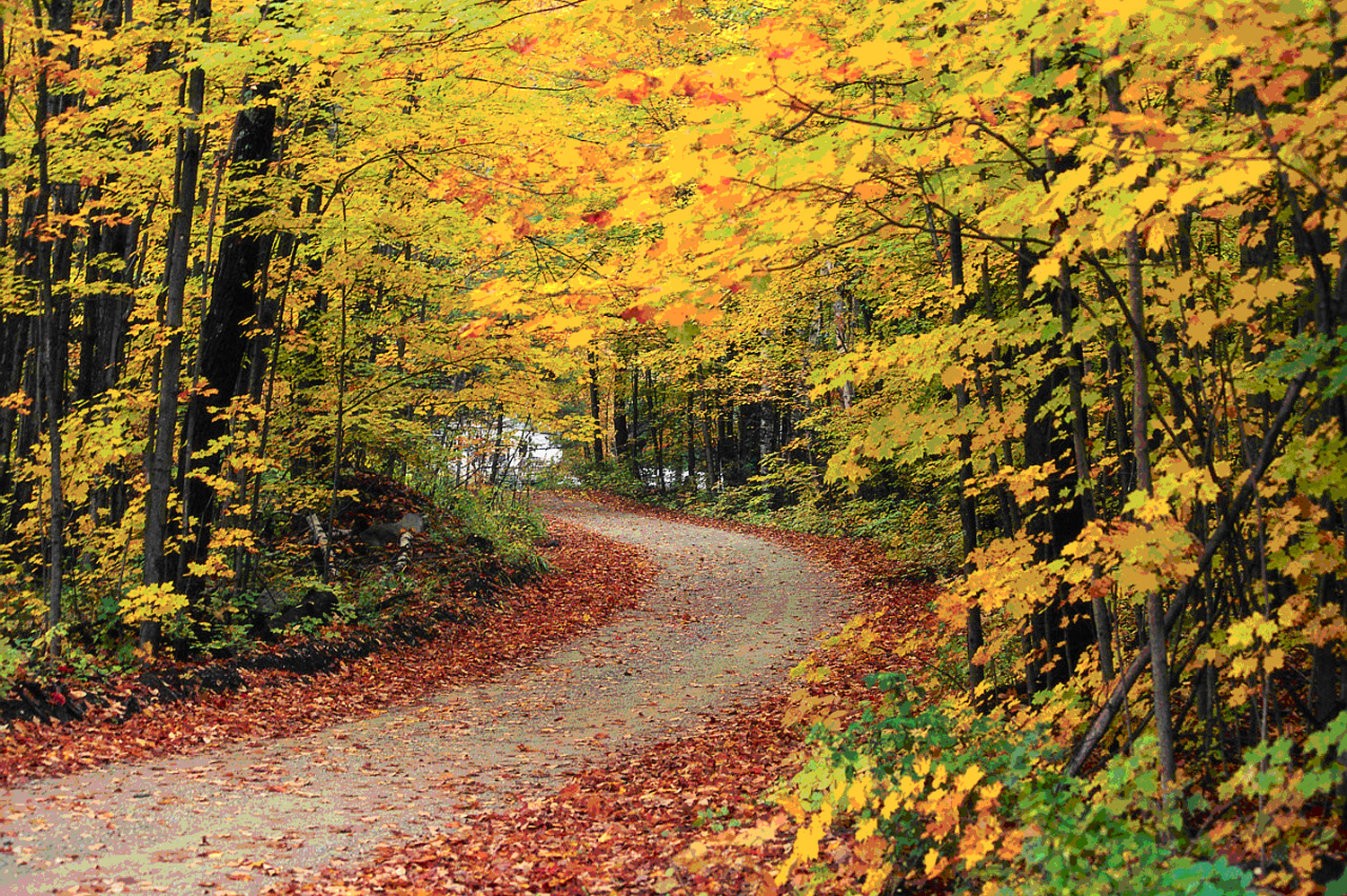
- Green Mountain National Forest in October 2011

- Location within the United States Location within Vermont
- Interactive map of Green Mountain National Forest
- Location: Vermont, United States
- Nearest city: Rutland
- Coordinates: 43°57′N 73°04′W
- Area: 399,151 acres (1,615.31 km^{2}) federal 421,889 acres (1,707.32 km^{2}) other
- Established: April 25, 1932
- Governing body: U.S. Forest Service
- Website: Green Mountain & Finger Lakes National Forests

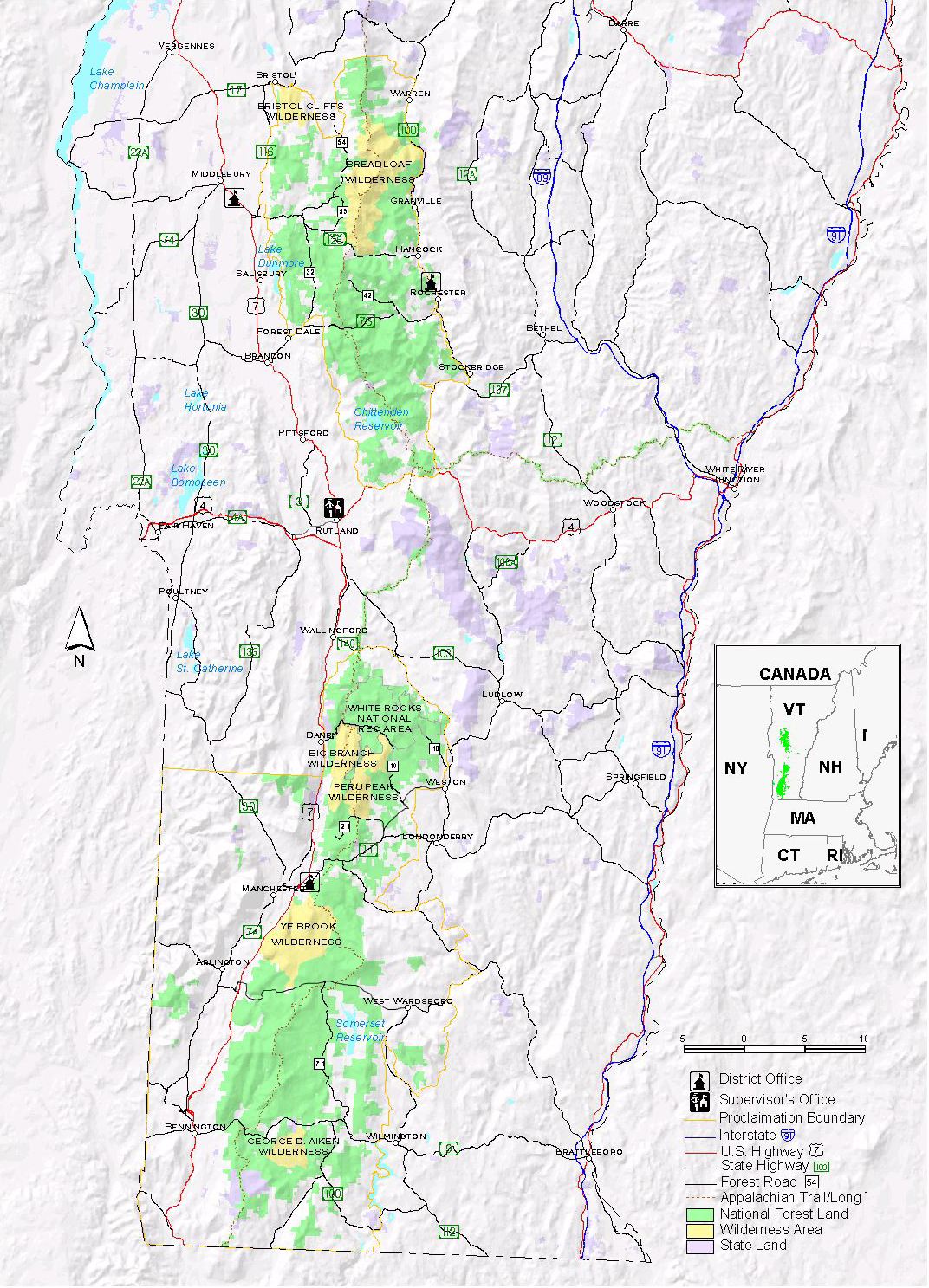
Map of Green Mountain National Forest

Green Mountain National Forest is a national forest located in Vermont, a temperate broadleaf and mixed forest typical of the New England/Acadian forests ecoregion. The forest supports a variety of wildlife, including beaver, moose, coyote, black bear, white-tailed deer, wild turkey, and ruffed grouse. The forest, being situated in Vermont's Green Mountains, has been referred to as the granite backbone of the state.

Established in 1932 due to uncontrolled overlogging, fire and flooding, the forest originally consisted of 102,100 acres (413 km^{2}); however, only 1,842 acres (7.45 km^{2}) were federally owned, while the remaining 100,258 acres (405.73 km^{2}) within the national forest boundary were not federally owned or administered. As of 2011, the forest boundaries included 821,040 acres (3,322.6 km^{2}), of which 399,151 acres (1,615.31 km^{2}) were federally owned and administered. GMNF is one of only two national forest areas in New England, the other area being the White Mountain National Forest in New Hampshire.

In descending order of land area, GMNF is located in parts of Bennington, Addison, Rutland, Windham, Windsor, and Washington counties. The forest headquarters are in Mendon, Vermont, alongside those of Finger Lakes National Forest though that forest is in New York state.

The forest contains three nationally designated trails, including parts of the Appalachian Trail and the Long Trail, as well as the Robert Frost National Recreation Trail. The forest also includes three alpine ski areas, seven Nordic ski areas, and approximately 900 mi (1,400 km) of multiple-use trails for hiking, cross country skiing, snowmobiling, horseback riding, and bicycling.

The forest benefited from the American Reinvestment and Recovery Act of 2009. Forest revenue is generated by recreation fees (such as at Mount Snow, Stratton Mountain and Bromley Mountain ski areas) and timber sales. About 42 acres (17 ha) were set aside for forest regeneration in 2009. Planned expenditures include road construction, recreation and heritage, and wildlife management. Projects in the latter category include: land/water modification in support of ruffed grouse, wild turkeys, bear, trout, salmon, Bicknell's thrush, and the plant Jacob's ladder. The emerald ash borer is a threat to Vermont's trees.

== Wilderness areas ==
There are eight officially designated wilderness areas in the Green Mountain National Forest (from north to south):

	Approximate area		Created by
	acres	ha	Created by
Bristol Cliffs Wilderness	3,750	1,520	Eastern Wilderness Areas Act of 1975
Breadloaf Wilderness	24,986	10,111	Vermont Wilderness Act of 1984
Joseph Battell Wilderness	12,336	4,992	New England Wilderness Act of 2006
Big Branch Wilderness	6,725	2,722	Vermont Wilderness Act of 1984
Peru Peak Wilderness	7,825	3,167	Vermont Wilderness Act of 1984
Lye Brook Wilderness	18,122	7,334	Eastern Wilderness Areas Act of 1975
Glastenbury Wilderness	22,400	9,100	New England Wilderness Act of 2006
George D. Aiken Wilderness	4,800	1,900	Vermont Wilderness Act of 1984

Each of these wilderness areas is wholly located in Vermont and is managed by the United States Forest Service as part of the National Wilderness Preservation System. As such, these areas are off-limits to all motorized and mechanical vehicles, including bicycles.

== Recreation areas ==
There are two officially designated recreation areas in the Green Mountain National Forest (from north to south):

	Approximate area		Created by
	acres	ha	Created by
Moosalamoo National Recreation Area	15,857	6,417	New England Wilderness Act of 2006
White Rocks National Recreation Area	36,400	14,700	Vermont Wilderness Act of 1984

The latter includes both the Big Branch Wilderness and Peru Peak Wilderness within its boundaries.

== See also ==
- List of national forests of the United States
