= Presidential Range (Green Mountains) =

Mountain range in Vermont, U.S.

Highest point
- Peak: Mount Abraham
- Elevation: 4,006 ft (1,221 m)
- Prominence: 286 ft (87 m)

Naming
- Etymology: U.S. presidents

Geography
- Country: United States
- State: Vermont
- Region: New England
- County: Addison
- Parent range: Green Mountains

The Presidential Range is a mountain range in the Green Mountains of the U.S. state of Vermont. All of the summits of the peaks in the range are located in Addison County but the eastern slopes in the northern part of the range extend into Washington County. The major peaks in the range are named for several U.S. presidents from the period of the American Civil War through World War I.

All of the peaks in the Presidential Range are above 3,000 feet (914 m) and all but one are above 3,500 feet (1,067 m). The highest peak in the range is Mount Abraham at 4,006 feet (1,221 m), while the second highest peak is Mount Wilson at 3,745 feet (1,141 m). Both peaks are among the one hundred highest peaks in New England.

== Description ==
From north to south (which corresponds to the chronological order of the corresponding presidencies), the Presidential Range includes:

- Mount Abraham, 4,006 feet (1,221 m), named after Abraham Lincoln, U.S. President, 1861–1865
- Mount Grant, 3,623 feet (1,104 m), named after Ulysses S. Grant, U.S. President, 1869–1877
- Mount Cleveland, 3,482 feet (1,061 m), named after Grover Cleveland, U.S. President, 1885–1889 and 1893–1897
- Mount Roosevelt, 3,528 feet (1,075 m), named after Theodore Roosevelt, U.S. President, 1901–1909
- Mount Wilson, 3,745 feet (1,141 m), named after Woodrow Wilson, U.S. President, 1913–1921

The three northernmost summits are in the town of Lincoln while the other two are in Ripton (all in Addison County). Except for Mount Abraham, the major peaks of the range are in the Breadloaf Wilderness in the Green Mountain National Forest. Mount Abraham is separated from the other peaks by Lincoln Gap, the highest vehicle-accessible mountain pass in Vermont.

== Drainage basin ==
Most of Presidential Range lies within the watershed of Lake Champlain, which drains into the Richelieu River in Québec, the Saint Lawrence River, and then eventually into the Gulf of Saint Lawrence. Portions of Mount Roosevelt and Mount Wilson lie within the watershed of the Connecticut River, which drains into Long Island Sound in Connecticut.

== Trails ==
The Long Trail, a 273-mile (439 km) hiking trail running the length of Vermont, traverses the major peaks of the Presidential Range. The trail enters the southern edge of the Breadloaf Wilderness at Middlebury Gap on Vermont Route 125 and winds northward 28.9 miles (46.5 km) along the ridge of the Green Mountains to Appalachian Gap on Vermont Route 17:

Distance northbound		Feature	Approximate altitude		Distance southbound	
miles	km	Feature	feet	m	miles	km
28.9	46.5	Appalachian Gap	2,377	725	0.0	0.0
25.8	41.5	Stark Mountain	3,662	1,116	3.1	5.0
23.6	38.0	Mount Ellen	4,083	1,244	5.3	8.5
21.2	34.1	Nancy Hanks Peak	3,812	1,162	7.7	12.4
20.7	33.3	Lincoln Peak	3,975	1,212	8.2	13.2
19.9	32.0	Mount Abraham	4,006	1,221	9.0	14.5
19.1	30.7	Battell Shelter	3,240	990	9.8	15.8
19.0	30.6	Junction: Battell Trail	3,220	980	9.9	15.9
17.3	27.8	Lincoln Gap	2,424	739	11.6	18.7
13.4	21.6	Mount Grant	3,623	1,104	15.5	24.9
12.6	20.3	Cooley Glen Shelter; Junction: Cooley Glen Trail	3,130	950	16.3	26.2
12.1	19.5	Mount Cleveland	3,482	1,061	16.8	27.0
9.0	14.5	Mount Roosevelt	3,528	1,075	19.9	32.0
8.6	13.8	Junction: Clark Brook Trail	3,390	1,030	20.3	32.7
7.8	12.6	Mount Wilson	3,745	1,141	21.1	34.0
6.9	11.1	Emily Proctor Shelter; Junction: Emily Proctor Trail	3,460	1,050	22.0	35.4
6.3	10.1	Bread Loaf Mountain	3,835	1,169	22.6	36.4
0.0	0.0	Middlebury Gap	2,144	653	28.9	46.5

Apart from the Presidential Range, there are five peaks above 3,500 feet (1,067 m) on this section of the Long Trail. North of Mount Abraham, there are four such peaks: Lincoln Peak, Nancy Hanks Peak, Mount Ellen, and Stark Mountain. South of Mount Wilson, the only such peak is Bread Loaf Mountain.

Thru hikers traverse 12.1 miles (19.5 km) of trail between Mount Wilson and Mount Abraham. Along the way, four side trails provide access to the Long Trail (Emily Proctor Trail, Clark Brook Trail, Cooley Glen Trail, and Battell Trail) with limited off-road parking at each trailhead. There are three shelters on this section of the Long Trail: Emily Proctor Shelter, Cooley Glen Shelter, and Battell Shelter. Each shelter is at the intersection of the Long Trail and the corresponding side trail.

A popular day hike begins and ends where the Long Trail crosses Lincoln Gap Road in the town of Lincoln. From Lincoln Gap, the summit of Mount Abraham is 2.6 miles (4.2 km) north on the Long Trail. Alternatively, the Battell Trail, whose trailhead is also in Lincoln, terminates at the Battell Shelter after 2.0 miles (3.2 km). From the shelter, the summit is 0.8 miles (1.3 km) north on the Long Trail.

The Emily Proctor Trail and the Cooley Glen Trail share the same trailhead. A popular loop hike begins and ends at this trailhead. The 12.4-mile (20.0 km) loop hike takes in three peaks of the Presidential Range: Mount Wilson, Mount Roosevelt, and Mount Cleveland. A fourth president, Mount Grant, is just off the main loop, 0.8 miles (1.3 km) north of the Cooley Glen Shelter on the Long Trail.
