= Mount Roosevelt (Vermont) =

Mountain in Vermont, U.S.

- Location within Vermont

Highest point
- Elevation: 3,528 ft (1,075 m)
- Prominence: 260 ft (79 m)
- Isolation: 0.83 mi (1.34 km)
- Listing: Mountains of Vermont
- Coordinates: 44°01′12″N 072°55′03″W

Geography
- Country: United States
- State: Vermont
- County: Addison
- Town: Ripton
- Parent range: Green Mountains
- Topo map: USGS Lincoln Mountain Quad

Mount Roosevelt is a mountain in the Green Mountains in the U.S. state of Vermont. Located in the Breadloaf Wilderness of the Green Mountain National Forest, its summit is in the town of Ripton in Addison County. The mountain is named after Theodore Roosevelt, former president of the United States. Mount Roosevelt is one of five peaks in Vermont's Presidential Range.

== Drainage basin ==
Mount Roosevelt stands within the watersheds of Lake Champlain and the Connecticut River. The southeast side of Mount Roosevelt drains into the Clark Brook, thence into the White River, the Connecticut River, and ultimately into Long Island Sound in Connecticut. The north and west sides of Mount Roosevelt drain into the headwaters of the New Haven River, thence into Otter Creek, Lake Champlain, Canada's Richelieu River, the Saint Lawrence River, and ultimately into the Gulf of Saint Lawrence.

== Hiking ==
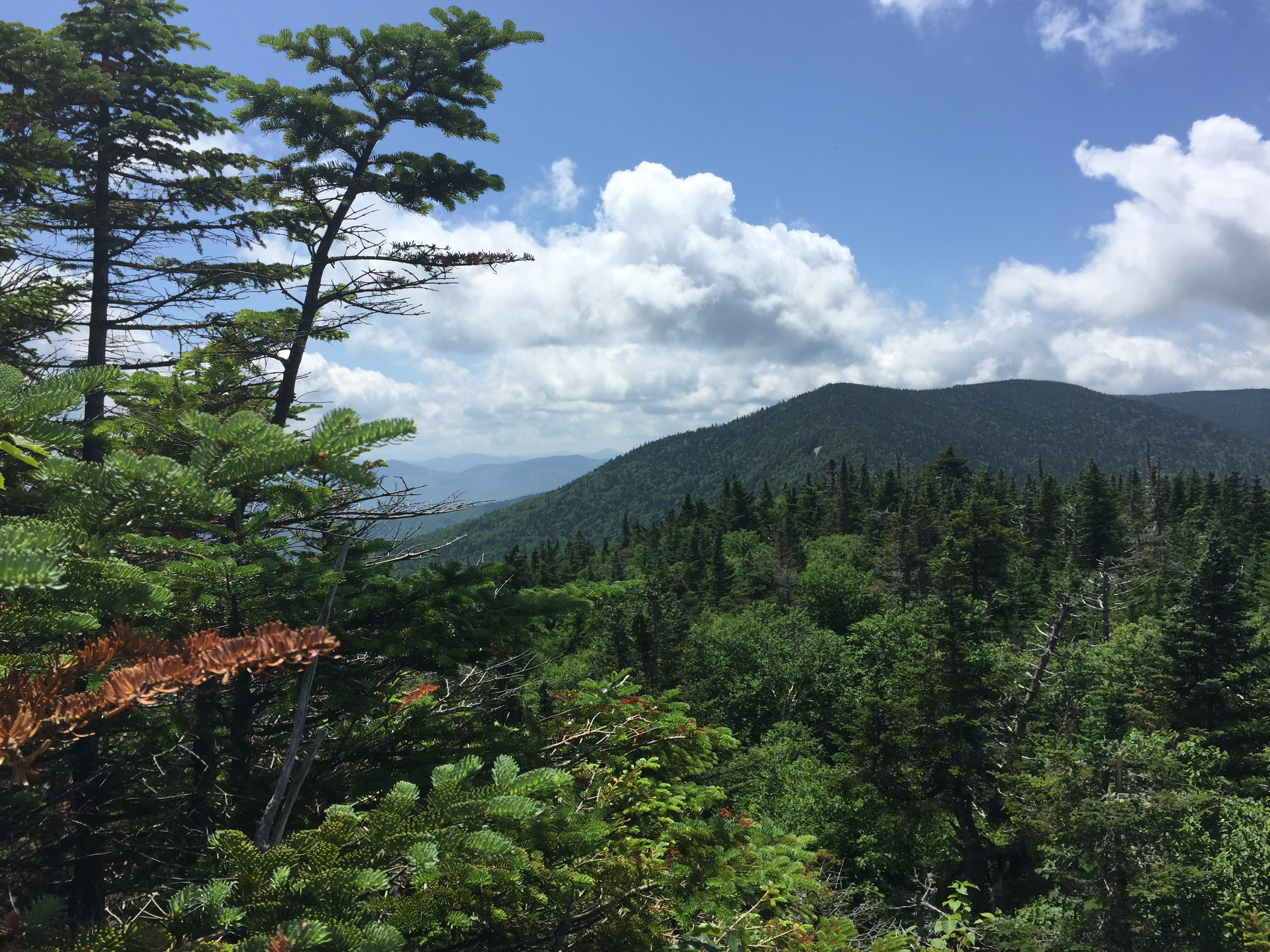
At Killington View on the Long Trail in the Breadloaf Wilderness in the Green Mountain National Forest

The Long Trail traverses the summit of Mount Roosevelt at 3,528 feet (1,075 m). Multiple side trails provide access to this section of the Long Trail. The Clark Brook Trail, whose trailhead is in the town of Granville, intersects the Long Trail after 3.0 miles (4.8 km). From the junction, Mount Roosevelt is approximately 0.4 miles (0.6 km) north on Long Trail. The Emily Proctor Trail, whose trailhead is in the town of Lincoln, terminates at the Emily Proctor Shelter, which is 2.1 miles (3.4 km) south of Mount Roosevelt on the Long Trail.

The Cooley Glen Trail, whose trailhead coincides with the Emily Proctor Trailhead, terminates at the Cooley Glen Shelter, which is approximately 3.6 miles (5.8 km) north of Mount Roosevelt on the Long Trail. A popular loop hike begins at the Cooley Glen Trailhead (or the Emily Proctor Trailhead in a counterclockwise direction). The 12.4-mile (20.0 km) loop hike takes in three peaks of the Presidential Range: Mount Cleveland, Mount Roosevelt, and Mount Wilson. A fourth president, Mount Grant, is just off the main loop, 0.8 miles (1.3 km) north of the Cooley Glen Shelter.

Killington View is approximately 0.4 miles (0.64 km) east of Mount Roosevelt on the Long Trail. From there, one can see Killington Peak more than 30 miles (48 km) to the south.
