= Lincoln (CDP), Vermont =

Census-designated place in Vermont, United States

Lincoln, Vermont
- Census-designated place
- Location within Vermont Location within the United States
- Coordinates: 44°06′11″N 72°59′54″W
- Country: United States
- State: Vermont
- County: Addison
- Town: Lincoln

Area
  - Total: 2.39 sq mi (6.18 km^{2})
  - Land: 2.36 sq mi (6.11 km^{2})
  - Water: 0.027 sq mi (0.07 km^{2})
- Elevation: 984 ft (300 m)
- Time zone: UTC-5 (Eastern (EST))
  - Summer (DST): UTC-4 (EDT)
- ZIP Code: 05443
- Area code: 802
- FIPS code: 50-40000
- GNIS feature ID: 2805701

Lincoln is the central settlement and a census-designated place (CDP) in the town of Lincoln, Addison County, Vermont, United States. It was first listed as a CDP prior to the 2020 census.

== Geography ==
The community is in the eastern part of Addison County, at the center of the town of Lincoln, in the valley of the New Haven River, a west-flowing tributary of Otter Creek and part of the Lake Champlain watershed. Via West River Road, it is 5 miles (8 km) northwest to Bristol, while East River Road leads southeast from Lincoln village 3 miles (5 km) to South Lincoln. Lincoln Gap Road leaves from the southeast corner of the CDP and leads east over the crest of the Green Mountains at Lincoln Gap 8 miles (13 km) to the center of Warren.
