= Mount Cleveland (Vermont) =

Mountain in Vermont, U.S.

- Location within Vermont

Highest point
- Elevation: 3,482 ft (1,061 m)
- Prominence: 362 ft (110 m)
- Isolation: 0.92 mi (1.48 km)
- Listing: Mountains of Vermont
- Coordinates: 44°02′46″N 072°54′29″W

Geography
- Country: United States
- State: Vermont
- County: Addison
- Town: Lincoln
- Parent range: Green Mountains
- Topo map: USGS Lincoln Mountain Quad

Mount Cleveland is a mountain in the Green Mountains in the U.S. state of Vermont. Located in the Breadloaf Wilderness of the Green Mountain National Forest, its summit is in the town of Lincoln in Addison County. The mountain is named after Grover Cleveland, former president of the United States. Mount Cleveland is one of five peaks in Vermont's Presidential Range.

== Drainage basin ==
Mount Cleveland stands within the watershed of Lake Champlain, which drains into the Richelieu River in Québec, the Saint Lawrence River, and then eventually into the Gulf of Saint Lawrence. The north side of Mount Cleveland drains into Stetson Brook, thence into the Mad River, the Winooski River, and into Lake Champlain. The south and east sides of Mount Cleveland drain into Austin Brook and then into the Mad River. The west side of Mount Cleveland drains into the New Haven River, thence into Otter Creek, and into Lake Champlain.

== Hiking ==
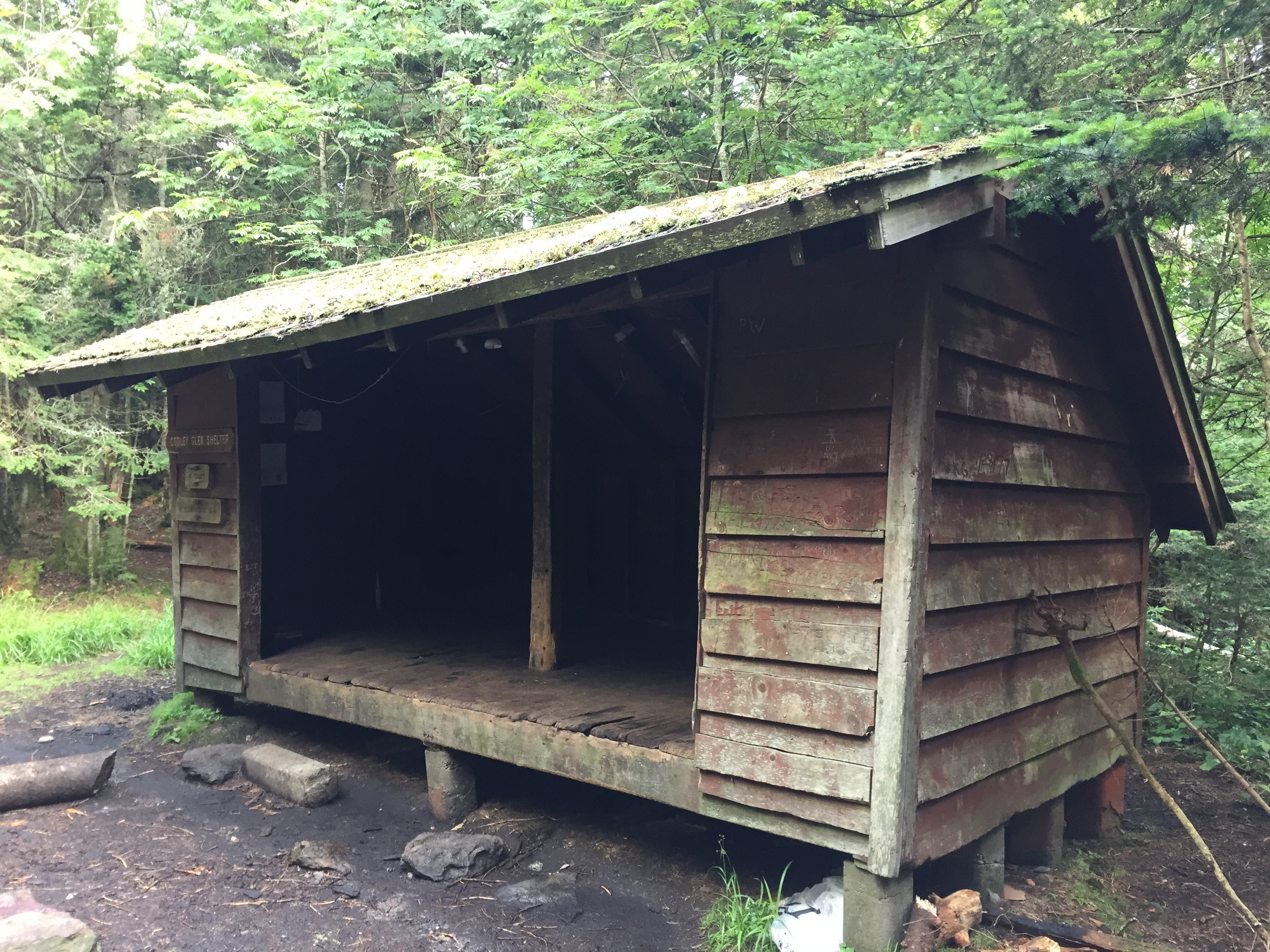
The Cooley Glen Shelter on the Long Trail in the Breadloaf Wilderness in the Green Mountain National Forest

The Long Trail traverses the summit of Mount Cleveland at 3,482 feet (1,061 m). The Cooley Glen Trail, whose trailhead is in the town of Lincoln, terminates at the Cooley Glen Shelter after 3.2 miles (5.1 km). From the shelter, Mount Cleveland is 0.5 miles (0.80 km) south on the Long Trail.

The Emily Proctor Trail, whose trailhead coincides with the Cooley Glen Trailhead, terminates at the Emily Proctor Shelter, which is approximately 5.2 miles (8.4 km) south of Mount Cleveland on the Long Trail. A popular loop hike begins and ends at the Cooley Glen Trailhead (or the Emily Proctor Trailhead in a counterclockwise direction). The 12.4-mile (20.0 km) loop hike takes in three peaks of the Presidential Range: Mount Cleveland, Mount Roosevelt, and Mount Wilson. A fourth president, Mount Grant, is just off the main loop, 0.8 miles (1.3 km) north of the Cooley Glen Shelter on the Long Trail.
