= Mount Wilson (Vermont) =

Mountain in Vermont, U.S.

- Location within Vermont

Highest point
- Elevation: 3,745 ft (1,141 m)
- Prominence: 200 ft (61 m)
- Listing: #92 New England 100 Highest
- Coordinates: 44°00′17″N 072°55′32″W

Geography
- Country: United States
- State: Vermont
- County: Addison
- Town: Ripton
- Parent range: Green Mountains
- Topo map: USGS Lincoln Mountain Quad

Climbing
- Easiest route: maintained hiking trail

Mount Wilson is a mountain in the Green Mountains in the U.S. state of Vermont. Located in the Breadloaf Wilderness of the Green Mountain National Forest, its summit is in the town of Ripton in Addison County. The mountain is named after Woodrow Wilson, former president of the United States. Flanked by Bread Loaf Mountain to the southwest, Mount Wilson is one of five peaks in Vermont's Presidential Range. At 3,745 feet (1,141 m), it is the 12th highest peak in Vermont and one of the hundred highest peaks in New England.

== Drainage basin ==
Mount Wilson stands within the watersheds of Lake Champlain and the Connecticut River. The southeast side of Mount Wilson drains into the headwaters of the White River, thence into the Connecticut River, which drains into Long Island Sound in Connecticut. The northeast side of Mount Wilson drains into the Clark Brook and thence into the White River. The northwest side of Mount Wilson drains into the headwaters of the New Haven River, thence into Otter Creek, Lake Champlain, Canada's Richelieu River, the Saint Lawrence River, and ultimately into the Gulf of Saint Lawrence.

== Hiking ==
The Long Trail traverses the summit of Mount Wilson. Multiple side trails provide access to this section of the Long Trail. The Clark Brook Trail, whose trailhead is in the town of Granville, intersects the Long Trail after 3.0 miles (4.8 km). From the junction, Mount Wilson is 0.8 miles (1.3 km) south on Long Trail. The Emily Proctor Trail, whose trailhead is in the town of Lincoln, terminates at the Emily Proctor Shelter after 3.5 miles (5.6 km). From the shelter, Mount Wilson is 0.9 miles (1.4 km) north on Long Trail. In the opposite direction, Bread Loaf Mountain is 0.7 miles (1.1 km) from the shelter.

The Cooley Glen Trail, whose trailhead coincides with the Emily Proctor Trailhead, terminates at the Cooley Glen Shelter, which is approximately 4.8 miles (7.7 km) north of Mount Wilson on the Long Trail. A popular loop hike begins and ends at the Emily Proctor Trailhead (or the Cooley Glen Trailhead in a clockwise direction). The 12.4-mile (20.0 km) loop hike takes in three peaks of the Presidential Range: Mount Wilson, Mount Roosevelt, and Mount Cleveland. A fourth president, Mount Grant, is just off the main loop, 0.8 miles (1.3 km) north of the Cooley Glen Shelter on the Long Trail.

== See also ==
- List of mountains in Vermont
- List of New England Hundred Highest
