= Laurie D. Cox =

American landscape architect and lacrosse coach

Laurie Davidson Cox
- Born: August 18, 1883; Londonderry, Nova Scotia, Canada
- Died: October 1, 1968 (aged 85); Henniker, New Hampshire
- Education: Acadia University, 1903; Harvard University, 1908
- Occupation: Professor
- Known for: Landscape architect, & lacrosse contributor

Laurie Davidson Cox (August 18, 1883 – October 1, 1968) was a leading American landscape architect and Hall of Fame coach and contributor to the sport of lacrosse. He was professor of Landscape Engineering at the New York State College of Forestry at Syracuse University, where he was responsible for establishing Syracuse University's lacrosse program. Cox later became the president of New England College.

== Early life ==
Born in Londonderry, Nova Scotia, Canada, Cox attended high school at Bellows Falls High School in Vermont. Following high school he returned to Canada, attending Acadia University where he would receive a degree in 1903. Cox then attended Harvard University where he graduated magna cum laude in 1908 with a Landscape Architecture degree. While at Harvard, Cox played lacrosse, basketball and ice hockey. On September 7, 1910, Cox married Gretchen Smith.

== Career ==
=== Landscape architecture ===
Cox was one of the leading landscape architects in the United States. Following his studies at Harvard, Cox worked for four years with the Los Angeles Parks Department. While working there, he designed the exterior landscapes of both the Lincoln Park and Griffith Park, and called for the creation of a city parkway that would "add to the health and happiness of its citizens." His plan was only partially implemented.

With funding from John D. Rockefeller, in 1915 Cox performed the first census of trees in New York City. In his report, A Street Tree System for New York City, Borough of Manhattan, Cox found that most street trees in Manhattan to be in poor condition. One of his recommendations was to plant 200 trees per square mile on the island.

Cox advocated for a new kind of park in the US National Park system that balanced the desire for recreation and preservation. In 1934, Cox surveyed Vermont's Green Mountains with the intent of creating a national park in the state. Cox's vision of a Green Mountain Parkway (later Green Mountain National Forest) included moving parts of Vermont's Long Trail to allow the trail and the park intersect. Cox's vision also included a concept of a "skyline drive". Revolutionary at the time, Cox recognized the changing American culture and the automobile and included many "windshield" views throughout the 240 miles (390 km) park length.

In 1929, the Administration Building at Green Lakes State Park, near Fayetteville, New York, was built according to plans by Cox, who was active in the design of several New York state parks.

=== Academic ===
In 1915, Cox was appointed an associate professor of Landscape Engineering at the New York State College of Forestry at Syracuse University. He served a Head of the Department from 1915 to 1947, during his entire tenure at Syracuse. After leaving Syracuse University, Cox served as president of New England College in Henniker, New Hampshire from 1947–1950 and then again from 1952–1955.

He was also a Fellow of the American Institute of Parks and an executive and a life member of the board of directors of the National Conference on State Parks.

== Lacrosse ==
Lacrosse has "the same elements which have elevated (American) football to its present intercollegiate standing. It is a sport in which fight, brawn, and skill combine to make victory reality.

— Laurie D. Cox: Reflecting on potential of lacrosse in U.S. collegiate sports.

Outside of academics and landscape architecture, Cox is recognized as one of the greatest contributors to the game of lacrosse in the United States. His impact on the sport was dramatic, both locally in upstate New York, and nationally. Founding one of the most recognized collegiate programs in the country, Cox was dedicated to the integrity and growth of the game.

Known for his excellent stick handling as a player, Cox was able to play any position on the field. Once Cox was established as a professor at Syracuse University, he recruited forestry students to start a lacrosse team at the school in the spring of 1916. Later that fall, the University recognized lacrosse as a "minor sport." Cox served as head coach of the Syracuse lacrosse team until 1932.

Cox thought of field lacrosse as a gentleman's game that could rise to prominence among collegiate sports. His advocacy of the game lead some to refer to him as the "father of American lacrosse." The sport grew quickly in intercollegiate ranks shifting the game from a primarily Canadian game to one that garnered elite amateur status among affluent Americans. As a matter of principle and respect for the amateur tradition of the game, Cox accepted no salary for his coaching responsibilities. Cox viewed the introduction and spread of box lacrosse with negativity. He abhorred the commercialism of the new version, and thought it was a "peculiar" hybrid sport. His insistence, and the respect he garnered from fellow coaches and contributors, kept the field game the prevalent version played in America.

In 1922, Cox organized an "All-American" team to travel to Europe to play against British teams. This trip was deemed successful, and a return trip in 1923 was scheduled. Cox envisioned an informal international championship. He would go on to coach the American teams in International competitions in 1930, 1935, and 1937. Cox's "All-American" team consisted mostly of Syracuse players, earning Cox some criticism.

Cox, along with William C. Schmeisser and Charles Lattig, helped develop the uniform code of operation for college lacrosse and established early lacrosse athletic conferences. From 1922 to 1933, when the first lacrosse All-American committee was established (which Cox would serve as Chairman), he would select the honorees and even designed and furnished the certificates to the players. Later, when he became president of the New England College, he would start a lacrosse program there and served as the head coach.

Cox was elected to the U.S. Lacrosse Hall of Fame in its inaugural class in 1957. In 1966, the New England College elected Cox into the school's Athletic Hall of Fame.

== See also ==
- List of National Lacrosse Hall of Fame members
