= List of mountains of Vermont =

This is a list of mountains in the U.S. state of Vermont.

== List ==
Mountain	Image	Height (ft.)	Height (m)	Town	County
Mount Mansfield		4,393	1,339	Underhill	Chittenden
Killington Peak		4,235	1,291	Killington	Rutland
Mount Ellen		4,083	1,244	Warren	Washington
Camel's Hump		4,083	1,244	Duxbury	Washington
Mount Abraham		4,006	1,221	Lincoln	Addison
Lincoln Peak		3,975	1,212	Warren	Washington
Pico Peak		3,957	1,206	Killington	Rutland
Bear Head		3,940	1,201	Stowe	Lamoille
Stratton Mountain		3,940	1,201	Stratton	Windham
Little Killington		3,939	1,201	Mendon	Rutland
North Stratton		3,875	1,181	Stratton	Windham
Jay Peak		3,858	1,176	Westfield	Orleans
Equinox Mountain		3,840	1,170	Manchester	Bennington
Mendon Peak		3,840	1,170	Mendon	Rutland
Bread Loaf Mountain		3,835	1,169	Ripton	Addison
Nancy Hanks Peak		3,812	1,162	Warren	Washington
Skye Peak		3,800	1,158	Killington	Rutland
Big Jay		3,786	1,154	Montgomery	Franklin
Mount Wilson		3,780	1,152	Ripton	Addison
Dorset Mountain		3,760	1,146	Danby	Rutland
Glastenbury Mountain		3,748	1,142	Glastenbury	Bennington
Shrewsbury Peak		3,720	1,134	Shrewsbury	Rutland
Whiteface Mountain		3,715	1,132	Jeffersonville	Lamoille
Ethan Allen Mountain		3,688	1,124	Duxbury	Washington
Bolton Mountain		3,680	1,122	Bolton	Chittenden
Stark Mountain		3,662	1,116	Fayston	Washington
Mount Putnam		3,642	1,110	Worcester	Washington
Madonna Peak		3,640	1,109	Jeffersonville	Lamoille
Mount Grant		3,623	1,104	Lincoln	Addison
Rams Head		3,600	1,097	Killington	Rutland
Snowden Peak		3,592	1,095	Killington	Rutland
Mount Snow		3,586	1,093	West Dover	
Hunger Mountain		3,539	1,079	Worcester	
Mount Roosevelt		3,528	1,075	Ripton	
Farr Peak		3,522	1,074	Chittenden	
Bloodroot Mountain		3,485	1,062	Chittenden	
Mount Cleveland		3,482	1,061	Lincoln	
Mount Ira Allen		3,460	1,055	Duxbury	
Haystack Mountain		3,445	1,050	Wilmington	
East Mountain		3,439	1,048	East Haven	
North Jay Peak		3,438	1,048	Jay	
Peru Peak		3,429	1,045	Peru	
Battell Mountain		3,428	1,045	Ripton	
Ricker Mountain		3,410	1,039	Waterbury	
Styles Peak		3,394	1,034	Peru	
Spruce Peak		3,390	1,033	Stowe	
Morse Mountain		3,380	1,030	Jeffersonville	
Signal Mountain		3,370	1,027	Groton	
Mount Carmel		3,365	1,026	Chittenden	
Dewey Mountain		3,360	1,024	Underhill	
Belvidere Mountain		3,360	1,024	Lowell	
Ludlow Mountain		3,344	1,019	Ludlow	
Okemo Mountain		3,344	1,019	Ludlow	
Cape Lookoff Mountain		3,340	1,018	Goshen	
Gore Mountain		3,332	1,016	Norton	
Cold Hollow Mountain		3,330	1,015	Belvidere	
Boyce Mountain		3,323	1,013	Ripton	
Bald Mountain		3,315	1,010	Westmore	
Bromley Mountain		3,284	1,001	Peru	
Worcester Mountain		3,274	998	Worcester	
Burke Mountain		3,267	996	Burke	
Bear Mountain		3,295	1,004	Killington	
Burnt Rock Mountain		3,168	966	Moretown	
Vista Peak		3,150	960	Waterbury	
Monadnock Mountain		3,148	960	Lemington	
Seneca Mountain		3,146	959	Burke	
Mount Ascutney		3,144	958	Windsor / Weathersfield	
Mount Mayo		3,143	958	Underhill	
Mount Aeolus		3,230	985	Dorset	
Woodward Mountain		3,110	948	Waterbury	
Grass Mountain		3,109	948	Arlington	
Burke Mountain (West Peak)		3,097	944	Burke	
East Haven Mountain		3,070	936	East Haven	
Little Jay		3,045	928	Montgomery	
Mount Tabor		3,043	928	Peru	
Spruce Mountain		3,037	926	Plainfield	
Gilpin Peak		3,015	919	Westfield	
Sterling Peak		3,010	917	Jeffersonville	
Tillotson Peak		2,992	912	Tillotson	
Umpire Mountain		2,967	904	Victory	
Molly Stark Mountain		2,967	904	Fayston	
Mount Clark		2,960	902	Underhill	
Buchanan Mountain		2,940	896	Westfield	
Bone Mountain		2,910	887	Waterbury	
Domeys Dome		2,894	882	Westfield	
Baby Stark Mountain		2,863	873	Fayston	
Buckball Peak		2,858	871	Danby	
Bald Mountain		2,857	871	Woodford	
Glebe Mountain		2,850	869	Londonderry	
South Buckball Peak		2,841	866	Danby	
Baker Peak		2,828	862	Danby	
Consultation Peak		2,810	856	Bennington	
Laraway Mountain		2,796	852	Johnson	
Deer Leap Mountain		1,825	556	Bristol	
Deer Leap Mountain		2,787	849	Killington	
Mount Pisgah		2,752	839	Westmore	
Kirby Mountain		2,750	838	Kirby	
The Dome		2,748	838	Pownal	
Prospect Mountain		2,740	835	Woodford	
Jackson Gore Peak		2,725	831	Ludlow	
Brousseau Mountain		2,723	830	Norton	
Kirby Mountain		2,720	829	Burke	
Bull Mountain		2,710	826	Burke	
White Rocks Mountain		2,680	817	Wallingford	
Mount Hor		2,654	809	Sutton	
Mount Moosalamoo		2,650	808	Brandon	
Stannard Mountain		2,618	798	Stannard	
Elmore Mountain		2,608	795	Elmore	
Mount Norris		2,493	760	Eden Mills	
Woodbury Mountain		2,480	756	Woodbury	
Sunrise Mountain		2,456	749	Killington	
Mount Olga		2,418	737	Wilmington	
Hogback Mountain		2,410	735	Marlboro	
Mount Hunger		2,403	732	Barnard	
Wheeler Mountain		2,365	721	Sutton	
Hooker Mountain		2,326	709	Peacham	
Mount Anthony		2,343	714	Bennington	
Tiny Mountain		2,320	707	Mount Holly	
Bowen Mountain		2,303	702	Eden	
Burnt Mountain		2,257	688	Marshfield	
Hardwood Mountain		2,244	684	Marshfield	
Cherry Knoll		2,236	682	Killington	
Barton Mountain		2,235	681	Barton	
Fletcher Mountain		2,150	655	Fletcher	
Bean Mountain		2,136	651	Eden	
Marshfield Mountain		2,119	646	Marshfield	
Sugarloaf Mountain		2,115	645	Warren	
Spruce Peak		2,040	622	Manchester	
Stimson Mountain		2,000	610	Bolton	
Central Mountain		1,995	608	Marlboro	
Deer Mountain		1,988	606	Peacham	
Owlshead Mountain		1,952	595	Peacham	
Drew Mountain		1,932	589	Marshfield	
Haystack Mountain (Pawlet)		1,919	585	Pawlet	
Split Rock Mountain		1,890	576	Granby	
Gile Mountain		1,873	571	Norwich	
Little Deer Mountain		1,759	536	Peacham	
The Fox Cobble		1,587	484	Rutland County	
Buffalo Mountain		1,555	474	Caledonia County	
Mays Mountain		1,522	464	Marshfield	
Mount Ephraim		1,490	454	Springfield	
Snake Mountain		1,287	392	Addison	
Mount Tom		1,250	381	Woodstock	
Mount Philo		968	295	Charlotte	
Pease Mountain		820	250	Charlotte	

== Gallery ==
=== Mount Mansfield photos ===
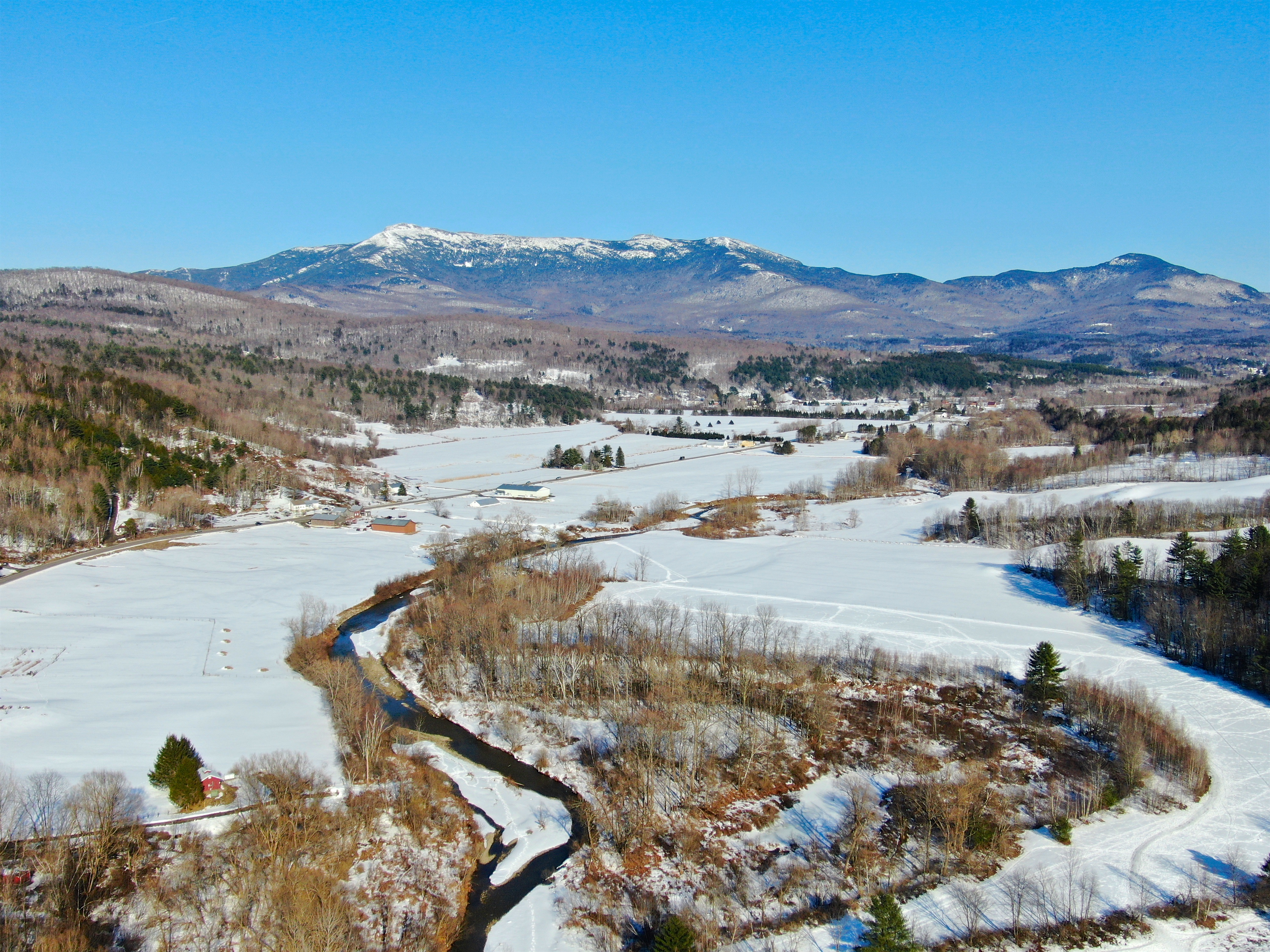
Aerial eastward view from Jericho

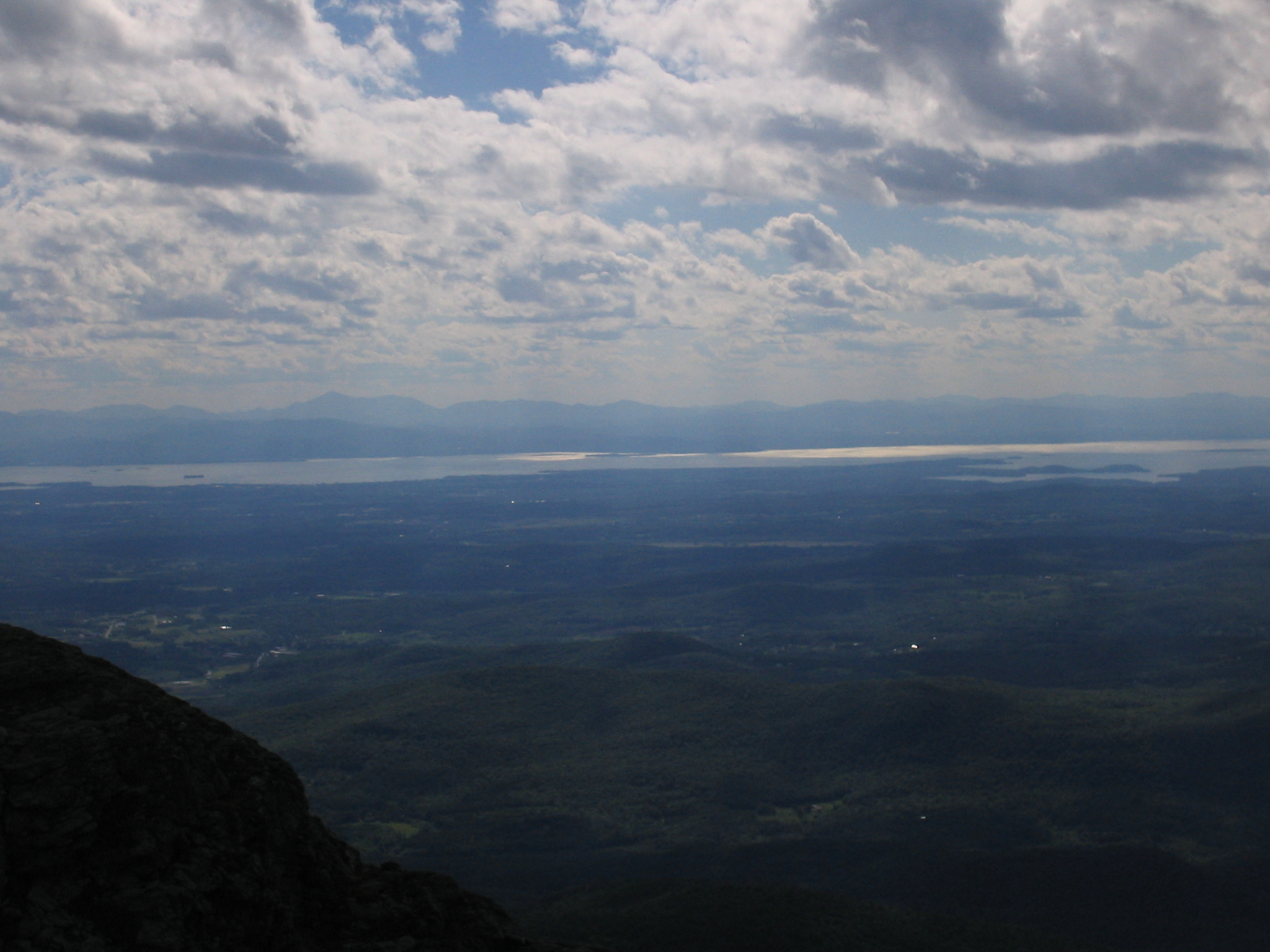
Top of Mount Mansfield facing west

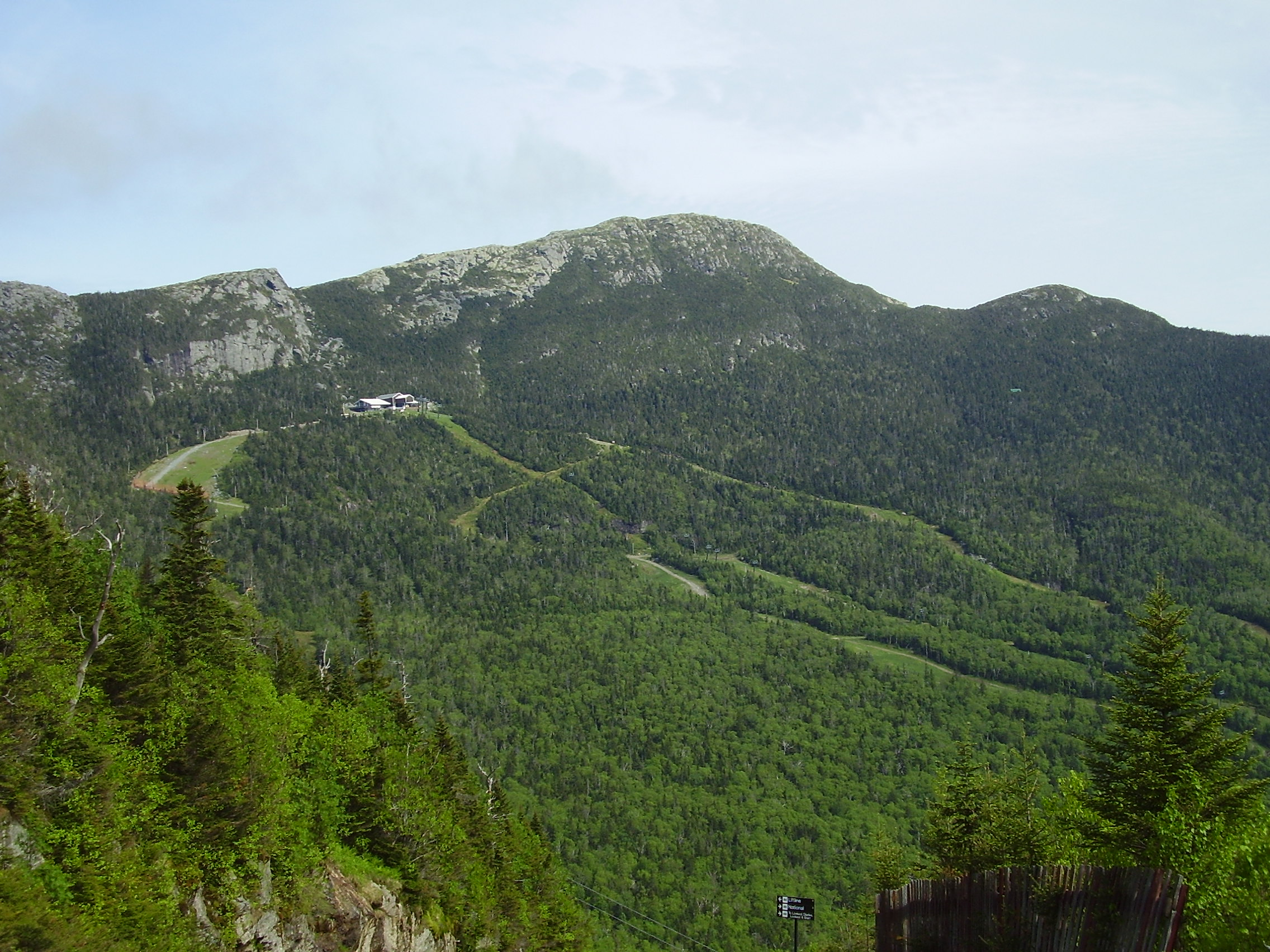
Eastward view of "The Chin"

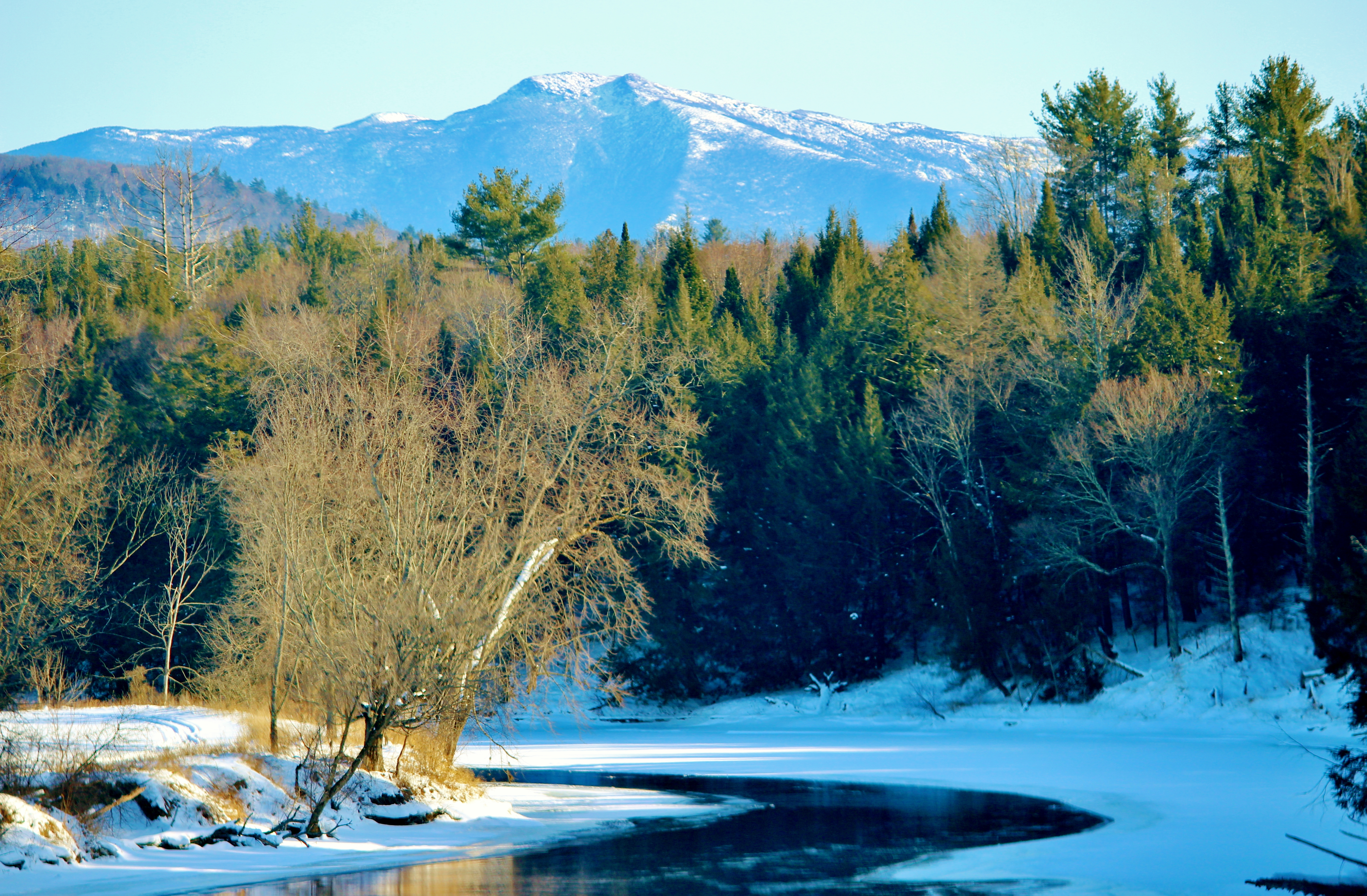
View from the northeast

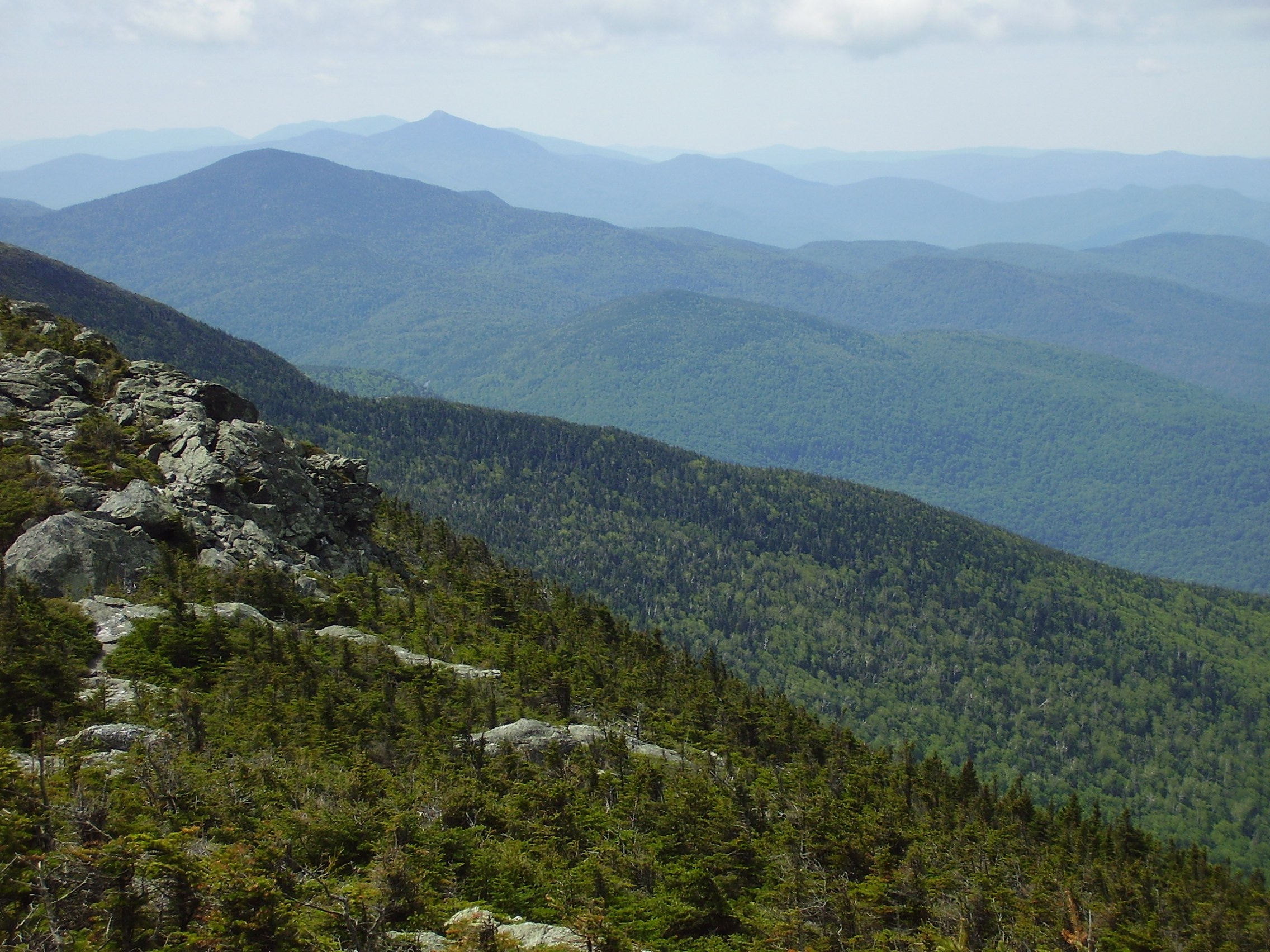
Top of Mount Mansfield facing south

=== Killington Peak photos ===
Top of Killington facing north

Top of Killington facing west

Top of Killington facing west

=== Camel's Hump Mountain Photos ===
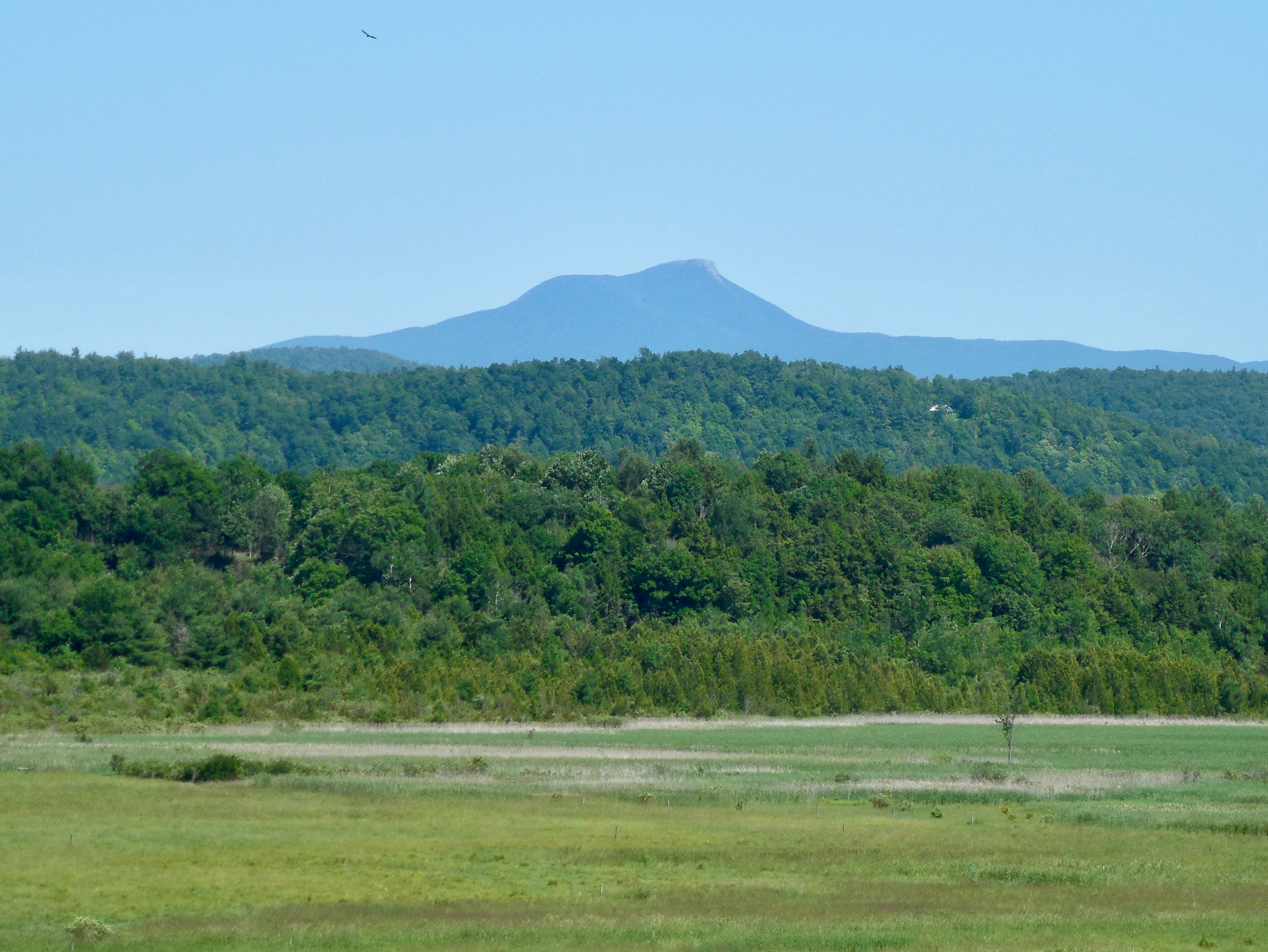
Eastward view of Camel's Hump Mountain from South Burlington

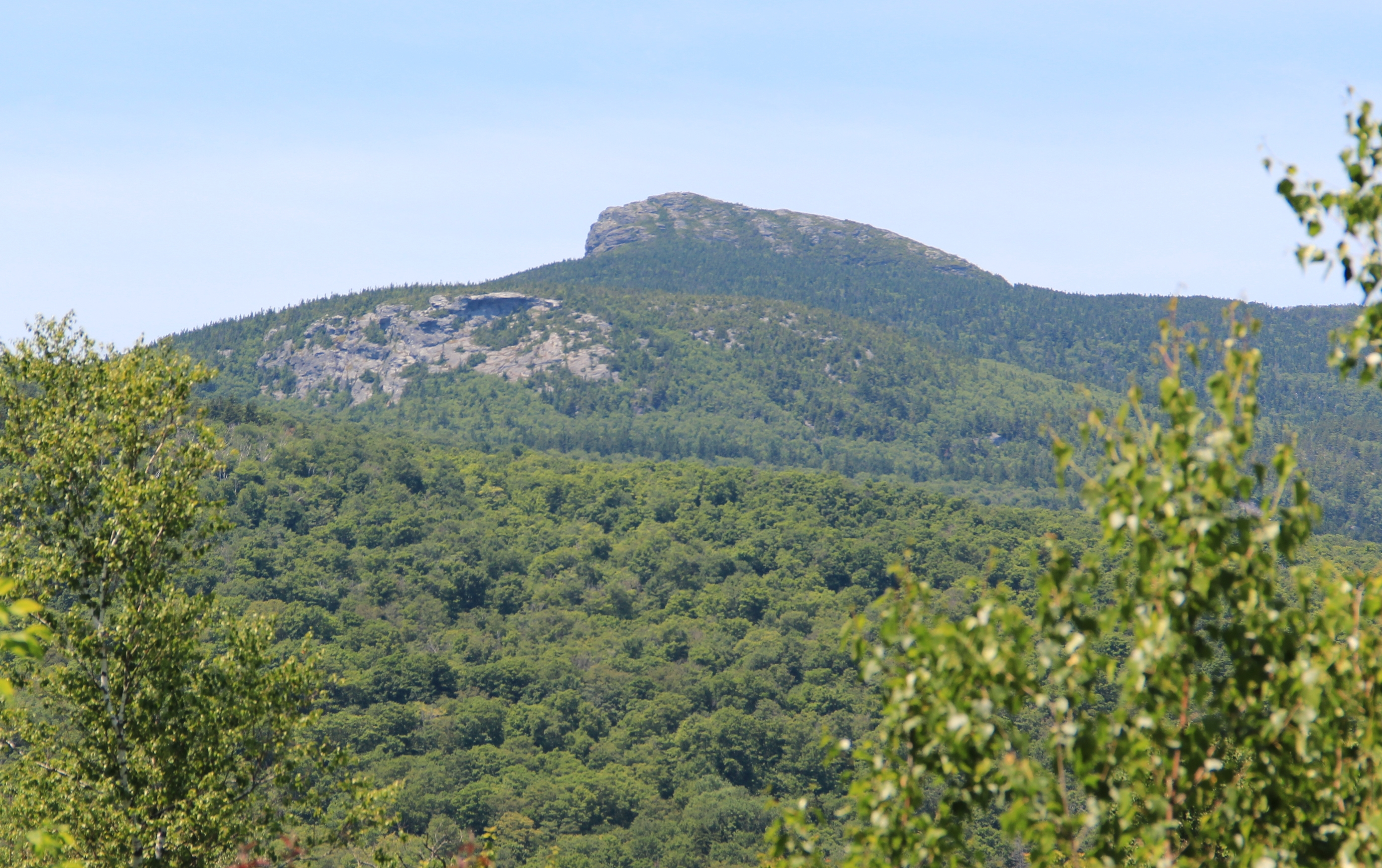
Westward view of the summit

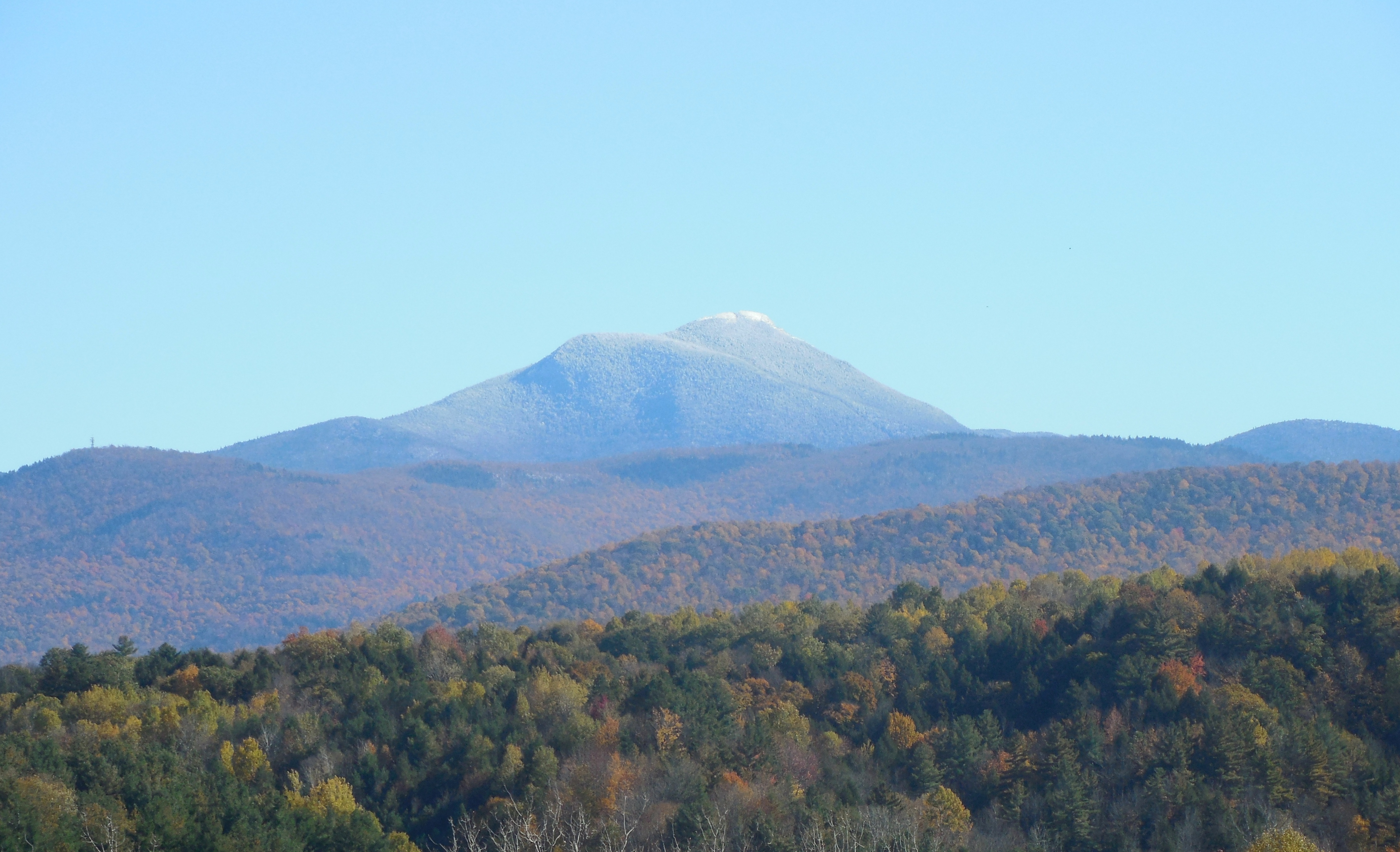
View from the northwest

=== Woodbury Mountain Photos ===
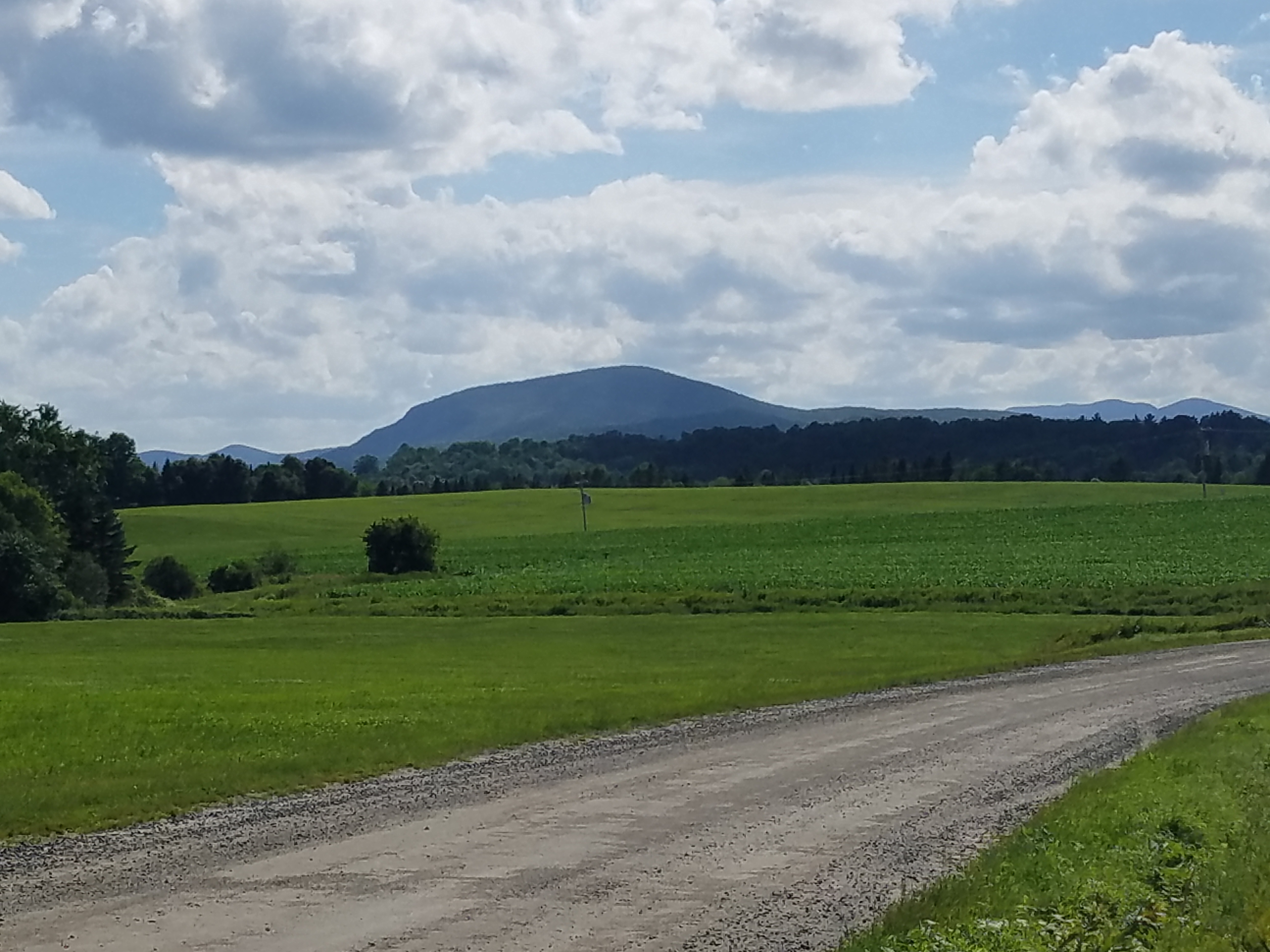
View of Woodbury from Hardwick Farms Road facing WSW

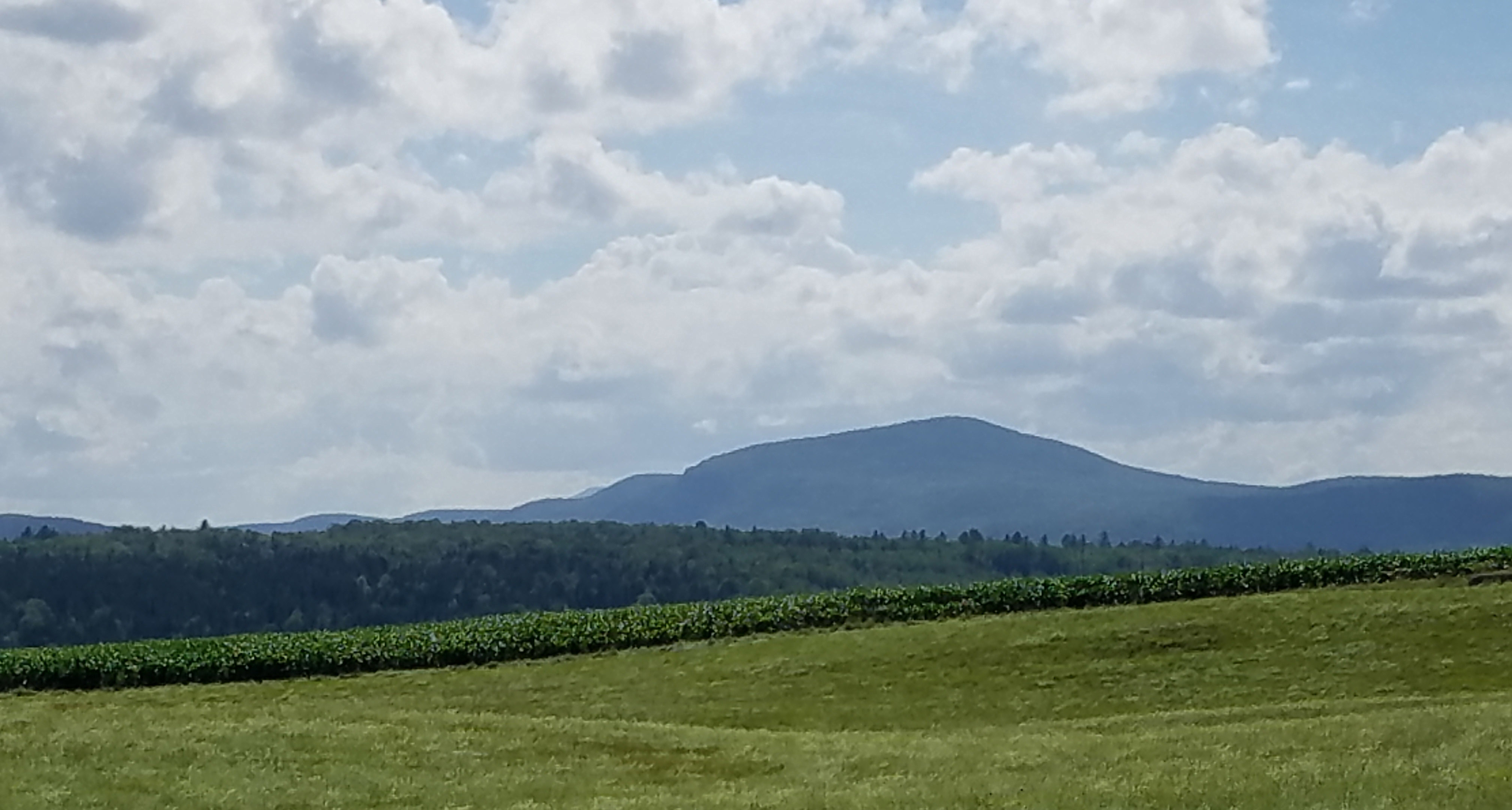
View from Mountain View Rd in Hardwick facing west

== See also ==
- List of mountains of the Appalachians
