= Lincoln Peak (Vermont) =

Mountain in Vermont, United States

- Location within Vermont

Highest point
- Elevation: 3,975 ft (1,212 m)
- Prominence: 135 ft (41 m)
- Coordinates: 44°07′37″N 072°55′41″W

Geography
- Country: United States
- State: Vermont
- County: Addison / Washington
- Town: Lincoln / Warren
- Parent range: Green Mountains
- Topo map: USGS Mount Ellen

Lincoln Peak is a mountain located on the border between Addison and Washington counties in the U.S. state of Vermont. It is part of the Lincoln Mountain section of the Green Mountains in the Green Mountain National Forest. Lincoln Peak is flanked to the southwest by Mount Abraham, and to the north by Nancy Hanks Peak, which was named after Abraham Lincoln's mother, Nancy Lincoln (née Hanks).

Lincoln Peak is named after Major General Benjamin Lincoln, who was instrumental in the American Revolutionary War victory at Saratoga. The summit is in the town of Lincoln, which is also named after Benjamin Lincoln.

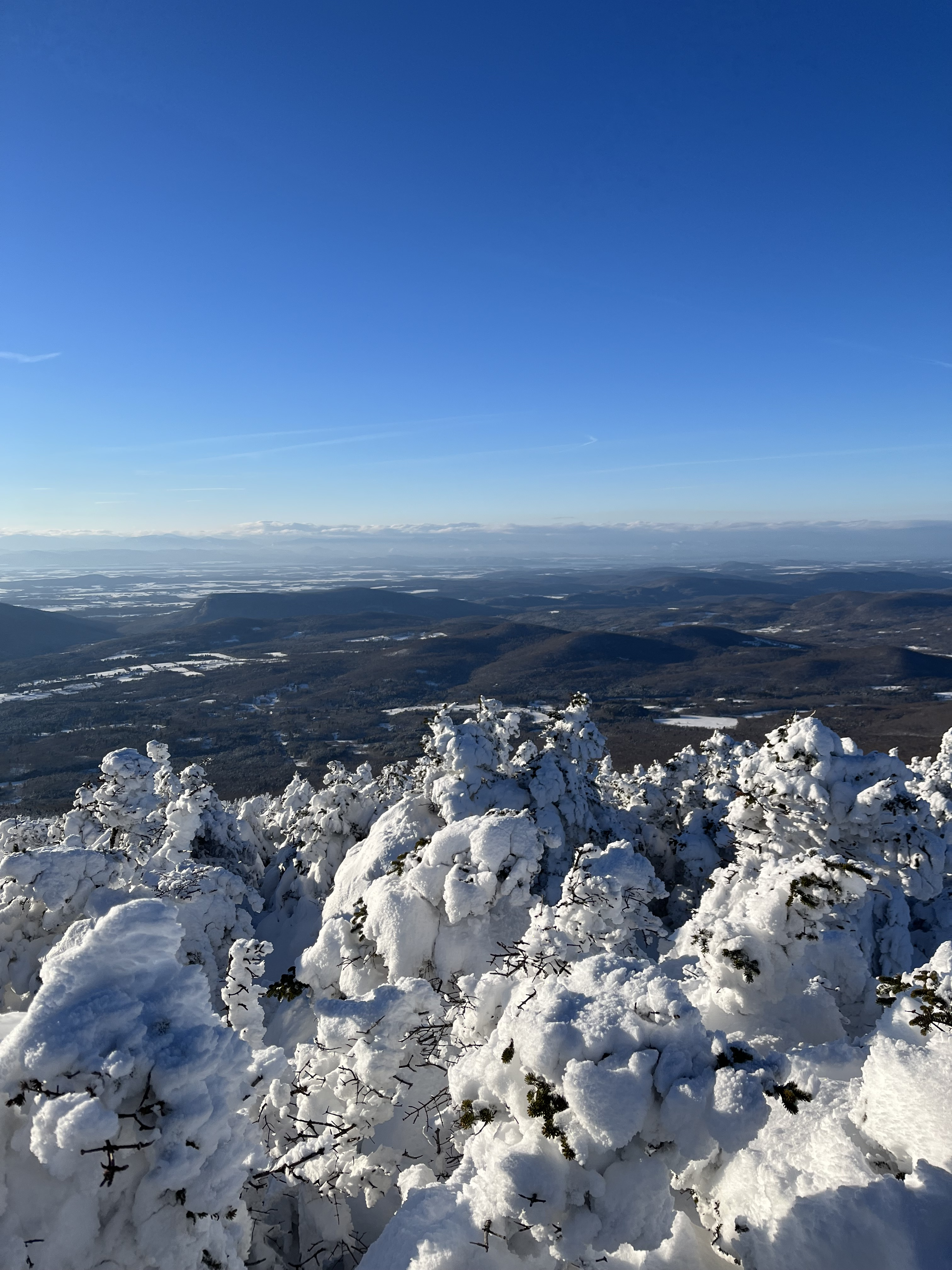
Lincoln Peak looking west

Lincoln Peak stands within the watershed of Lake Champlain, which drains into the Richelieu River in Québec, then into the Saint Lawrence River, and into the Gulf of Saint Lawrence. The south face of Lincoln Peak drains into Lincoln Brook, then into the Mad River, the Winooski River, and into Lake Champlain. The east side of Lincoln Peak drains into Bradley Brook, then into the Mad River. The northeast side of Lincoln Peak drains into Clay Brook, then into the Mad River. The west face of Lincoln Peak drains by various streams into Beaver Meadow Brook, then into the New Haven River, Otter Creek, and into Lake Champlain.

The Long Trail traverses the summit ridge of Lincoln Peak. Sugarbush Resort is on the northeast slope of the mountain.

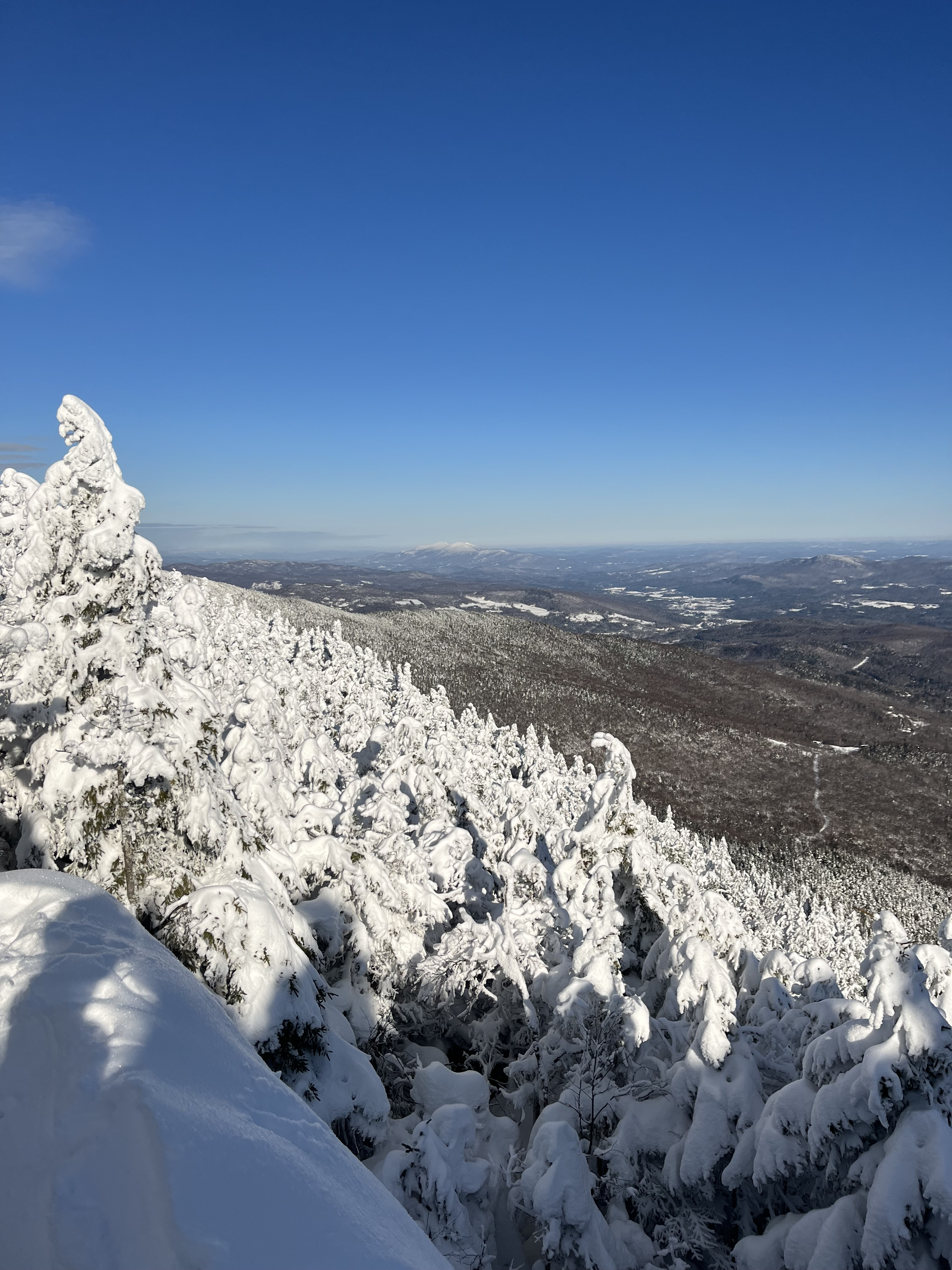
Summit Ridge looking at nearby Sugarbush Resort

== See also ==
- List of mountains in Vermont
