= Lincoln Gap (Vermont) =

- Interactive map of Lincoln Gap
- Elevation: 2,424 ft (739 m)
- Traversed by: Lincoln Gap Road

Third Approach
- Location: Lincoln (Addison County), Vermont, United States
- Range: Green Mountains
- Coordinates: 44°05′42″N 072°55′44″W
- Topo map: USGS Lincoln

Lincoln Gap is a mountain pass in the Green Mountains of the U.S. state of Vermont. The highest point of the gap is located in the town of Lincoln in Addison County approximately 0.5 miles (0.8 km) west of the boundary between Lincoln and the town of Warren in Washington County.

At 2,424 feet (739 m), Lincoln Gap is the highest vehicle-accessible mountain pass in Vermont. Lincoln Gap Road, which traverses the gap, is not plowed in the winter. The Lincoln half of the gap is unpaved gravel road, while the Warren half of the gap is paved, resulting in the distinction of Lincoln Gap being home to the steepest paved mile of public highway in the U.S., and is a popular challenge for cyclists.

On the east side, Lincoln Gap is drained by Lincoln Brook, which drains into the Mad River, the Winooski River, and into Lake Champlain. To the west, the gap is drained by Cota Brook, which drains into the New Haven River, Otter Creek, and into Lake Champlain. In turn, Lake Champlain drains into the Richelieu River in Québec, thence into the Saint Lawrence River, and into the Gulf of Saint Lawrence.

The Long Trail, a 272-mile (438-km) hiking trail running the length of Vermont, crosses Lincoln Gap between Mount Grant 3.9 miles (6.3 km) to the south and Mount Abraham 2.6 miles (4.2 km) to the north. The Breadloaf Wilderness lies directly south of the gap.
