= Bolton Mountain (Vermont) =

Mountain in Vermont, United States

Highest point
- Elevation: 3680+ ft (1122+ m) NGVD 29
- Prominence: 1,780 ft (540 m)
- Coordinates: 44°26′57″N 72°50′22″W

Geography
- Location: Chittenden County, Vermont
- Parent range: Green Mountains
- Topo map: USGS Bolton Mountain

Bolton Mountain is a mountain located in Chittenden County, Vermont. Bolton is flanked to the north by Mount Mayo.

Bolton Mountain stands within the watershed of Lake Champlain, which drains into Canada's Richelieu River, the Saint Lawrence River, and into the Gulf of Saint Lawrence. The northeast slopes of Bolton Mountain drain into Miller Brook, thence into the Little River, the Winooski River, and into Lake Champlain. The southeast slopes of Bolton Mountain drain into Cotton Brook, thence into the Little River. The south end of Bolton drains into Joiner Brook, thence into the Winooski River. The west slopes of Bolton drain into Mill Brook, thence into the Winooski River. The northwest slopes of Bolton drain into Lee River, thence into Browns River, the Lamoille River, and into Lake Champlain.

The Long Trail, a 272-mile (438-km) hiking trail running the length of Vermont, crosses the summit of Bolton Mountain.

== Climate ==
Climate data for Bolton Mountain 44.4523 N, 72.8409 W, Elevation: 3,396 ft (1,035 m) (1991–2020 normals)
Month	Jan	Feb	Mar	Apr	May	Jun	Jul	Aug	Sep	Oct	Nov	Dec	Year
Mean daily maximum °F (°C)	19.1 (−7.2)	20.7 (−6.3)	28.6 (−1.9)	42.4 (5.8)	56.0 (13.3)	64.3 (17.9)	68.2 (20.1)	66.6 (19.2)	60.5 (15.8)	47.3 (8.5)	34.5 (1.4)	24.6 (−4.1)	44.4 (6.9)
Daily mean °F (°C)	11.2 (−11.6)	12.9 (−10.6)	21.0 (−6.1)	34.1 (1.2)	47.8 (8.8)	57.0 (13.9)	61.4 (16.3)	59.8 (15.4)	53.2 (11.8)	40.6 (4.8)	28.1 (−2.2)	17.8 (−7.9)	37.1 (2.8)
Mean daily minimum °F (°C)	3.3 (−15.9)	5.1 (−14.9)	13.4 (−10.3)	25.9 (−3.4)	39.6 (4.2)	49.6 (9.8)	54.7 (12.6)	53.1 (11.7)	45.9 (7.7)	33.9 (1.1)	21.8 (−5.7)	11.1 (−11.6)	29.8 (−1.2)
Average precipitation inches (mm)	5.28 (134)	4.83 (123)	5.47 (139)	5.92 (150)	6.30 (160)	7.23 (184)	6.77 (172)	6.33 (161)	6.06 (154)	7.22 (183)	6.04 (153)	6.24 (158)	73.69 (1,871)
Source: PRISM Climate Group

== See also ==
- List of mountains in Vermont
