= Mount Grant (Vermont) =

Mountain in Vermont, United States

- Location within Vermont

Highest point
- Elevation: 3,623 ft (1,104 m)
- Prominence: 663 ft (202 m)
- Listing: Mountains of Vermont
- Coordinates: 44°03′08″N 072°55′33″W

Geography
- Country: United States
- State: Vermont
- County: Addison
- Town: Lincoln
- Parent range: Presidential Range
- Topo map: USGS Lincoln Mountain Quad

Mount Grant is a mountain in the Green Mountains in the U.S. state of Vermont. Located in the Breadloaf Wilderness of the Green Mountain National Forest, its summit is in the town of Lincoln in Addison County. The mountain is named after Ulysses S. Grant, former President of the United States. Mount Grant is one of five peaks in Vermont's Presidential Range.

== Drainage basin ==
Mount Grant stands within the watershed of Lake Champlain, which drains into the Richelieu River in Québec, the Saint Lawrence River, and then eventually into the Gulf of Saint Lawrence. The northeast side of Mount Grant drains into Stetson Brook, thence into the Mad River, the Winooski River, and into Lake Champlain. The south and west sides of Mount Grant drain into the New Haven River, thence into Otter Creek, and into Lake Champlain.

== Hiking ==
The Long Trail traverses the summit of Mount Grant at 3,623 feet (1,104 m). From the summit, there are views south across the Breadloaf Wilderness towards Bread Loaf Mountain. The Cooley Glen Trail, whose trailhead is in the town of Lincoln, terminates at the Cooley Glen Shelter on the Long Trail after 3.2 miles (5.1 km). From the shelter, Mount Grant is 0.8 miles (1.3 km) to the north while Mount Cleveland is 0.5 miles (0.8 km) to the south.

== See also ==
- Mount Grant (Nevada)
