= Mount Abraham (Vermont) =

Mountain in Vermont, U.S.

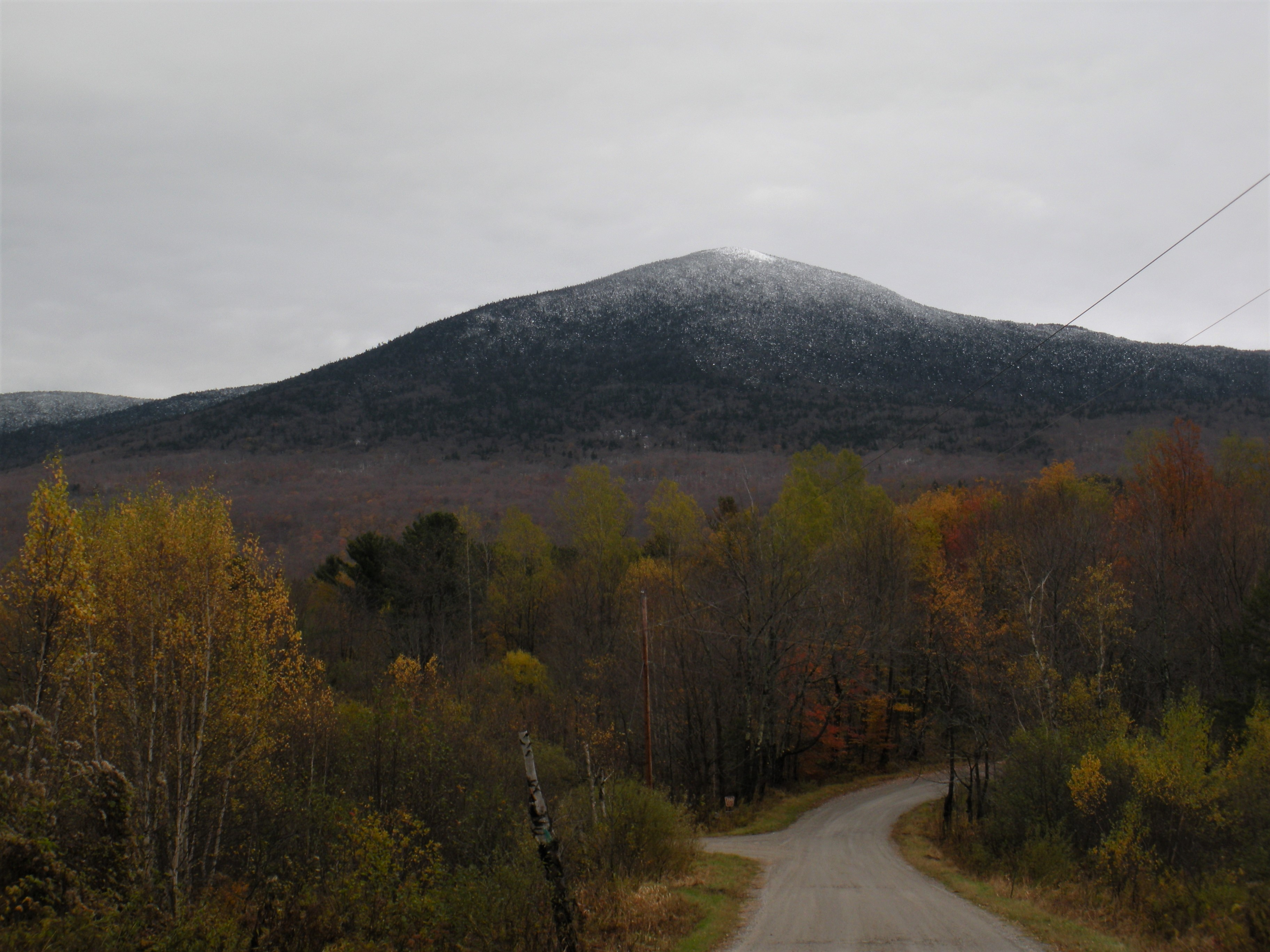
- View of Mount Abraham from the west

Highest point
- Elevation: 4,006 ft (1,221 m)
- Prominence: 286 ft (87 m)
- Listing: New England 4,000 footers
- Coordinates: 44°07′14″N 072°56′10″W

Geography
- Location within Vermont
- Country: United States
- State: Vermont
- County: Addison
- Town: Lincoln
- Parent range: Presidential Range, Green Mountains
- Topo map: USGS Lincoln Mountain Quad

Mount Abraham (known as Mount Abe to locals) is a mountain in the Green Mountains in the U.S. state of Vermont. Located in the Green Mountain National Forest, its summit is in the town of Lincoln in Addison County, but its eastern slopes extend into the town of Warren in Washington County. The mountain is named after Abraham Lincoln, former president of the United States. It is one of five peaks in Vermont's Presidential Range.

At 4,006 feet (1,221.0 m), Mount Abraham is the highest point in Addison County, the fifth highest peak in Vermont, and one of the hundred highest peaks in New England. Its summit supports a small amount of alpine tundra vegetation.

== History ==
Chartered in 1780, the town of Lincoln is named after American Revolutionary War hero Benjamin Lincoln, not Abraham Lincoln as might be expected. Nearby Lincoln Peak is also named after Benjamin Lincoln. In Addison County, all place names containing the word “Lincoln” pre-date the birth of Abraham Lincoln.

At various times, Mount Abraham has been known as Lincoln Mountain or Potato Hill. The latter name, which dates back to at least 1875, may have coexisted with the current name for decades. In 1897, a United States Coast and Geodetic Survey team wrote "Potato Hill is sometimes called Mount Abraham Lincoln but it is better known by the former name." The latter name, which clashes with local usage of the surname "Lincoln," was eventually abbreviated to "Mount Abraham," a name that dates back to at least 1921 when the United States Geological Survey began using that name on various maps. Those maps show Lincoln Mountain to be the range of peaks from Mount Abraham to Mount Ellen.

On June 28, 1973, a pilot flying from Twin Mountain, New Hampshire to Newburgh, New York was maneuvering to avoid clouds when he hit trees on the north ridge of Mount Abraham. He and two passengers survived the plane crash. However, parts of the plane (a Cessna 182N, registration number N92431) are still on the mountain today.

== Climate ==
Climate data for Mount Abraham 44.1235 N, 72.9226 W, Elevation: 3,625 ft (1,105 m) (1991–2020 normals)
Month	Jan	Feb	Mar	Apr	May	Jun	Jul	Aug	Sep	Oct	Nov	Dec	Year
Mean daily maximum °F (°C)	19.1 (−7.2)	21.5 (−5.8)	28.6 (−1.9)	44.5 (6.9)	57.0 (13.9)	65.1 (18.4)	69.4 (20.8)	68.1 (20.1)	62.2 (16.8)	49.8 (9.9)	35.1 (1.7)	24.8 (−4.0)	45.4 (7.5)
Daily mean °F (°C)	11.1 (−11.6)	13.1 (−10.5)	20.8 (−6.2)	34.9 (1.6)	47.9 (8.8)	56.9 (13.8)	61.6 (16.4)	60.2 (15.7)	53.8 (12.1)	41.6 (5.3)	28.2 (−2.1)	17.8 (−7.9)	37.3 (2.9)
Mean daily minimum °F (°C)	3.0 (−16.1)	4.7 (−15.2)	13.0 (−10.6)	25.3 (−3.7)	38.8 (3.8)	48.8 (9.3)	53.9 (12.2)	52.4 (11.3)	45.3 (7.4)	33.3 (0.7)	21.4 (−5.9)	10.8 (−11.8)	29.2 (−1.5)
Average precipitation inches (mm)	4.49 (114)	3.85 (98)	4.58 (116)	5.01 (127)	5.31 (135)	6.44 (164)	6.14 (156)	6.09 (155)	5.15 (131)	6.15 (156)	4.70 (119)	5.29 (134)	63.2 (1,605)
Source: PRISM Climate Group

== Drainage basin ==
Mount Abraham stands within the watershed of Lake Champlain, which drains into the Richelieu River in Québec, the Saint Lawrence River, and then eventually into the Gulf of Saint Lawrence. The southeast slopes of Mount Abraham drain into Lincoln Brook, then into the Mad River, the Winooski River, and into Lake Champlain. The east slopes drain into Bradley Brook, a tributary of the Mad River. The southwest face of Mount Abraham drains into the headwaters of the New Haven River, Otter Creek, and into Lake Champlain. The northwest face of Mount Abraham drains into Beaver Meadow Brook, a tributary of the New Haven River.

== Hiking ==
The Long Trail traverses the summit of Mount Abraham. A popular day hike begins and ends where the Long Trail crosses Lincoln Gap Road in the town of Lincoln. From Lincoln Gap, the summit is 2.6 miles (4.2 km) north on the Long Trail. Alternatively, the Battell Trail, whose trailhead is also in Lincoln, terminates at the Battell Shelter after 2.0 miles (3.2 km). From the shelter, the summit is 0.9 miles (1.4 km) north on the Long Trail.

Mount Abraham offers one of the best panoramas on the entire Long Trail. Beyond the Champlain Valley 10 miles (16 km) to the west, stands Mount Marcy and the Adirondack Mountains. In the opposite direction, one can see the White Mountains of New Hampshire 80 miles (129 km) to the east. To the south, Killington Peak may be seen 40 miles (64 km) away.

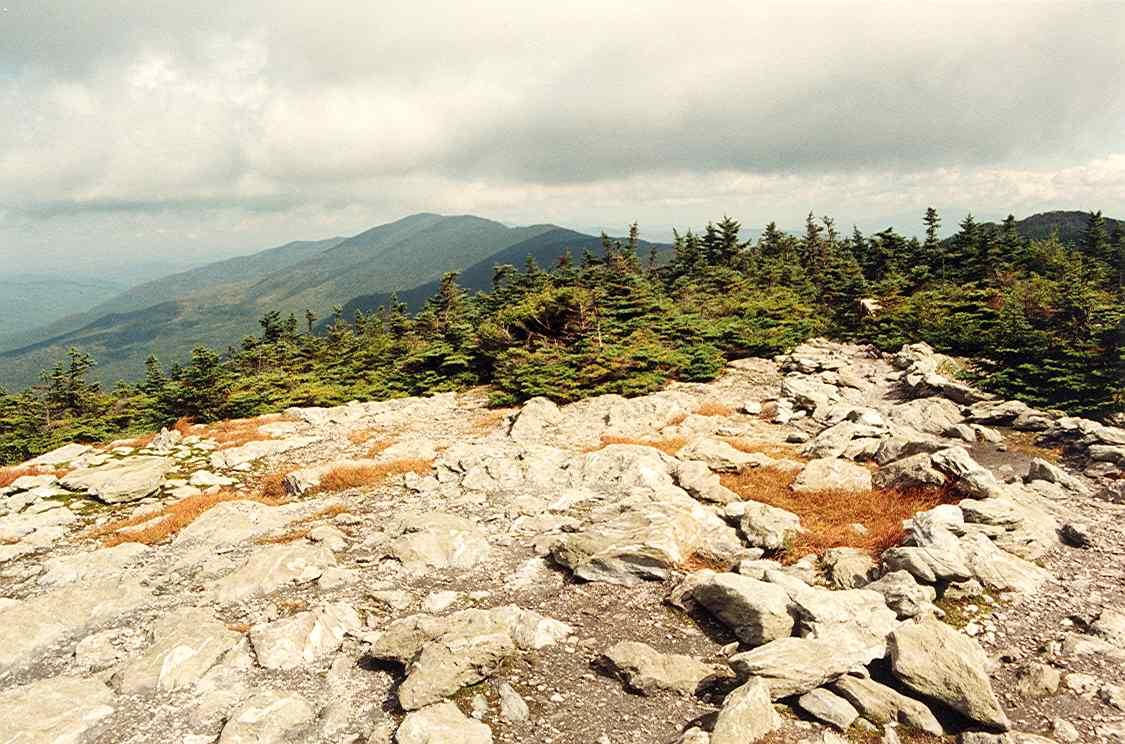
Mount Ellen seen from Mount Abraham

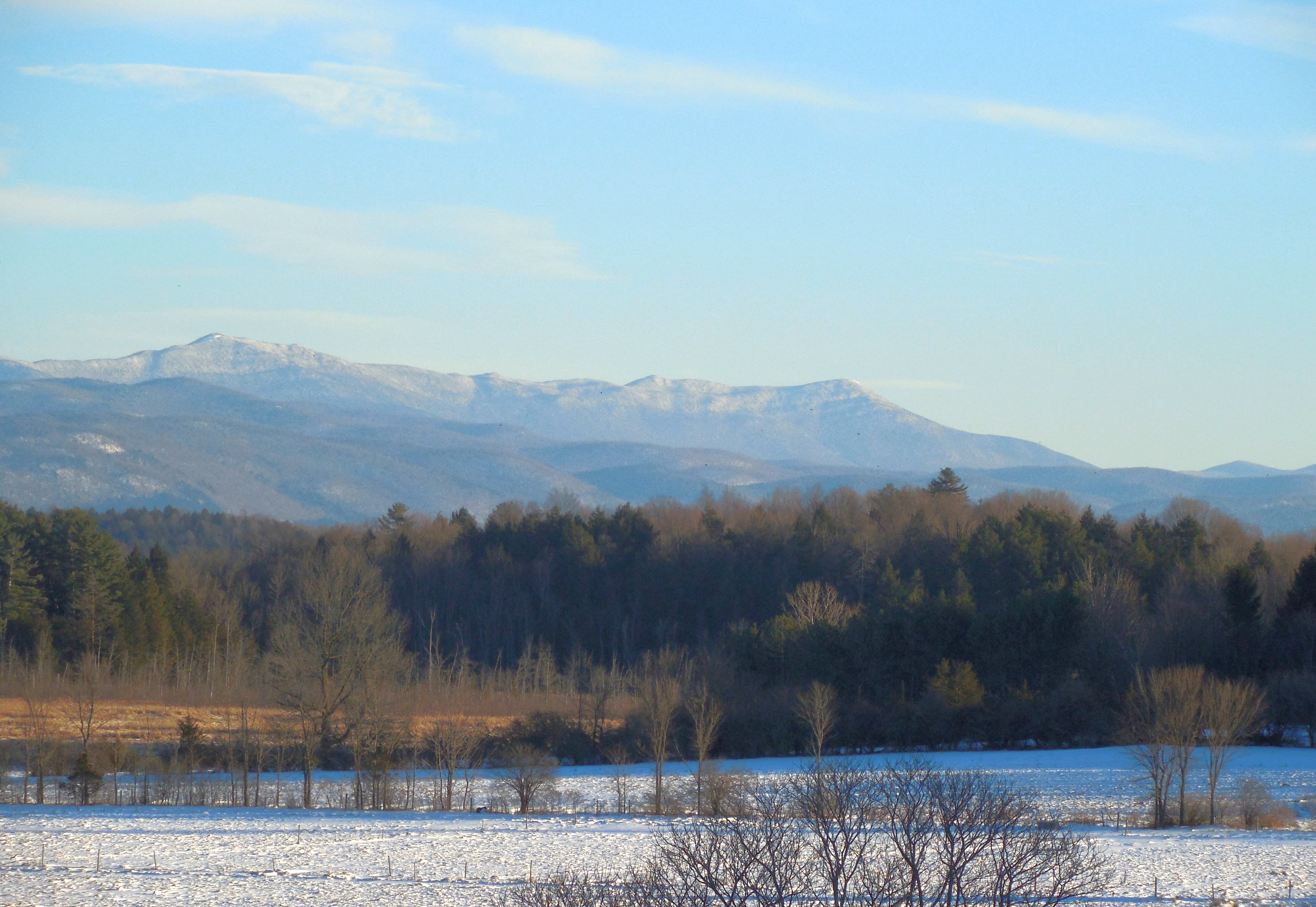
View of the Mount Abraham summit (right) and Mount Ellen (left) along the southerly portion of the Green Mountain Range

== See also ==
- List of mountains of Vermont
- List of New England Hundred Highest
