= Bread Loaf Mountain =

Mountain in Vermont, US

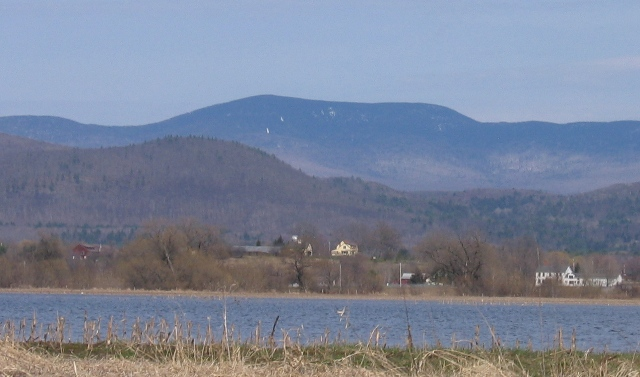
- A distant view of Bread Loaf from Otter Creek, April 2007

Highest point
- Elevation: 3,822 ft (1,165 m)
- Prominence: 1,430 ft (440 m)
- Listing: 1. 87 New England 100 Highest
- Coordinates: 44°00′08″N 072°56′30″W

Geography
- Location: Addison County, Vermont
- Parent range: Green Mountains
- Topo map(s): USGS Bread Loaf and Lincoln

Climbing
- Easiest route: Maintained hiking trail

Bread Loaf Mountain is a mountain located in Addison County, Vermont, in the Breadloaf Wilderness in the Green Mountain National Forest. The mountain is part of the central Green Mountains. Bread Loaf Mountain is flanked to the northeast by Mount Wilson, part of Vermont's Presidential Range.

The southeast end of Bread Loaf Mountain drains into the headwaters of the White River, thence into the Connecticut River which drains into Long Island Sound in Connecticut. The east side of Bread Loaf Mountain drains into the headwaters of the New Haven River, thence into Otter Creek, Lake Champlain, Canada's Richelieu River, the Saint Lawrence River, and ultimately into the Gulf of Saint Lawrence.

The northern part of the west side of Bread Loaf Mountain drains into Blue Bank Brook, thence into the New Haven River. The southern part of the west side of Bread Loaf Mountain drains into Sparks Brook and the Middle Branch of the Middlebury River, thence into the Middlebury River at Ripton and Otter Creek.

The Long Trail, a 272-mile (438 km) hiking trail running the length of Vermont, crosses the southeastern flank of Bread Loaf Mountain. The actual summit is reached by a spur path from the Long Trail that leads northwest to an outlook. This section of the Long Trail may be accessed in various ways: via the Skyline Pond Trail off USFS 59 (Steam Mill Road), via the Clark Brook Trail off USFS 55, or via the Emily Proctor Trail off USFS 201.

== See also ==
- Bread Loaf School of English
- Bread Loaf Writers' Conference
- Bread Loaf, Vermont
- List of mountains in Vermont
