= Green Mountain Parkway =

Proposed scenic parkway in the United States

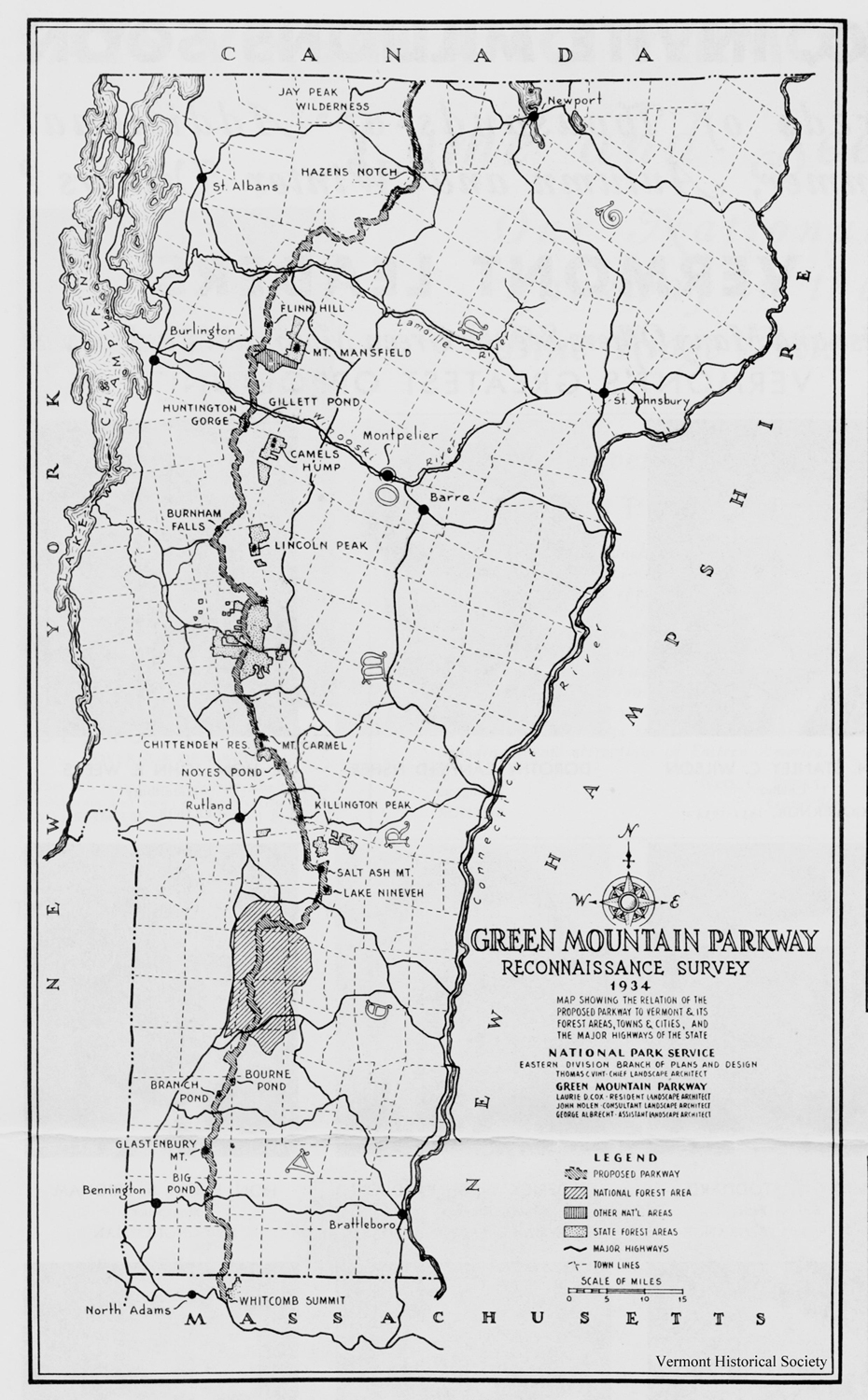
1934 map of the proposed highway route and national park

The Green Mountain Parkway was a proposed scenic highway in the U.S. state of Vermont. The project was first introduced around 1934, and was proposed to run for 260 mi (420 km) over ridges of the Green Mountains. The parkway was modeled after the Blue Ridge Parkway or Skyline Drive in the American South. In 1935, the project was approved, and a referendum was held to choose between a 1936 or 1941 effective date; voters chose the latter date. By 1937, the parkway project became unpopular, and the 1937 legislature repealed the Green Mountain Parkway Act, effectively shuttering the proposal.

== History ==
The Green Mountain Parkway was proposed in 1933, during the Great Depression. It proposed as a large project to offer employment to the 16,000 unemployed Vermonters at the time, and to stimulate the economy, including by increasing tourism and recreation in the state. The project involved a 260-mile highway among a 50,000-acre national park. The state of Vermont would be required to provide $500,000 for purchasing rights of way. Colonel William Wilgus, former chief engineer for the New York Central Railroad, first proposed the highway.

By April 1934, support grew for the project, and U.S. President Franklin D. Roosevelt convinced Congress to approve $50,000 for a ten-month feasibility study for the parkway.

The highway project was divisive among local residents. Prominent Vermont supporters included Governor Stanley C. Wilson; the Vermont Chamber of Commerce and its executive secretary, James P. Taylor, one of the founders of the Green Mountain Club and an early promoter of the Long Trail; the State Planning Board; the editors of The Burlington Free Press, Brattleboro Reformer, and Bennington Banner; and Vermont's notable resident authors Dorothy Canfield Fisher and Sarah N. Cleghorn. Arguments in favor of the project included that the highway would open up the state to the rest of the country, breaking from its reputation as isolated and provincial. Supporters also noted that the state would receive $18 million for the project, while only contributing $500,000. These funds as well as benefits from the completed project were seen as fruitful for the state economy.

Some residents opposed the project, including Speaker of the Vermont House of Representatives Ernest E. Moore, the Rutland Herald, and author Sinclair Lewis, along with members of the Green Mountain Club, maintainers of the Long Trail. Reasons included that the state had recently provided flood relief bonds following the Great Vermont Flood of 1927, and the project would add to the state debt. Southern Vermonters who operated tourism and recreational facilities were opposed to the highway, fearing that it would drain some visitor business to sites northward. As well, Vermonters disliked that the national park and parkway would divide the state in two parts. Dog whistles were used to voice opposition to Jews and other foreigners visiting Vermont. Lieutenant Governor and later Governor George Aiken, as well as poet Arthur Wallace Peach prominently stated that the parkway could make Vermont like the Catskills, what they called the Jewish Alps.

Act 17 of the Vermont State Legislature's 1935 Special Session was passed on December 14, 1935, approving a national park, establishing jurisdiction over it, and allocating funds to begin the project. A state-wide referendum was then held, asking voters to set an April 1, 1936, effective date (a yes vote) or April 1, 1941 (a no vote). On town meeting day (March 3) in 1936, the public voted "no", 42,318 to 30,897. Chittenden, Franklin, Grand Isle, Lamoille, and Washington counties had predominantly voted "yes". The 1937 legislature was then able to repeal the Green Mountain Parkway Act, through Act 243 passed February 5, 1937. Interstate highways began construction elsewhere in Vermont in the 1950s with federal passage of the Federal Aid Highway Act of 1956.

== See also ==
- List of state highways in Vermont
