= Lincoln, Vermont =

- Town
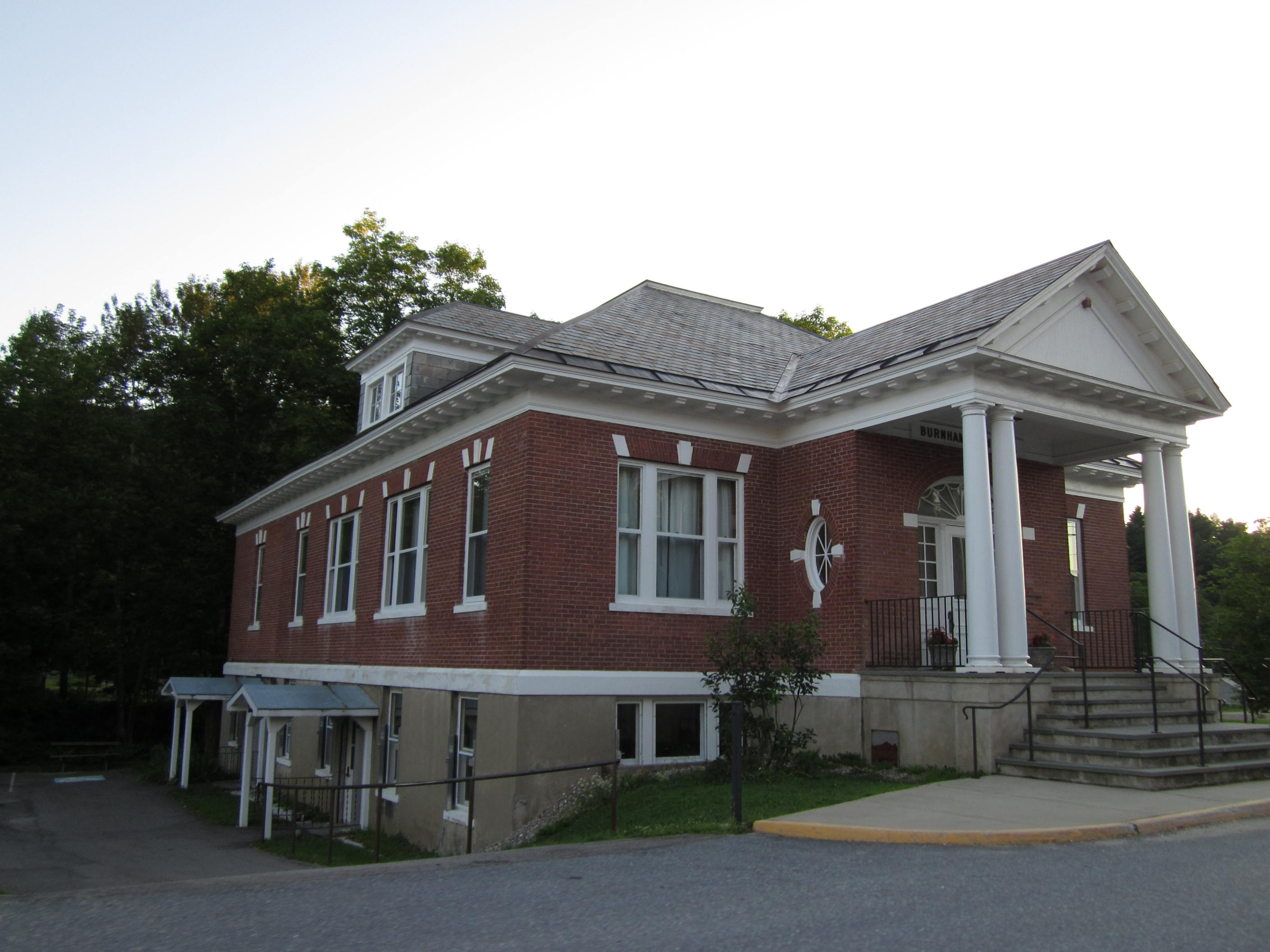
- Town Office, Burnham Hall in Lincoln

- Seal

- Location in Addison County and the state of Vermont
- Coordinates: 44°06′31″N 73°00′49″W
- Country: United States
- State: Vermont
- County: Addison
- Chartered: 1780
- Settled: 1790
- Organized: 1798
- Communities: Lincoln; Downingville; South Lincoln; West Lincoln

Area
  - Total: 44.6 sq mi (115.5 km^{2})
  - Land: 44.4 sq mi (115.0 km^{2})
  - Water: 0.19 sq mi (0.5 km^{2})
- Elevation: 1,273 ft (388 m)

Population (2020)
  - Total: 1,323
  - Density: 30/sq mi (11.5/km^{2})
- Time zone: UTC-5 (Eastern (EST))
  - Summer (DST): UTC-4 (EDT)
- ZIP code: 05443
- Area code: 802
- FIPS code: 50-40075
- GNIS feature ID: 1462135
- Website: www.lincolnvermont.org

Lincoln is a town in Addison County, Vermont, United States. Lincoln is at the base of Mount Abraham in the Green Mountains. It was settled by Quakers in the late 18th century. The population was 1,323 at the 2020 census. Lincoln is known for its rural beauty and its proximity to two Vermont ski areas, Mad River Glen and Sugarbush.

== Geography ==
Lincoln is in northeastern Addison County in the Green Mountains. The Long Trail runs along the crest of the Green Mountains near the town's eastern border, with elevations ranging from 2,430 feet (740 m) at Lincoln Gap to 4,006 feet (1,221 m) at the summit of Mount Abraham. The lowest elevation in town is 840 feet (260 m) above sea level near West Lincoln, where the New Haven River exits the town.

The Lincoln Gap Road crosses the Green Mountains at Lincoln Gap, connecting the village of Lincoln on the west with the town of Warren to the east. But it is only open in the summer, so the town is principally accessed via Bristol. The village of South Lincoln is in the southern part of the town, along the New Haven River. There are no numbered state highways in Lincoln.

According to the United States Census Bureau, the town has an area of 44.6 square miles (115.5 km^{2}), of which 44.4 square miles (115.0 km^{2}) are land and 0.19 square miles (0.5 km^{2}), or 0.43%, are water.

== Demographics ==
Historical population
Census	Pop.	Note	%±
1800	97		—
1810	255		162.9%
1820	278		9.0%
1830	639		129.9%
1840	770		20.5%
1850	1,057		37.3%
1860	1,070		1.2%
1870	1,174		9.7%
1880	1,368		16.5%
1890	1,255		−8.3%
1900	1,152		−8.2%
1910	980		−14.9%
1920	841		−14.2%
1930	800		−4.9%
1940	745		−6.9%
1950	577		−22.6%
1960	481		−16.6%
1970	599		24.5%
1980	870		45.2%
1990	974		12.0%
2000	1,214		24.6%
2010	1,271		4.7%
2020	1,323		4.1%
U.S. Decennial Census

As of the census of 2000, there were 1,214 people, 462 households, and 339 families residing in the town. The population density was 27.6 people per square mile (10.7/km^{2}). There were 566 housing units at an average density of 12.9 per square mile (5.0/km^{2}). The racial makeup of the town was 97.53% White, 0.16% African American, 0.33% Native American, 0.66% Asian, 0.08% Pacific Islander, and 1.24% from two or more races. Hispanic or Latino of any race were 1.24% of the population.

There were 462 households, out of which 37.2% had children under the age of 18 living with them, 61.3% were married couples living together, 8.9% had a female householder with no husband present, and 26.6% were non-families. 19.9% of all households were made up of individuals, and 7.1% had someone living alone who was 65 years of age or older. The average household size was 2.63 and the average family size was 3.02.

In the town, the age distribution of the population shows 27.1% under the age of 18, 5.9% from 18 to 24, 29.1% from 25 to 44, 27.1% from 45 to 64, and 10.8% who were 65 years of age or older. The median age was 39 years. For every 100 females, there were 101.3 males. For every 100 females age 18 and over, there were 100.7 males.

The median income for a household in the town was $45,750, and the median income for a family was $51,369. Males had a median income of $30,455 versus $25,125 for females. The per capita income for the town was $21,092. About 4.3% of families and 5.9% of the population were below the poverty line, including 9.4% of those under age 18 and 1.5% of those age 65 or over.

== History ==
Lincoln was chartered to Colonel Benjamin Simonds and 64 associates on November 9, 1780. As commander of the Massachusetts militia, Simonds fought at the Battle of Bennington in 1777. He named the new town in honor of his commanding officer, Major General Benjamin Lincoln, who played a vital role in getting the militia to Vermont. General Lincoln was respected and well liked by his contemporaries.

Like Ferrisburgh and several other Addison County towns, Lincoln was settled by members of the Society of Friends, or Quakers. The first Quakers settled in an area known as Mud Flat about 1795. As other Quakers joined the original group, the area became known as Quaker Stand. The meeting house is gone and the Society has dispersed, but one part of Lincoln village is still called Quaker Street. Lincoln's town government was officially organized in 1798, when the first town meeting was held in the log cabin of early settler Jedediah Durfee.

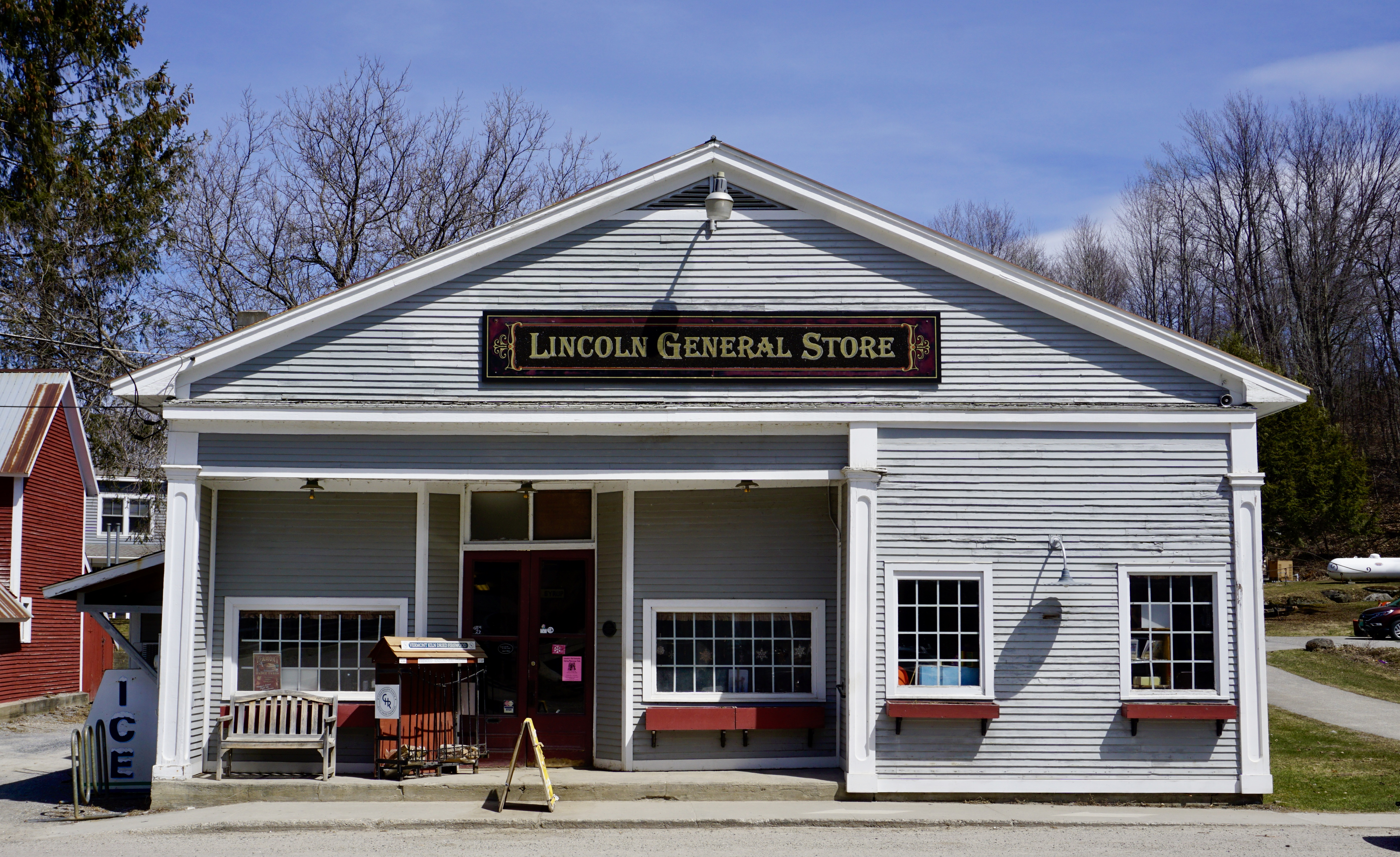
The Lincoln General Store in Lincoln Center, a main community hub.

Until the latter part of the 20th century, Lincoln's economy centered around smallholder agriculture, ironworks, and mills. The earliest export products were potash and timber, sold by homesteading farmers after clearing their land. The town's population and economy peaked in the 1880s, when 15 lumber mills in town made shingles and clapboard, employing around 100 men. Dairies and potato farming comprised much of the rest of the town's industry. Lincoln also grew to comprise the settlements of Downingsville and West, South, and Center Lincoln, bringing it to its present area of 44 square miles. The town's proximity to the New Haven River has caused destructive floods in its history, in 1830, 1869, 1938, 1976, and 1998.

In 1919, Lincoln-born businessman Walter S. Burnham left a significant endowment to the town in his will, resulting in the creation of the Burnham Trust, a fund intended to "be expended for educational, charitable, and musical purposes." The Trust provided funding for the construction of Burnham Hall, a community meeting place and formerly the town library, as well as establishing a scholarship fund for future Lincoln students. Burnham Hall remains the site of Lincoln's town meeting.

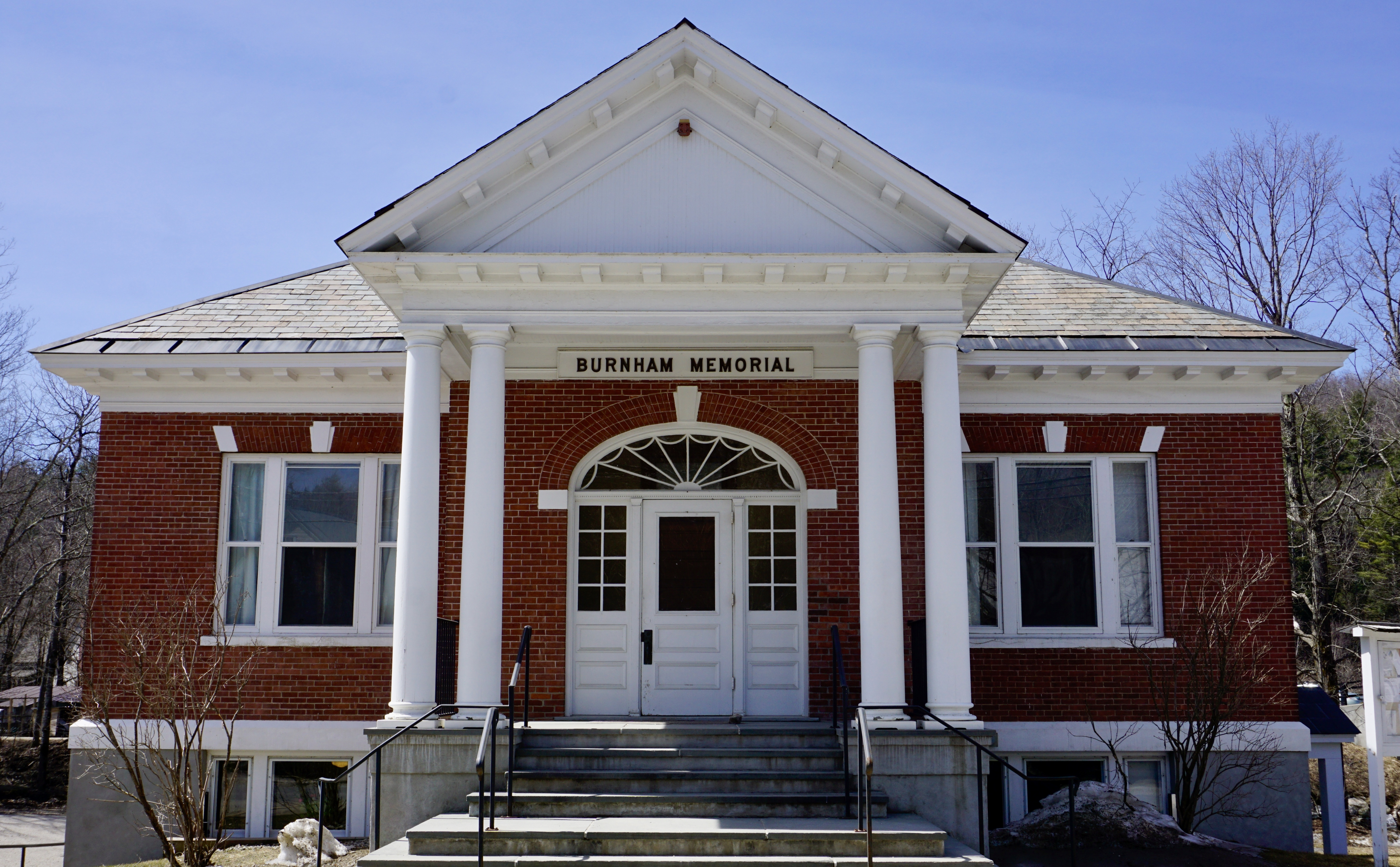
Burnham Hall in Lincoln, the town's central meeting place.

Lincoln underwent a significant contraction in the mid-20th century, as its resource-based livelihoods dried up and families moved away. Dairy farms were unable to compete with larger, centralized enterprises elsewhere in the state and country. For Lincoln, the industry's death knell came in the 1980s, when the federal government offered to buy out smaller farms in an attempt to raise the price of milk and thereby make the industry more profitable; Lincoln's last dairy closed in 1992. Most of the mills and other industry also closed by the end of the century, though one pallet mill remains in operation. In 1968 Lincoln lost its post office (and thus its ZIP code) when postal services were transferred to Bristol.

In the 21st century, Lincoln's population has rebounded almost to its peak. Its proximity to the Green Mountains, tranquility, and well-supported community services have made it attractive as a residential community. Most working-age adults commute to jobs in neighboring towns, but Lincoln still has a general store, hotel, and multiple small-batch maple syrup producers, with some larger producers (the largest has 35,000 trees tapped).

On September 11, 2010, the first Tibetan Buddhist nunnery in North America was consecrated in Lincoln.

== Community ==
Lincoln is home to a community church, the United Church of Lincoln, which is in the center of town at the bottom of Quaker Street. The Lincoln General Store serves as a main community hub, as there is no post office or gas station in town.

== Lincoln School District ==
The Lincoln Community School, built by town residents in 1957, plays a central role in the identity of the community.

Until 2018, the education of the Lincoln students was governed by the Lincoln School District which was part of a regional supervisory union, the Addison Northeast Supervisory Union (ANESU) -- a multi-town regional cooperative where the Lincoln students attended a regional middle and high school with other neighboring towns.

In 2012, with declining student enrollment across the state, Vermont began experiencing a push for school district consolidation which was later codified into statute with the passage of Act 46 in 2015. Following a merger study, in 2018 each of the independent school districts of Addison Northeast Supervisory Union merged into a single multi-town district—the Mount Abraham Unified School District (MAUSD). This change in governance resulted in a change in local control from the single districts within each community and shared services within a supervisory union, to a single multi-town district governance model.

Re-establishment as Lincoln School District

In 2021, the Mount Abraham Unified School District engaged in a further merger study with a neighboring district Addison Northwest School District. In the course of that study, it was proposed that the cost savings of the merger would include closure of some of the smaller schools, including Lincoln Community School. The merger proposal was voted down by the communities that make up MAUSD and ANWSD. As a direct result of the study committee's suggestion to some of the schools, community members in those communities who would be affected by this decision, began exploring withdrawal from their district.

In December 2021, the residents of Lincoln began exploring the idea of Lincoln withdrawing from MAUSD. After tremendous effort and the support of voters in Lincoln and the surrounding towns, by declaration of the Vermont State Board of Education on May 18, 2022, the Lincoln School District was reconstituted as a prekindergarten through grade 12 school district. On that same date, Lincoln was approved for the withdrawal from the Mount Abraham Unified School District (MAUSD).

After a statutory period of transition, the Lincoln School District was reconsituted as a supervisory district and began full operations on July 1, 2023.

District leadership

The newly form Lincoln School District is led by a 5-member school board. The first school board was led by Chair Jennifer Oldham and included board members Mary Gemignani, Rob Backlund, Abigail Reynolds, and Leah Calderon-Guthe. In 2023 Oldham stepped down as chair and the Board appointed Jeanne Albert as Board Chair. The following year, Reynolds and Calderon-Guthe did not seek re-election and following a town election Deirdre Kelley and Peg Sutlive joined the Board. Albert, Gemignani, Backlund, Kelley, and Sutlive serve as the current School Board of the Lincoln Supervisory School District.

In July 2023, Madelyn Crudo-Burke, who supported Lincoln through the transition, became the first school superintendent. Following Crudo-Burke's departure in December 2023, Dr. Amy Cole assumed the role and serves as the current superintendent of the Lincoln School District.

Under the leadership of the Lincoln School Board and district leadership, the community of Lincoln has successfully passed the school budget each year since re-establishment as a supervisory district.

Educational Program

The Lincoln School District continues to operate the Lincoln Community School which provided educational programing for the K-6 students of Lincoln. The middle/high school students of Lincoln access their education through our 7-12 Choice/Tuition Program and the Pre-K students of Lincoln access programming as outlined on Act 166 universal preschool legislation.

== Notable people ==
- Chris Bohjalian, author, resident of Lincoln
- Frederick Howard Bryant, federal judge, born in Lincoln
- Abram Hatch, Mormon church leader and Utah government official, born in Lincoln
- William Eldridge Odom, U.S. Army lieutenant general, maintained a vacation home in Lincoln
- Elizabeth M. Ready, member of the Vermont Senate and Vermont Auditor of Accounts, resident of Lincoln
- Ronald Rood, naturalist, author, radio commentator, resided in Lincoln
- Roger Shattuck, author and scholar, resident of Lincoln
