= Green Mountains =

Subrange of the Appalachian Mountains in Quebec, Canada and Vermont, United States

Coordinates: 44°47′30″N 72°34′58″W

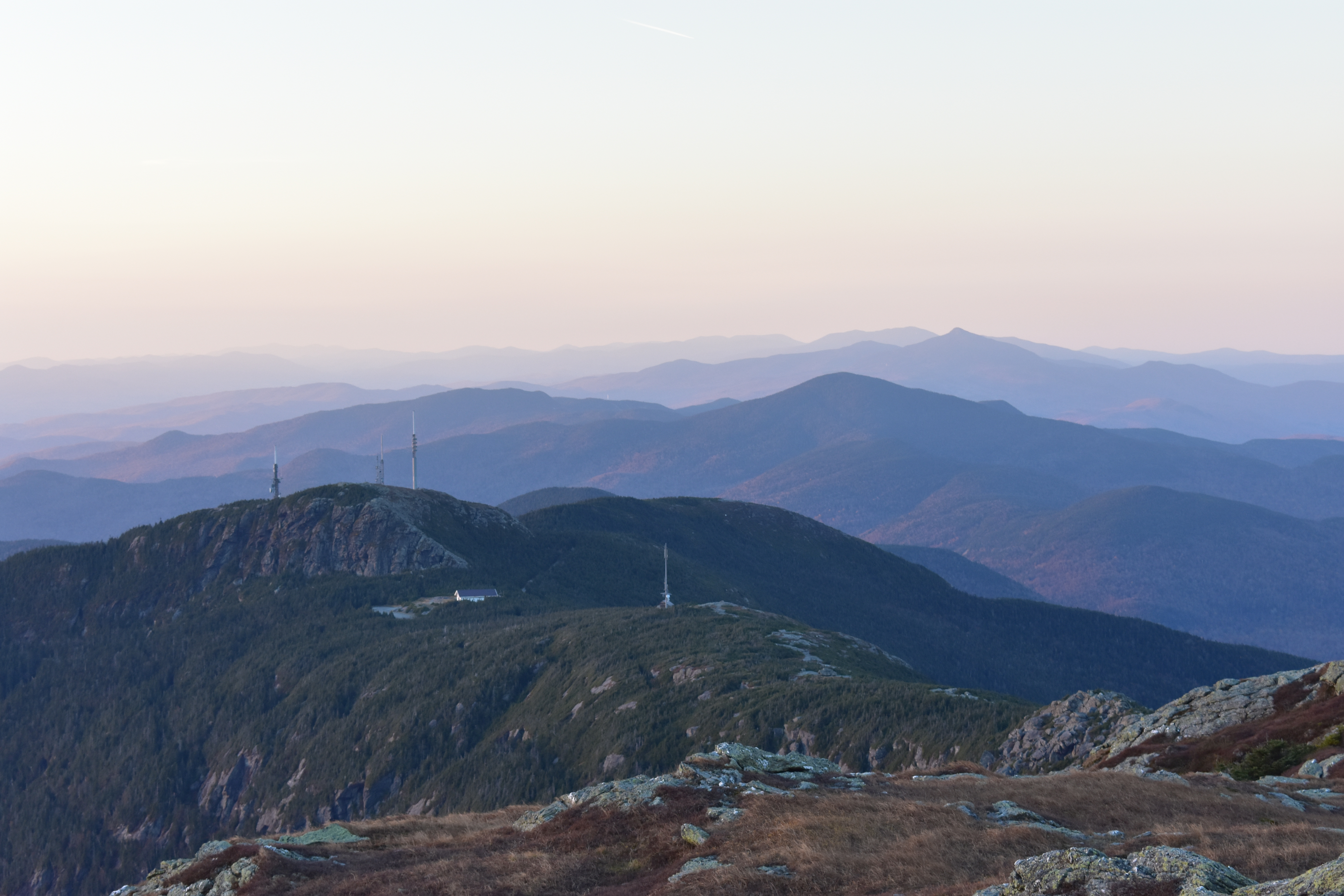
- Green Mountains looking south from the summit of Mount Mansfield, the highest point in the range

Highest point
- Peak: Mount Mansfield

Geography
- Location: Vermont
- Parent range: Appalachian Mountains

The Green Mountains are a mountain range in the U.S. state of Vermont and are a subrange of the Appalachian Mountains. The range runs primarily south to north and extends approximately 250 miles (400 km) from the border with Massachusetts to the border with Quebec, Canada. The part of the same range that is in Massachusetts and Connecticut is known as the Berkshires or the Berkshire Hills (with the Connecticut portion, mostly in Litchfield County, locally called the Northwest Hills or Litchfield Hills) and the Quebec portion is called the Sutton Mountains, or Monts Sutton in French.

All mountains in Vermont are often referred to as the "Green Mountains". However, other ranges within Vermont, including the Taconic Mountains in southwestern Vermont and the Northeastern Highlands, are not geologically part of the Green Mountains.

== Peaks ==
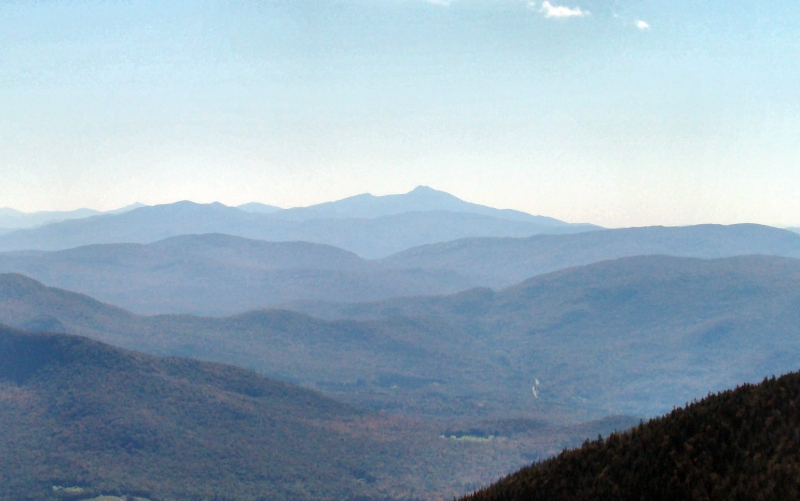
Green Mountains looking south from Jay Peak

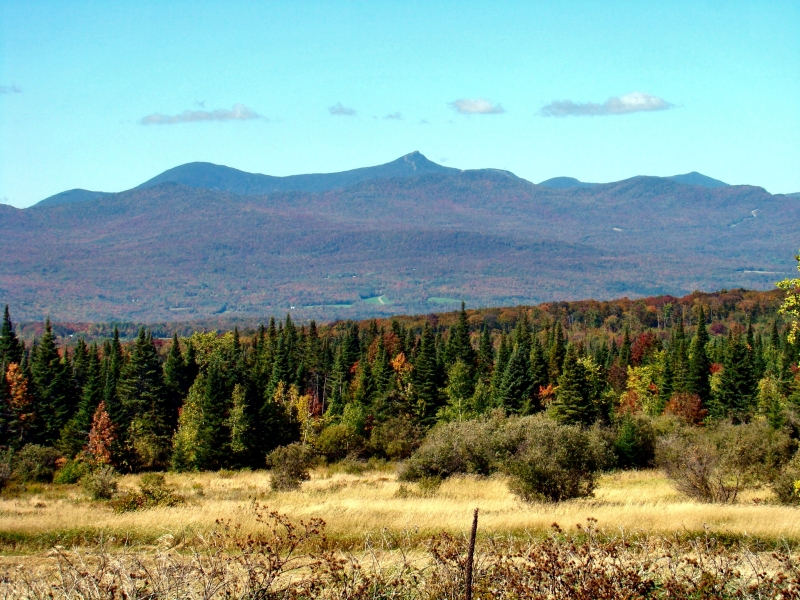
Jay Peak, located at the northern end of the Green Mountains in Vermont

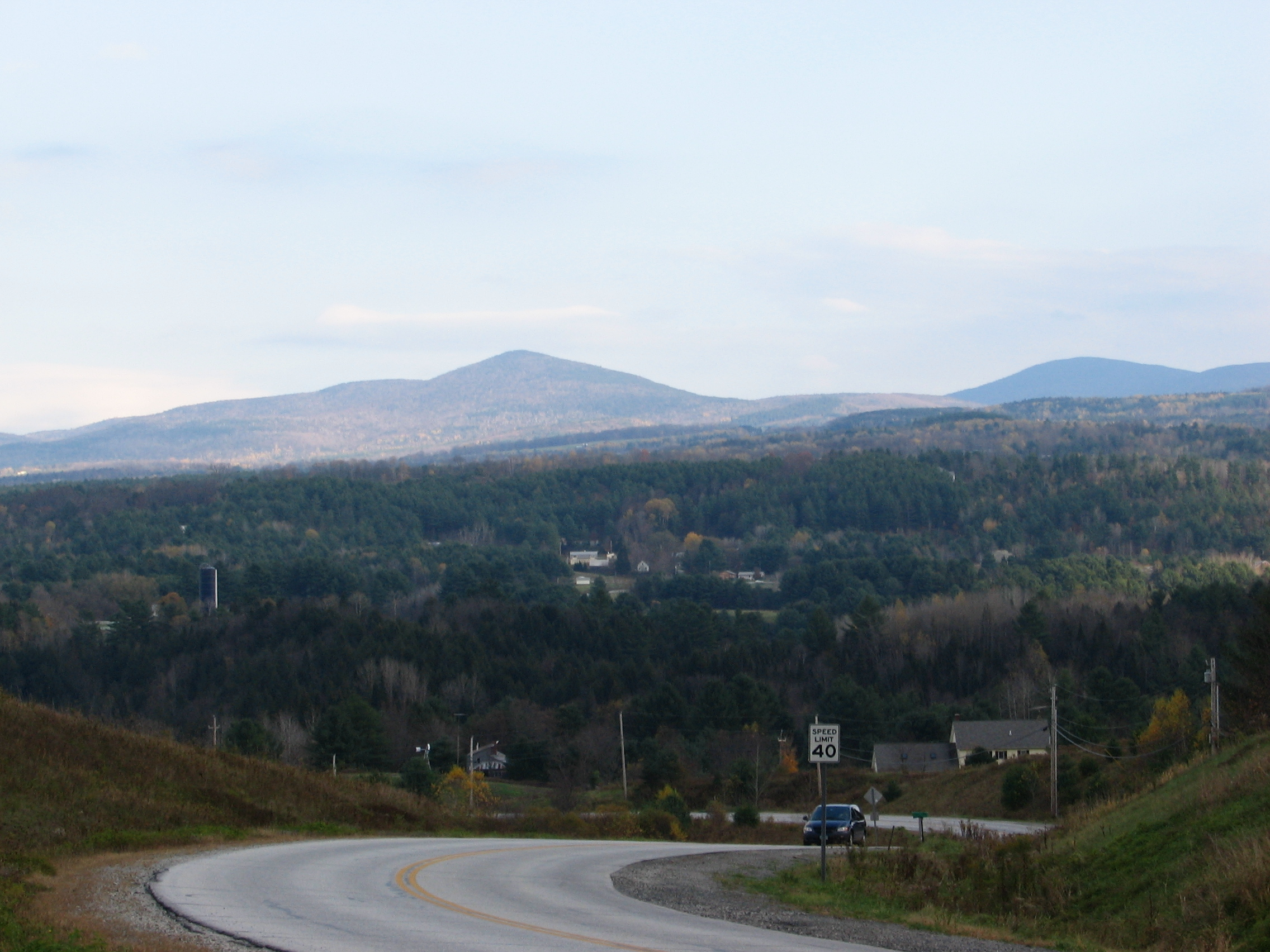
Green Mountains outside of Montpelier, Vermont

The best-known mountains—for reasons such as high elevation, ease of public access by road or trail (especially the Long Trail and Appalachian Trail), or with ski resorts or towns nearby—in the range include:

1. Mount Mansfield, 4,395 feet (1,340 m), the highest point in Vermont
2. Killington Peak, 4,241 feet (1,293 m)
3. Camel's Hump, 4,084 feet (1,245 m)
4. Mount Ellen, 4,083 feet (1,244 m)
5. Mount Abraham, 4,017 feet (1,224 m)
6. Pico Peak, 3,957 feet (1,206 m)
7. Stratton Mountain, 3,940 feet (1,200 m)
8. Jay Peak, 3,862 feet (1,177 m), receives the most snowfall on average in the eastern United States.
9. Bread Loaf Mountain, 3,835 feet (1,169 m)
10. Mount Wilson, 3,780 feet (1,150 m)
11. Glastenbury Mountain, 3,748 feet (1,142 m)
12. Burke Mountain, 3,280 feet (1,000 m)

The Green Mountains are part of the Appalachian Mountains, a range that stretches from Quebec in the north to Alabama in the south. The Green Mountains are part of the New England/Acadian forests ecoregion.

Three peaks—Mount Mansfield, Camel's Hump, and Mount Abraham—support alpine vegetation.

== Tourism ==
Some of the mountains are developed for skiing and other snow-related activities. Others have hiking trails for use in summer. Mansfield, Killington, Pico, and Ellen have downhill ski resorts on their slopes. All of the major peaks are traversed by the Long Trail, a wilderness hiking trail that runs from the southern to northern borders of the state and is overlapped by the Appalachian Trail for roughly 1/3 of its length.

== History ==
The Vermont Republic, also known as the Green Mountain Republic, existed from 1777 to 1791, at which time Vermont became the 14th state.

Vermont not only takes its state nickname ("The Green Mountain State") from the mountains, it is named after them. The French Monts Verts or Verts Monts is literally translated as "Green Mountains". This name was suggested in 1777 by Dr. Thomas Young, an American revolutionary and Boston Tea Party participant. The University of Vermont and State Agricultural College is referred to as UVM, after the Latin Universitas Viridis Montis (University of the Green Mountains).

== Geology and physiography ==
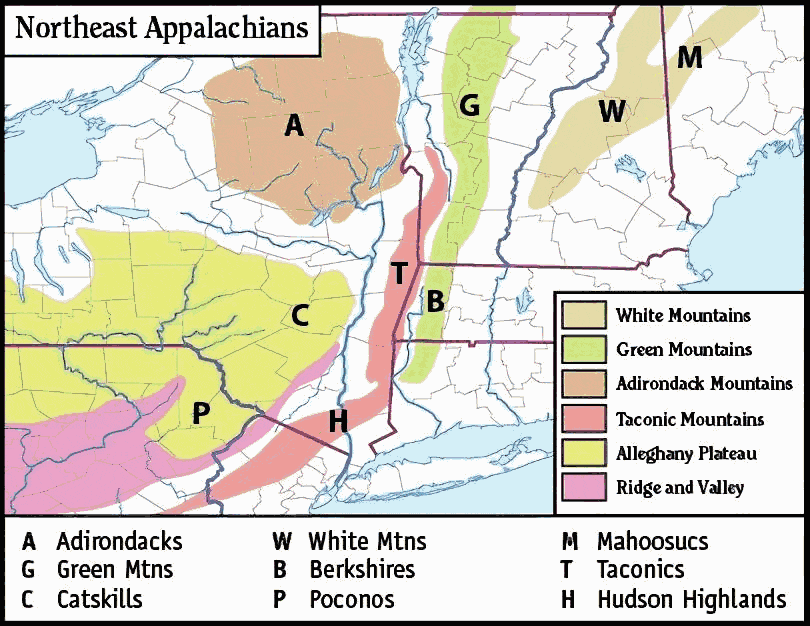
Map of the main regions of the northern Appalachians

The Green Mountains are a physiographic section of the larger New England province, which in turn is part of the larger Appalachian physiographic division.

== See also ==
- Green Mountain National Forest
- Green Mountain Parkway
- Green Mountain Boys—paramilitary infantry led by Ethan Allen that took Fort Ticonderoga during the American Revolution
- Green Mountain Club
- List of subranges of the Appalachian Mountains
