= List of school districts in Vermont =

This is a complete list of school districts in Vermont. Union school districts necessarily overlap (include) other, often town-based or village-based, school districts.

All Vermont school districts are independent governments. There are no K-12 public school systems in the state that are dependent on another layer of government like a city government.

Municipality	School district	Supervisory union
Addison	Addison Northwest Unified School District	Addison Northwest Supervisory Union
Albany	Lake Region Union Elementary-Middle School District	Orleans Central Supervisory Union
Albany	Lake Region Union High School District	Orleans Central Supervisory Union
Alburgh	Alburg School District	Grand Isle Supervisory Union
Andover	Green Mountain Unified School District	Two Rivers Supervisory Union
Arlington	Arlington School District	Southwest Vermont Supervisory Union
Athens	Bellows Falls Union High School District	Windham Northeast Supervisory Union
Athens	Windham Northeast Union Elementary School District	Windham Northeast Supervisory Union
Averill	Averill School District	Essex North Supervisory Union
Averys Gore	Averys Gore School District	Essex North Supervisory Union
Bakersfield	Northern Mountain Valley Unified Union School District	Franklin Northeast Supervisory Union
Baltimore	Green Mountain Unified School District	Two Rivers Supervisory Union
Barnard	Barnard School District	Windsor Central Supervisory Union
Barnard	Windsor Central Modified Union School District	Windsor Central Supervisory Union
Barnet	Caledonia Cooperative School District	Caledonia Central Supervisory Union
Barre (city)	Barre Unified Union School District	Barre Supervisory Union
Barre (town)	Barre Unified Union School District	Barre Supervisory Union
Barton	Lake Region Union Elementary-Middle School District	Orleans Central Supervisory Union
Barton	Lake Region Union High School District	Orleans Central Supervisory Union
Belvidere	Lamoille North Modified Union School District 58A	Lamoille North Supervisory Union
Belvidere	Lamoille North Modified Union School District 58B	Lamoille North Supervisory Union
Bennington	Mount Anthony Union High School District	Southwest Vermont Supervisory Union
Bennington	Southwest Vermont Union Elementary School District	Southwest Vermont Supervisory Union
Benson	Slate Valley Unified Union School District	Addison Rutland Supervisory Union
Berkshire	Northern Mountain Valley Unified Union School District	Franklin Northeast Supervisory Union
Berlin	Washington Central Unified Union School District	Washington Central Supervisory Union
Bethel	White River Unified District	White River Valley Supervisory Union
Bloomfield	Northeast Kingdom Choice School District	Essex North Supervisory Union
Bolton	Mount Mansfield Modified Union School District A	Chittenden East Supervisory Union
Bolton	Mount Mansfield Modified Union School District B	Chittenden East Supervisory Union
Bradford	Oxbow Unified Union School District	Orange East Supervisory Union
Braintree	Orange Southwest Unified School District	Orange Southwest Supervisory Union
Brandon	Otter Valley Unified Union School District	Rutland Northeast Supervisory Union
Brattleboro	Windham Southeast School District	Windham Southeast Supervisory Union
Bridgewater	Windsor Central Modified Union School District	Windsor Central Supervisory Union
Brighton	Brighton School District	North Country Supervisory Union
Brighton	North Country Senior Union High School District	North Country Supervisory Union
Bridport	Addison Central Unified School District	Addison Central Supervisory Union
Bristol	Mount Abraham Unified School District	Mount Abraham Unified School District (Supervisory)
Brookfield	Orange Southwest Unified School District	Orange Southwest Supervisory Union
Brookline	West River Modified Union School District 72A	Windham Central Supervisory Union
Brookline	West River Modified Union School District 72B	Windham Central Supervisory Union
Brownington	Lake Region Union Elementary-Middle School District	Orleans Central Supervisory Union
Brownington	Lake Region Union High School District	Orleans Central Supervisory Union
Brunswick	Northeast Kingdom Choice School District	Essex North Supervisory Union
Buels Gore	Buels Gore School District	Chittenden East Supervisory Union
Burke	Kingdom East Unified Union School District	Kingdom East Supervisory Union
Burlington	Burlington School District	Burlington Supervisory District
Cabot	Cabot School District	Caledonia Central Supervisory Union
Calais	Washington Central Unified Union School District	Washington Central Supervisory Union
Cambridge	Cambridge School District	Lamoille North Supervisory Union
Cambridge	Lamoille North Modified Union School District 58B	Lamoille North Supervisory Union
Canaan	Canaan School District	Essex North Supervisory Union
Castleton	Slate Valley Unified Union School District	Addison Rutland Supervisory Union
Cavendish	Green Mountain Unified School District	Two Rivers Supervisory Union
Charleston	Charleston School District	North Country Supervisory Union
Charleston	North Country Senior Union High School District	North Country Supervisory Union
Charlotte	Champlain Valley Union School District	Champlain Valley Supervisory Union
Chelsea	First Branch Unified School District	White River Valley Supervisory Union
Chester	Green Mountain Unified School District	Two Rivers Supervisory Union
Chittenden	Barstow Unified Union School District	Rutland Northeast Supervisory Union
Clarendon	Mill River Unified Union School District	Mill River Supervisory Union
Colchester	Colchester School District	Colchester Supervisory District
Concord	Kingdom East Unified Union School District	Kingdom East Supervisory Union
Corinth	Waits River Valley Unified School District	Orange East Supervisory Union
Cornwall	Addison Central Unified School District	Addison Central Supervisory Union
Coventry	Coventry School District	North Country Supervisory Union
Craftsbury	Craftsbury School District	Orleans Southwest Supervisory Union
Danby	Taconic and Green Regional School District	Bennington Rutland Supervisory Union
Danville	Danville School District	Caledonia Central Supervisory Union
Derby	Derby School District	North Country Supervisory Union
Derby	North Country Junior Union High School District	North Country Supervisory Union
Derby	North Country Senior Union High School District	North Country Supervisory Union
Dorset	Taconic and Green Regional School District	Bennington Rutland Supervisory Union
Dover	River Valleys Unified School District	Windham Central Supervisory Union
Dummerston	Windham Southeast School District	Windham Southeast Supervisory Union
Duxbury	Harwood Union School District	Harwood Supervisory District
East Haven	Northeast Kingdom Choice School District	Essex North Supervisory Union
Montpelier	Washington Central Unified Union School District	Washington Central Supervisory Union
Eden	Lamoille North Modified Union School District 58A	Lamoille North Supervisory Union
Eden	Lamoille North Modified Union School District 58B	Lamoille North Supervisory Union
Elmore	Lamoille South Unified Union School District	Lamoille South Supervisory Union
Enosburgh	Enosburgh-Richford Unified Union School District	Franklin Northeast Supervisory Union
Essex	Essex Westford Unified Union School District	Essex Westford Supervisory Union
Fair Haven	Slate Valley Unified Union School District	Addison Rutland Supervisory Union
Fairfax	Fairfax School District	Franklin West Supervisory Union
Fairfield	Maple Run Unified School District	Maple Run Supervisory Union
Fairlee	Rivendell Interstate School District	Rivendell Supervisory Union
Fayston	Harwood Union School District	Harwood Supervisory District
Ferdinand	Ferdinand School District	Essex North Supervisory Union
Ferrisburgh	Addison Northwest Unified School District	Addison Northwest Supervisory Union
Fletcher	Fletcher School District	Lamoille North Supervisory Union
Franklin	Missisquoi Valley School District	Franklin Northwest Supervisory Union
Georgia	Georgia School District	Franklin West Supervisory Union
Glastenbury	Glastenbury School District	Southwest Vermont Supervisory Union
Glover	Lake Region Union Elementary-Middle School District	Orleans Central Supervisory Union
Glover	Lake Region Union High School District	Orleans Central Supervisory Union
Goshen	Otter Valley Unified Union School District	Rutland Northeast Supervisory Union
Grafton	Bellows Falls Union High School District	Windham Northeast Supervisory Union
Grafton	Windham Northeast Union Elementary School District	Windham Northeast Supervisory Union
Granby	Northeast Kingdom Choice School District	Essex North Supervisory Union
Grand Isle	Champlain Islands Unified Union School District	Grand Isle Supervisory Union
Granville	Granville-Hancock Unified District	White River Valley Supervisory Union
Greensboro	Hazen Union High School District	Orleans Southwest Supervisory Union
Greensboro	Orleans Southwest Union Elementary School District	Orleans Southwest Supervisory Union
Groton	Blue Mountain Union School District	Orange East Supervisory Union
Guildhall	Northeast Kingdom Choice School District	Essex North Supervisory Union
Guilford	Windham Southeast School District	Windham Southeast Supervisory Union
Halifax	Halifax School District	Windham Southwest Supervisory Union
Hancock	Granville-Hancock Unified District	White River Valley Supervisory Union
Hardwick	Hazen Union High School District	Orleans Southwest Supervisory Union
Hardwick	Orleans Southwest Union Elementary School District	Orleans Southwest Supervisory Union
Hartford, Vermont	Hartford School District	Hartford Supervisory District
Hartland	Hartland School District	Windsor Southeast Supervisory Union
Highgate	Missisquoi Valley School District	Franklin Northwest Supervisory Union
Hinesburg	Champlain Valley Union School District	Champlain Valley Supervisory Union
Holland	Holland School District	North Country Supervisory Union
Holland	North Country Junior Union High School District	North Country Supervisory Union
Holland	North Country Senior Union High School District	North Country Supervisory Union
Hubbardton	Slate Valley Unified Union School District	Addison Rutland Supervisory Union
Huntington	Huntington School District	Chittenden East Supervisory Union
Huntington	Mount Mansfield Modified Union School District B	Chittenden East Supervisory Union
Hyde Park	Lamoille North Modified Union School District 58A	Lamoille North Supervisory Union
Hyde Park	Lamoille North Modified Union School District 58B	Lamoille North Supervisory Union
Ira	Ira School District	Greater Rutland County Supervisory Union
Irasburg	Lake Region Union Elementary-Middle School District	Orleans Central Supervisory Union
Irasburg	Lake Region Union High School District	Orleans Central Supervisory Union
Isle La Motte	Champlain Islands Unified Union School District	Grand Isle Supervisory Union
Jamaica	West River Modified Union School District 72A	Windham Central Supervisory Union
Jamaica	West River Modified Union School District 72B	Windham Central Supervisory Union
Jay	Jay School District	North Country Supervisory Union
Jay	North Country Junior Union High School District	North Country Supervisory Union
Jay	North Country Senior Union High School District	North Country Supervisory Union
Jericho	Mount Mansfield Modified Union School District A	Chittenden East Supervisory Union
Jericho	Mount Mansfield Modified Union School District B	Chittenden East Supervisory Union
Johnson	Lamoille North Modified Union School District 58A	Lamoille North Supervisory Union
Johnson	Lamoille North Modified Union School District 58B	Lamoille North Supervisory Union
Killington	Windsor Central Modified Union School District	Windsor Central Supervisory Union
Kirby	Northeast Kingdom Choice School District	Essex North Supervisory Union
Landgrove	Taconic and Green Regional School District	Bennington Rutland Supervisory Union
Lemington	Northeast Kingdom Choice School District	Essex North Supervisory Union
Lewis	Lewis School District	Essex North Supervisory Union
Leicester	Otter Valley Unified Union School District	Rutland Northeast Supervisory Union
Lincoln	Lincoln School District	Lincoln School District (Supervisory)
Londonderry	Taconic and Green Regional School District	Bennington Rutland Supervisory Union
Lowell	Lowell School District	North Country Supervisory Union
Lowell	North Country Senior Union High School District	North Country Supervisory Union
Ludlow	Ludlow-Mount Holly Union School District	Two Rivers Supervisory Union
Lunenburg	Kingdom East Unified Union School District	Kingdom East Supervisory Union
Lyndon	Kingdom East Unified Union School District	Kingdom East Supervisory Union
Maidstone	Northeast Kingdom Choice School District	Essex North Supervisory Union
Manchester	Taconic and Green Regional School District	Bennington Rutland Supervisory Union
Marlboro	Marlboro School District	Windham Central Supervisory Union
Marshfield	Twinfield Union School District	Caledonia Central Supervisory Union
Mendon	Barstow Unified Union School District	Rutland Northeast Supervisory Union
Middlebury	Addison Central Unified School District	Addison Central Supervisory Union
Middlesex	Washington Central Unified Union School District	Washington Central Supervisory Union
Middletown Springs	Wells Spring Unified Union School District	Greater Rutland County Supervisory Union
Milton	Milton School District	Milton Supervisory District
Monkton	Mount Abraham Unified School District	Mount Abraham Unified School District (Supervisory)
Montgomery	Northern Mountain Valley Unified Union School District	Franklin Northeast Supervisory Union
Montpelier	Montpelier-Roxbury Unified School District	Montpelier-Roxbury Supervisory Union
Moretown	Harwood Union School District	Harwood Supervisory District
Morgan	Morgan School District	North Country Supervisory Union
Morgan	North Country Junior Union High School District	North Country Supervisory Union
Morgan	North Country Senior Union High School District	North Country Supervisory Union
Morristown	Lamoille South Unified Union School District	Lamoille South Supervisory Union
Mount Holly	Ludlow-Mount Holly Union School District	Two Rivers Supervisory Union
Mount Tabor	Taconic and Green Regional School District	Bennington Rutland Supervisory Union
New Haven	Mount Abraham Unified School District	Mount Abraham Unified School District (Supervisory)
Newark	Kingdom East Unified Union School District	Kingdom East Supervisory Union
Newbury	Oxbow Unified Union School District	Orange East Supervisory Union
Newfane	West River Modified Union School District 72A	Windham Central Supervisory Union
Newfane	West River Modified Union School District 72B	Windham Central Supervisory Union
Newport (city)	Newport City School District	North Country Supervisory Union
Newport (city)	North Country Junior Union High School District	North Country Supervisory Union
Newport (city)	North Country Senior Union High School District	North Country Supervisory Union
Newport (town)	Newport Town School District	North Country Supervisory Union
Newport (town)	North Country Senior Union High School District	North Country Supervisory Union
North Bennington	North Bennington Incorporated District	Southwest Vermont Supervisory Union
North Hero	Champlain Islands Unified Union School District	Grand Isle Supervisory Union
Northfield	Paine Mountain School District	Central Vermont Supervisory Union
Norton	Northeast Kingdom Choice School District	Essex North Supervisory Union
Norwich	Dresden Interstate Union High School District	Norwich Supervisory District
Norwich	Norwich School District	Norwich Supervisory District
Orange	Echo Valley Community School District	Central Vermont Supervisory Union
Orwell	Slate Valley Unified Union School District	Addison Rutland Supervisory Union
Panton	Addison Northwest Unified School District	Addison Northwest Supervisory Union
Pawlet	Metawee School District	Bennington Rutland Supervisory Union
Peacham	Peacham School District	Caledonia Central Supervisory Union
Peru	Taconic and Green Regional School District	Bennington Rutland Supervisory Union
Pittsfield	Pittsfield School District	Windsor Central Supervisory Union
Pittsford	Otter Valley Unified Union School District	Rutland Northeast Supervisory Union
Plainfield	Twinfield Union School District	Caledonia Central Supervisory Union
Plymouth	Windsor Central Modified Union School District	Windsor Central Supervisory Union
Pomfret	Windsor Central Modified Union School District	Windsor Central Supervisory Union
Poultney	Quarry Valley Unified Union School District	Greater Rutland County Supervisory Union
Pownal	Mount Anthony Union High School District	Southwest Vermont Supervisory Union
Pownal	Southwest Vermont Union Elementary School District	Southwest Vermont Supervisory Union
Proctor	Quarry Valley Unified Union School District	Greater Rutland County Supervisory Union
Putney	Windham Southeast School District	Windham Southeast Supervisory Union
Randolph	Orange Southwest Unified School District	Orange Southwest Supervisory Union
Reading	Windsor Central Modified Union School District	Windsor Central Supervisory Union
Readsboro	Readsboro School District	Windham Southwest Supervisory Union
Richford	Enosburgh-Richford Unified Union School District	Franklin Northeast Supervisory Union
Richmond	Mount Mansfield Modified Union School District A	Chittenden East Supervisory Union
Richmond	Mount Mansfield Modified Union School District B	Chittenden East Supervisory Union
Ripton	Addison Central Unified School District	Addison Central Supervisory Union
Rockingham	Bellows Falls Union High School District	Windham Northeast Supervisory Union
Rockingham	Rockingham School District	Windham Northeast Supervisory Union
Rochester	Rochester-Stockbridge Unified School District	White River Valley Supervisory Union
Roxbury	Montpelier-Roxbury Unified School District	Montpelier-Roxbury Supervisory Union
Royalton	White River Unified District	White River Valley Supervisory Union
Rupert	Metawee School District	Bennington Rutland Supervisory Union
Rutland (city)	Rutland City School District	Rutland City Supervisory District
Rutland (town)	Rutland Town School District	Greater Rutland County Supervisory Union
Ryegate	Blue Mountain Union School District	Orange East Supervisory Union
Salisbury	Addison Central Unified School District	Addison Central Supervisory Union
Sandgate	Sandgate School District	Southwest Vermont Supervisory Union
Searsburg	Searsburg School District	Windham Southwest Supervisory Union
Shaftsbury	Mount Anthony Union High School District	Southwest Vermont Supervisory Union
Shaftsbury	Southwest Vermont Union Elementary School District	Southwest Vermont Supervisory Union
Sharon	Sharon School District	White River Valley Supervisory Union
Sheffield	Kingdom East Unified Union School District	Kingdom East Supervisory Union
Shelburne	Champlain Valley Union School District	Champlain Valley Supervisory Union
Sheldon	Northern Mountain Valley Unified Union School District	Franklin Northeast Supervisory Union
Shoreham	Addison Central Unified School District	Addison Central Supervisory Union
Shrewsbury	Mill River Unified Union School District	Mill River Supervisory Union
Somerset	Somerset School District	Windham Southwest Supervisory Union
South Burlington	South Burlington School District	South Burlington Supervisory District
South Hero	South Hero School District	Grand Isle Supervisory Union
Springfield	Springfield School District	Springfield Supervisory District
St. Albans (city)	Maple Run Unified School District	Maple Run Supervisory Union
St. Albans (town)	Maple Run Unified School District	Maple Run Supervisory Union
St. George	Champlain Valley Union School District	Champlain Valley Supervisory Union
St. Johnsbury	St. Johnsbury School District	St. Johnsbury Supervisory District
Stamford	Stamford School District	Windham Southwest Supervisory Union
Stannard	Orleans Southwest Union Elementary School District	Orleans Southwest Supervisory Union
Stannard	Stannard School District	Orleans Southwest Supervisory Union
Starksboro	Mount Abraham Unified School District	Mount Abraham Unified School District (Supervisory)
Stockbridge	Rochester-Stockbridge Unified School District	White River Valley Supervisory Union
Stowe	Lamoille South Unified Union School District	Lamoille South Supervisory Union
Strafford	Strafford School District	White River Valley Supervisory Union
Stratton	Stratton School District	Windham Central Supervisory Union
Sudbury	Otter Valley Unified Union School District	Rutland Northeast Supervisory Union
Sunderland	Taconic and Green Regional School District	Bennington Rutland Supervisory Union
Sutton	Kingdom East Unified Union School District	Kingdom East Supervisory Union
Swanton	Missisquoi Valley School District	Franklin Northwest Supervisory Union
Thetford	Thetford School District	Orange East Supervisory Union
Tinmouth	Mill River Unified Union School District	Mill River Supervisory Union
Topsham	Waits River Valley Unified School District	Orange East Supervisory Union
Troy	North Country Senior Union High School District	North Country Supervisory Union
Troy	Troy School District	North Country Supervisory Union
Townshend	West River Modified Union School District 72A	Windham Central Supervisory Union
Townshend	West River Modified Union School District 72B	Windham Central Supervisory Union
Tunbridge	First Branch Unified School District	White River Valley Supervisory Union
Underhill	Mount Mansfield Modified Union School District A	Chittenden East Supervisory Union
Underhill	Mount Mansfield Modified Union School District B	Chittenden East Supervisory Union
Vergennes	Addison Northwest Unified School District	Addison Northwest Supervisory Union
Vernon	Vernon School District	Windham Southeast Supervisory Union
Vernon	Windham Southeast School District	Windham Southeast Supervisory Union
Vershire	Rivendell Interstate School District	Rivendell Supervisory Union
Victory	Northeast Kingdom Choice School District	Essex North Supervisory Union
Waitsfield	Harwood Union School District	Harwood Supervisory District
Walden	Caledonia Cooperative School District	Caledonia Central Supervisory Union
Wallingford	Mill River Unified Union School District	Mill River Supervisory Union
Waltham	Addison Northwest Unified School District	Addison Northwest Supervisory Union
Wardsboro	River Valleys Unified School District	Windham Central Supervisory Union
Warner's Grant	Warners Grant School District	Essex North Supervisory Union
Warren	Harwood Union School District	Harwood Supervisory District
Warren's Gore	Warren Gore School District	Essex North Supervisory Union
Washington	Echo Valley Community School District	Central Vermont Supervisory Union
Waterbury	Harwood Union School District	Harwood Supervisory District
Waterford	Caledonia Cooperative School District	Caledonia Central Supervisory Union
Waterville	Lamoille North Modified Union School District 58A	Lamoille North Supervisory Union
Waterville	Lamoille North Modified Union School District 58B	Lamoille North Supervisory Union
Wells	Wells Spring Unified Union School District	Greater Rutland County Supervisory Union
Wells River	Blue Mountain Union School District	Orange East Supervisory Union
Weathersfield	Weathersfield School District	Windsor Southeast Supervisory Union
West Fairlee	Rivendell Interstate School District	Rivendell Supervisory Union
West Haven	Slate Valley Unified Union School District	Addison Rutland Supervisory Union
West Rutland	Quarry Valley Unified Union School District	Greater Rutland County Supervisory Union
West Windsor	Mount Ascutney School District	Windsor Southeast Supervisory Union
Westfield	North Country Senior Union High School District	North Country Supervisory Union
Westfield	Westfield School District	North Country Supervisory Union
Westford	Essex Westford Unified Union School District	Essex Westford Supervisory Union
Westminster	Bellows Falls Union High School District	Windham Northeast Supervisory Union
Westminster	Windham Northeast Union Elementary School District	Windham Northeast Supervisory Union
Westmore	Lake Region Union Elementary-Middle School District	Orleans Central Supervisory Union
Westmore	Lake Region Union High School District	Orleans Central Supervisory Union
Weston	Taconic and Green Regional School District	Bennington Rutland Supervisory Union
Weybridge	Addison Central Unified School District	Addison Central Supervisory Union
Wheelock	Kingdom East Unified Union School District	Kingdom East Supervisory Union
Whiting	Otter Valley Unified Union School District	Rutland Northeast Supervisory Union
Whitingham	Twin Valley Unified School District	Windham Southwest Supervisory Union
Williamstown	Paine Mountain School District	Central Vermont Supervisory Union
Williston	Champlain Valley Union School District	Champlain Valley Supervisory Union
Wilmington	Twin Valley Unified School District	Windham Southwest Supervisory Union
Windham	Windham School District	Windham Central Supervisory Union
Windsor	Mount Ascutney School District	Windsor Southeast Supervisory Union
Winhall	Winhall School District	Bennington Rutland Supervisory Union
Winooski	Winooski School District	Winooski Supervisory District
Wolcott	Wolcott School District	Orleans Southwest Supervisory Union
Woodbury	Hazen Union High School District	Orleans Southwest Supervisory Union
Woodbury	Orleans Southwest Union Elementary School District	Orleans Southwest Supervisory Union
Woodford	Mount Anthony Union High School District	Southwest Vermont Supervisory Union
Woodford	Southwest Vermont Union Elementary School District	Southwest Vermont Supervisory Union
Woodstock	Windsor Central Modified Union School District	Windsor Central Supervisory Union
Worcester	Washington Central Unified Union School District	Washington Central Supervisory Union
