= Duxbury, Vermont =

Town in Vermont, United States

- Town
- Location in Washington County and the state of Vermont
- Coordinates: 44°18′46″N 72°46′26″W
- Country: United States
- State: Vermont
- County: Washington
- Communities: Duxbury; South Duxbury; Dowsville

Area
  - Total: 43.1 sq mi (111.6 km^{2})
  - Land: 42.9 sq mi (111.2 km^{2})
  - Water: 0.15 sq mi (0.4 km^{2})
- Elevation: 2,251 ft (686 m)

Population (2020)
  - Total: 1,413
  - Density: 32.91/sq mi (12.71/km^{2})
- Time zone: UTC-5 (Eastern (EST))
  - Summer (DST): UTC-4 (EDT)
- ZIP Codes: 05676 (Waterbury); 05660 (Moretown)
- Area code: 802
- FIPS code: 50-18550
- GNIS feature ID: 1462085
- Website: www.duxburyvermont.org

Duxbury (/ˈdʌksbʌri/) is a town in Washington County, Vermont, United States. The population was 1,413 at the 2020 census.

== History ==
In 1880, Emeline Meaker of Duxbury was hanged for poisoning her niece, Alice. The trial received much coverage throughout the country. She was the first woman hanged in Vermont.

Duxbury claimed to be the only municipality in the United States that had an elected position of dogcatcher. However, in 2018, it was determined that holding an election to determine a town's dogcatcher violates Vermont state law, as dogcatcher is expressly an appointed position.

== Geography ==
According to the United States Census Bureau, the town has a total area of 43.1 square miles (111.6 km^{2}), of which 42.9 square miles (111.2 km^{2}) is land and 0.2 square mile (0.4 km^{2}) (0.37%) is water.

== Demographics ==
Historical population
Census	Pop.	Note	%±
1790	39		—
1800	153		292.3%
1810	326		113.1%
1820	440		35.0%
1830	652		48.2%
1840	820		25.8%
1850	895		9.1%
1860	1,000		11.7%
1870	893		−10.7%
1880	894		0.1%
1890	912		2.0%
1900	778		−14.7%
1910	648		−16.7%
1920	631		−2.6%
1930	553		−12.4%
1940	854		54.4%
1950	489		−42.7%
1960	546		11.7%
1970	621		13.7%
1980	877		41.2%
1990	976		11.3%
2000	1,289		32.1%
2010	1,337		3.7%
2020	1,413		5.7%
U.S. Decennial Census

As of the census of 2000, there were 1,289 people, 498 households, and 338 families residing in the town. The population density was 30.0 people per square mile (11.6/km^{2}). There were 569 housing units at an average density of 13.3 per square mile (5.1/km^{2}). The racial makeup of the town was 98.06% White, 0.16% African American, 0.16% Native American, 0.54% Asian, 0.23% from other races, and 0.85% from two or more races. Hispanic or Latino of any race were 0.54% of the population.

There were 498 households, out of which 32.9% had children under the age of 18 living with them, 59.2% were couples joined in either marriage or civil union, 4.8% had a female householder with no husband present, and 32.1% were non-families. 21.9% of all households were made up of individuals, and 6.2% had someone living alone who was 65 years of age or older. The average household size was 2.52 and the average family size was 2.98.

In the town, the population was spread out, with 24.2% under the age of 18, 5.1% from 18 to 24, 34.8% from 25 to 44, 26.8% from 45 to 64, and 9.1% who were 65 years of age or older. The median age was 38 years. For every 100 females, there were 109.6 males. For every 100 females age 18 and over, there were 99.8 males.

The median income for a household in the town was $47,981, and the median income for a family was $57,574. Males had a median income of $34,125 versus $27,031 for females. The per capita income for the town was $20,707. About 0.9% of families and 5.0% of the population were below the poverty line, including 1.3% of those under age 18 and 10.2% of those age 65 or over.

== Education ==
It is in the Harwood Unified School District.

Previously it was in the Duxbury/Waterbury Union School District 45.
