= North Country Supervisory Union =

Coordinates: 44.945196°N 72.205453°W

Location
- Newport, Vermont

District information
- Type: Public

The North Country Supervisory Union is a school district responsible for the education of students in the Vermont towns of the city of Newport, Newport Town, Derby, Charleston, Jay, Troy, North Troy, Coventry, Brighton, Holland, Morgan, Westfield, and Lowell. It is administered by a school board.

The supervisory union changed its name from the "Orleans-Essex North Supervisory Union" in 2008.

By land area of the towns which send students there, North Country is the largest supervisory union in Vermont at 520 square miles.

Its charter requires maintaining one elementary school in each of the towns mentioned, as well as the North Country Junior High School in Derby, and the North Country Union High School, in Newport City. The junior high school is supported by the city, and the towns of Derby, Holland, Jay, and Morgan. The union is headquartered in the city of Newport.

The high school's budget for 2009-2010 was $13,863,537. The supervisory union had the lowest equalized per-student cost among the 28 union school districts in the state - $9,061.

== Staff ==
Elaine Collins is the superintendent of North Country Supervisory Union. Previous superintendents were John Castle (2014-2022), and Robert Kern (2011-2014).

== Statistics ==
In 2007, there were 9.9 pupils per teacher in the district. Enrollment was 3,123. 46.3% of the students were economically disadvantaged. The pupils were 96.4% white, consistent with Vermont and the area's similarly high percentage.

In 2010, the highest tax rate in any town was in Newport City at $1.414, and the lowest was in Lowell at $.907. The tax rates in Vermont are "equalized" under the provisions of Act 60.
