= Steve Clifford =

American basketball coach (born 1961)

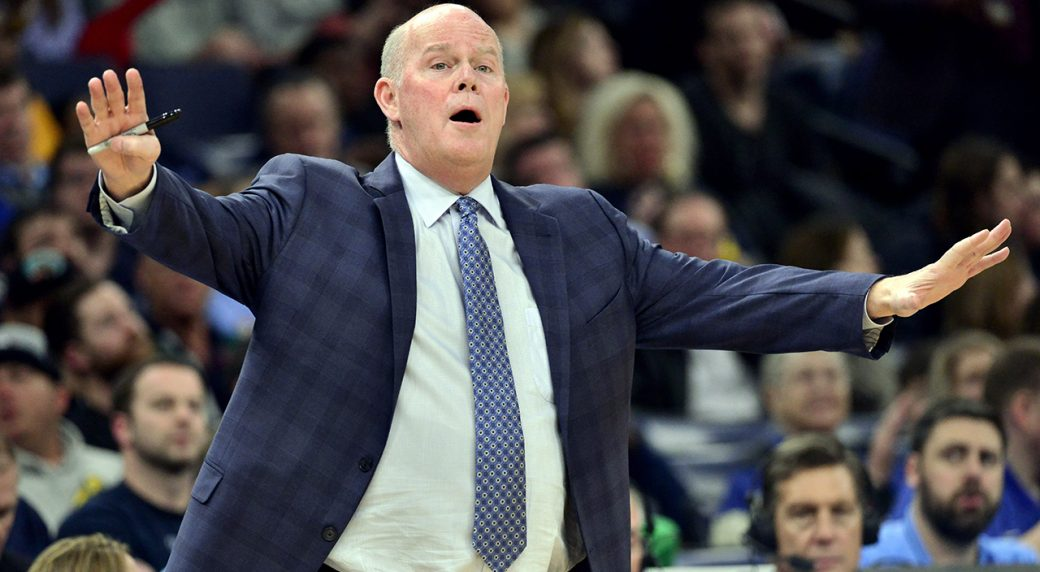
- Clifford in 2020

Washington Wizards
- Position: Coaching advisor
- League: NBA

Personal information
- Born: September 17, 1961 (age 65) Island Falls, Maine, U.S.

Career information
- High school: North Country Union (Newport, Vermont)
- College: Maine–Farmington (1979–1983)
- Coaching career: 1983–2024

Career history

Coaching
- 1983–1985: Woodland HS
- 1985–1989: Saint Anselm (assistant)
- 1989–1990: Fairfield (assistant)
- 1990–1994: Boston University (assistant)
- 1994–1995: Siena (assistant)
- 1995–1999: Adelphi
- 1999–2000: East Carolina (assistant)
- 2001–2003: New York Knicks (assistant)
- 2003–2007: Houston Rockets (assistant)
- 2007–2012: Orlando Magic (assistant)
- 2012–2013: Los Angeles Lakers (assistant)
- 2013–2018: Charlotte Bobcats/Hornets
- 2018–2021: Orlando Magic
- 2022-2024: Charlotte Hornets
- 2025–2026: Phoenix Suns (assistant)
- 2026–present: Washington Wizards (assistant)

Career highlights
- As head coach: 2× East Coast Conference tournament champion (1996, 1999); As assistant coach: America East tournament champion (1990)

Steven Gerald Clifford (born September 17, 1961) is an American professional basketball coach and executive who serves as a coaching advisor for the Washington Wizards of the National Basketball Association (NBA). He has previously served as the head coach of the Charlotte Hornets and Orlando Magic.

== Early life ==
Born in Island Falls, Maine, Clifford grew up in Mattawamkeag, Maine, until the third grade, when he moved to Vermont. He played varsity basketball under Gerald Clifford, his father and head coach at North Country Union High School in Newport, Vermont.

Clifford attended the University of Maine at Farmington, where he played college basketball for four years. In his final two seasons, he was team captain and was named Best Defensive Player. He graduated with a degree in special education.

== Coaching career ==
After graduating from college, Clifford became a teacher at Woodland High School in Maine. He also gained his first coaching experience at the school, serving as their head coach for two seasons while leading them to two tournaments. He then served as an assistant coach at St. Anselm College, Fairfield University, Boston University and Siena College. In 1995, he assumed the head coaching duties at Adelphi University and coached for four seasons leading his team to four appearances in the NCAA Division II Tournament, an 86–36 (.705) record and four consecutive 20-win seasons. He was the first coach in the school's history with back-to-back 20-plus-win seasons.

Clifford became an NBA assistant coach with the New York Knicks and Houston Rockets under Jeff Van Gundy and quickly developed a reputation as a defensive expert. He then was an assistant for Stan Van Gundy with the Orlando Magic. He considers both the Van Gundy brothers as mentors. He reached the NBA playoffs in each of his five seasons with Orlando, appearing in the NBA Finals in 2009.

Clifford then joined the Los Angeles Lakers in 2012–13 as an assistant.

=== Charlotte Bobcats/Hornets ===
On May 29, 2013, Clifford was hired by the Charlotte Bobcats to be their head coach.

Clifford implemented a defensive mentality in Charlotte during his first year as head coach turning the Charlotte Bobcats into a top five defensive team when in the years prior to his tenure they ranked near the bottom of the NBA in that category. He led the Bobcats to the 2014 NBA playoffs in his first year as head coach, during which he coached the Bobcats to a 43–39 record. The two years prior to him joining the Bobcats only had a combined total of 28 wins. He was named Eastern Conference Coach of the Month for April 2014 after he led the Bobcats to a 7–1 record leading to the playoffs. He finished fourth in Coach of the Year voting in his first year. On December 6, 2017, it was announced that Clifford would not coach indefinitely to deal with his health issue. On January 11, 2018, the Hornets announced that Clifford was medically cleared to return to coaching after a 21-game absence after dealing with sleep deprivation. After the 2017–18 regular season, he was fired as head coach on April 13, 2018, after five seasons coaching the team to a 196–214 record total.

=== Orlando Magic ===
On May 30, 2018, Clifford was named the head coach of the Orlando Magic.

The Magic started the 2018–19 season by splitting their first 24 games before falling 11 games under .500 after a 126–117 loss to the Oklahoma City Thunder. Despite the dismal start, Clifford led the Magic on a dramatic turnaround. On April 7, 2019, Orlando defeated the Boston Celtics 116–108 to clinch their first playoff berth since the 2011–12 season. The win also clinched the Magic's first Southeast Division title since the 2009–10 season. This was the Magic's first playoff appearance since trading Dwight Howard to the Los Angeles Lakers in 2012, ending the longest playoff drought in franchise history.

On June 5, 2021, Clifford and the Magic decided to part ways.

=== Charlotte Hornets (second stint) ===
After the 2021–22 NBA season concluded, the Hornets re-hired Clifford as their head coach on June 24, 2022.

On April 3, 2024, the Hornets announced that Clifford would step down as head coach at the end of the 2023–24 season and move into a front-office advisory role.

=== Phoenix Suns ===
On August 13, 2025, the Phoenix Suns hired Clifford to serve as a coaching advisor under head coach Jordan Ott.

=== Washington Wizards ===
On July 6, 2026, the Washington Wizards hired Clifford to serve as an advisor under head coach Brian Keefe.

== Head coaching record ==
=== College ===
Record table
Season	Team	Overall	Conference	Standing	Postseason
Adelphi Panthers (New York Collegiate Athletic Conference) (1995–1999)
1995–96	Adelphi	23–7	17–5	2nd	NCAA D-II first round
1996–97	Adelphi	21–9	17–5	3rd	NCAA D-II first round
1997–98	Adelphi	22–8	18–4	3rd	NCAA D-II first round
1998–99	Adelphi	20–12	14–8	3rd	NCAA D-II Sweet 16
Adelphi University:		86–36 (.705)	66–22		
Total:		86–36 (.705)			
National champion Postseason invitational champion Conference regular season champion Conference regular season and conference tournament champion Division regular season champion Division regular season and conference tournament champion Conference tournament champion

=== NBA ===
Legend
Regular season	G	Games coached	W	Games won	L	Games lost	W–L %	Win–loss %
Playoffs	PG	Playoff games	PW	Playoff wins	PL	Playoff losses	PW–L %	Playoff win–loss %

Team	Year	G	W	L	W–L%	Finish	PG	PW	PL	PW–L%	Result
Charlotte	2013–14	82	43	39	.524	3rd in Southeast	4	0	4	.000	Lost in first round
Charlotte	2014–15	82	33	49	.402	4th in Southeast	—	—	—	—	Missed playoffs
Charlotte	2015–16	82	48	34	.585	3rd in Southeast	7	3	4	.429	Lost in first round
Charlotte	2016–17	82	36	46	.439	4th in Southeast	—	—	—	—	Missed playoffs
Charlotte	2017–18	82	36	46	.439	3rd in Southeast	—	—	—	—	Missed playoffs
Orlando	2018–19	82	42	40	.512	1st in Southeast	5	1	4	.200	Lost in first round
Orlando	2019–20	73	33	40	.452	2nd in Southeast	5	1	4	.200	Lost in first round
Orlando	2020–21	72	21	51	.292	5th in Southeast	—	—	—	—	Missed playoffs
Charlotte	2022–23	82	27	55	.329	5th in Southeast	—	—	—	—	Missed playoffs
Charlotte	2023–24	82	21	61	.256	4th in Southeast	—	—	—	—	Missed playoffs
Career		801	340	461	.424		21	5	16	.238	
