= North Country Union High School =

Coordinates: 44.9465465°N 72.2033581°W

Location
- 209 Veterans Avenue; Newport, Vermont 05855

Information
- Type: Secondary school
- Principal: Christopher Young
- Grades: 9-12
- Enrollment: 692 (2023-2024)
- Colors: Maroon and blue
- Mascot: Falcon
- Affiliation: Public
- Website: http://ncuhs.ncsuvt.org

North Country Union High School (NCUHS, North Country, or NCU) is a secondary school located in Newport, Vermont, United States. It is operated by the North Country Supervisory Union school district.

The school serves students from Newport City, Newport Town, Derby, Charleston, Jay, Troy, North Troy, Coventry, Brighton, Holland, Morgan, Westfield and Lowell. Enrollment ranges between 1100 and 1200 students.

NCU is affiliated with the North Country Career Center, a regional technical center that shares the NCU building.

The school colors are maroon and blue, and its mascot is the Falcon.

== History ==
The school stands on what was once Veterans' Park. The local American Legion post donated the land to the school district. The park had been used for carnivals, horse races, and baseball games.

Until 2010, the school played hockey across the border in Stanstead, Quebec. It was the only professionally maintained rink in the area.

== Buildings ==
The North Country Career Center was completed in 2008. It cost $18.7 million, and was financed by bond.

== Activities ==
NCUHS has the following clubs: Computer Gaming Club, Drama, Distributive Education Clubs of America, Flag Corps, Future Business Leaders of America, Future Farmers of America, Junior Reserve Officers' Training Corps (JROTC), National Honor Society, Leadership Council, Rotary Interact, SkillsUSA, and Student Council.

=== Music ===
Dance:

- Dance Company
- Dance Team

Instrumental:

- NCUHS Music Ensemble Band
- North Country Jazz Ensemble

Vocal:

- Chorus
- Men's Ensemble
- Select Choir
- Women's Ensemble

== Athletics ==
=== Recognition ===
State championships have been won by the school in the following sports:

- Champions 2007, Metro Division, Girls' Golf
- Ice Hockey Division II 1990, 2001
- Football Division III 1995
- Football Division II 1992, 1996 and 1997, State Runner-Up 2004
- Boys' Division I soccer 1974, 1975, 1998 (national Top 25 ranking among high school boys' soccer teams)
- Field Hockey Division III 2014
- Girls' Ice Hockey Division II 2015
- Girls' Snowboard Team 2015
- Girls' Nordic Ski Team 2016 and 2017, led by team captain Aiden Briggs

=== Coach ===
The New England Soccer Hall of Fame inducted boys' varsity soccer coach Joe Batista. He has coached at the school for 27 years. He has a total of 161 varsity wins in the Metro Conference and Division One from coaching various teams. He has compiled a record of 108-61-22 from 1997 to 2007. His teams have won one State Championship and two Metro Conference titles. He has been honored as New England Coach of the Year once, twice as Vermont Coach of the Year, and three times as Metro Conference Coach of the Year.

=== Hockey ===
There are boys' and girls' hockey teams. The school announced that the team will play home games at the Jay Peak Resort starting in 2010.

== Budget ==
Per pupil expenditure for the high school in 2009 was $11,657, the 26th lowest out of 28 union high schools in the state, 226 out of 250 schools in the state, and less than any other area school.

== Events ==
Robert De Cormier did a workshop in 2007 with the school's select choir.

== Notable alumni ==
- Robert L. Caslen, United States Army lieutenant general who served as Superintendent of the United States Military Academy
- Steve Clifford, two time head coach of the Charlotte Hornets and Orlando Magic NBA basketball teams
- Samuel Douglass, member of the Vermont Senate
