= Harwood Unified Union School District =

School district in Vermont, United States

Harwood Unified Union School District #60 (HUUSD) is a school district headquartered in Waitsfield, Vermont.

The district includes the following towns: Duxbury, Fayston, Moretown, Waitsfield, Warren, and Waterbury. Census-designated places in this school district include Waitsfield, Waterbury and Waterbury Center.

== History ==
It was established in June 2017 as a merger of the Fayston, Harwood Union, Moretown, Waitsfield, Warren, and Waterbury-Duxbury school districts.

In 2025 the district held two meetings on whether to close some schools. For the moment the district leadership decided not to close schools.

In 2026 the district leadership began consideration on whether to shutter two elementary schools.

== Schools ==
Secondary schools

- Harwood Union Middle and High School
- Crossett Brook Middle School

Elementary schools

- Fayston Elementary School
- Moretown Elementary School
- Waitsfield Elementary School
- Warren Elementary School
- Brookside Primary School
