= Rivendell Interstate School District =

School district in New Hampshire, United States

Rivendell Interstate School District is a school district headquartered in Orford, New Hampshire. In addition to Orford, its attendance zone includes the following places in Vermont: Fairlee, Vershire, and West Fairlee.

== History ==
This district is a consolidation of four existing school districts. The residents of the area approved establishing this district in an election held on October 13, 1998. Rivendell Supervisory Union began administrative oversight of those four districts effective July 1, 1999, and the district itself began operations on the same calendar date in 2000. It was the first school district in the United States to officially include territory in multiple states. In 1999 there was a bond proposal to build new secondary and primary schools.

Keri Gelenian was principal of Rivendell Academy, the district's secondary school, from 2010 until February 2024.

== Schools ==
- Rivendell Academy (secondary school for grades 6-12) - Orford, NH
  - In 2024, the enrollment count was 240.
- Samuel Morey Elementary School - Fairlee, VT
- Westshire Elementary School - West Fairlee, VT

In 2023 the school district's board of trustees voted to close Morey Elementary School. Six members voted in favor, two were against, and two were not present.
