= Mount Mansfield Modified Union School District =

School district in Vermont, United States

Coordinates: 44.518°N 72.945°W

Address
- 211 Browns Trace Road Jericho, Vermont, 5465; United States

District information
- Type: Public
- Grades: PreK–12
- NCES District ID: 5000443

Students and staff
- Students: 2,569
- Teachers: 169.93
- Staff: 214.84
- Student–teacher ratio: 15.12

Other information
- Website: www.mmuusd.org

Mount Mansfield Unified Union School District (MMUUSD), formerly the Mount Mansfield Union School District #17, is a school district headquartered in Jericho, Vermont.

It is the district farthest east in Chittenden County, Vermont. There are approximately 2600 students enrolled in the district.

Each town in the district has its own elementary school, which serves K-4th grade.

Students from Huntington, Bolton and Richmond attend Camels Hump Middle School. Those from Jericho and Underhill attend Browns River Middle School. Both middle schools serve grades 5-8.

The district's high school is Mount Mansfield Union High School, located in Jericho, which takes students graduating from both middle schools, and serves grades 9-12.

== History ==
The predecessor districts were in the Chittenden East Supervisory Union (CESU), which was their umbrella organization. In a span of ten years the residents of the predecessor districts voted on whether to merge their school districts on five occasions. The vote that day favored consolidation. The district was established effective November 4, 2014. The merged district began operations the following year.

In 2011 there was a vote among the towns on whether to merge that did not pass. Another such vote was scheduled in 2014. The district formed with the voluntary merger of the Bolton, Jericho, Richmond, and Underhill school districts. When MMUUSD formed, Huntington residents already had representation as the community sent its secondary students there, but Huntington continued to have its own elementary school district.

Residents of Huntington resisted merging for a longer time, with four unsuccessful votes on merging into MMUUSD. At one point the state of Vermont passed Act 46 that obligated school districts to merge. The Huntington School District sued the state government to try to stop the merger. In 2018 the Huntington district filed its third lawsuit against mergers. On June 6, 2019, the vote to merge Huntington into Mount Mansfield succeeded on a 450-191 basis; the Chittenden East Supervisory Union dissolved as a result.

== Schools ==
High school

- Mount Mansfield Union High School

Middle schools

- Browns River Middle School
- Camels Hump Middle School

Elementary schools

- Brewster-Pierce Memorial School (Huntington) - In 2019 it had 136 students.
- Jericho Elementary School
- Richmond Elementary School
- Smilie Memorial School (Bolton)
- Underhill Central School

Preschool

- Underhill ID Preschool

Former schools

- Underhill I.D. Elementary School - In 2018 the board voted to close the school effective 2019, with eight members favoring and five opposing. Students were moved to Jericho Elementary School and Underhill Central School.
