= Holland, Vermont =

- Town
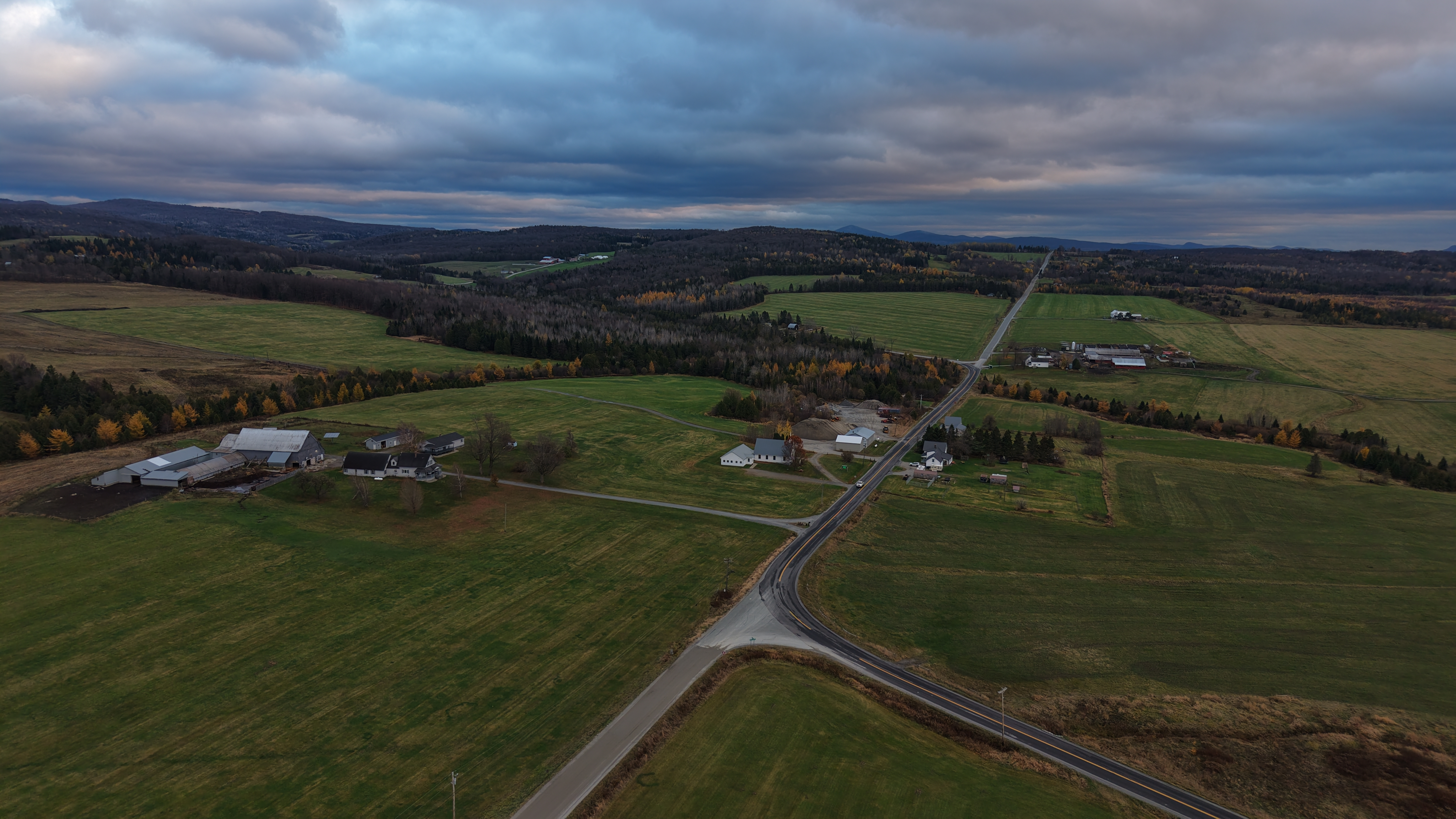
- Holland, VT, from the north

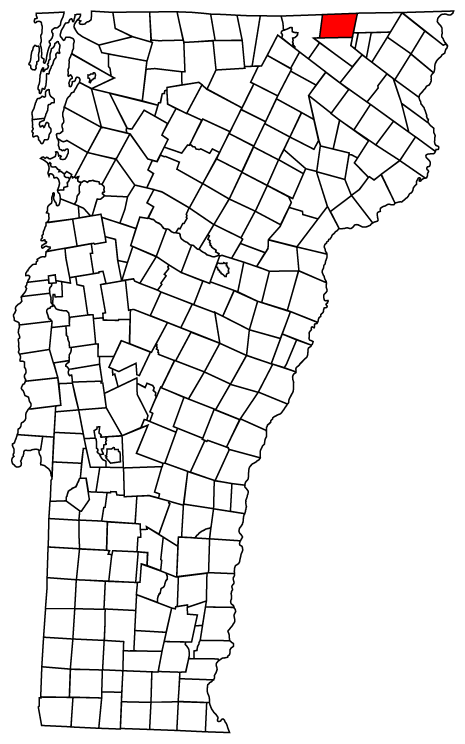
- Located in Orleans County, Vermont
- Coordinates: 44°59′12″N 72°00′36″W
- Country: United States
- State: Vermont
- County: Orleans
- Chartered: October 26, 1779

Area
  - Total: 38.2 sq mi (99.0 km^{2})
  - Land: 37.6 sq mi (97.4 km^{2})
  - Water: 0.62 sq mi (1.6 km^{2})
- Elevation: 1,755 ft (535 m)

Population (2020)
  - Total: 632
  - Density: 17/sq mi (6.5/km^{2})
- Time zone: UTC-5 (EST)
  - Summer (DST): UTC-4 (EDT)
- ZIP Codes: 05830 (Derby Line); 05829 (Derby)
- Area code: 802
- FIPS code: 50-33775
- GNIS feature ID: 1462277
- Website: hollandvt.gov

Holland is a town in Orleans County, Vermont, United States. The population was 632 at the 2020 census.

It derives its name from Holland.

== Geography ==
According to the United States Census Bureau, the town has a total area of 38.2 square miles (99 km^{2}), of which 37.6 square miles (97 km^{2}) is land and 0.6 square miles (1.6 km^{2}) (1.65%) is water.

Holland is the highest town in Orleans County. Perhaps due to its high altitude, Holland has historically had the coolest weather and highest rate of snowfall in Orleans County.

Holland contains three unincorporated villages:

- Holland Center
- Holland Pond
- Tice Hollow

== History ==
The original town was laid out in quarter sections, that is, each grantee had about 1/4 of a square mile, or 160 acres (0.65 km^{2}) each.

In 1810, there was a smallpox epidemic.

In 1973, a promoter staged a rock concert which 30,000, mostly young people, attended, overwhelming local resources.

== Demographics ==
Historical population
Census	Pop.	Note	%±
1810	128		—
1820	100		−21.9%
1830	422		322.0%
1840	605		43.4%
1850	669		10.6%
1860	748		11.8%
1870	881		17.8%
1880	913		3.6%
1890	878		−3.8%
1900	838		−4.6%
1910	722		−13.8%
1920	714		−1.1%
1930	580		−18.8%
1940	533		−8.1%
1950	406		−23.8%
1960	376		−7.4%
1970	383		1.9%
1980	473		23.5%
1990	423		−10.6%
2000	588		39.0%
2010	629		7.0%
2020	632		0.5%
U.S. Decennial Census

As of the census of 2000, there were 588 people, 219 households, and 160 families residing in the town. The population density was 15.6 people per square mile (6.0 people/km^{2}). There were 354 housing units at an average density of 9.4 per square mile (3.6/km^{2}). The racial makeup of the town was 96.94% White, 0.51% African American, 2.04% Native American, 0.17% Asian, 0.17% from other races, and 0.17% from two or more races. Hispanic or Latino of any race were 0.17% of the population.

There were 219 households, out of which 39.7% had children under the age of 18 living with them, 58.9% were couples living together and joined in either marriage or civil union, 9.6% had a female householder with no husband present, and 26.5% were non-families. 20.1% of all households were made up of individuals, and 7.3% had someone living alone who was 65 years of age or older. The average household size was 2.68 and the average family size was 3.03.

In the town, the population was spread out, with 32.1% under the age of 18, 5.6% from 18 to 24, 30.6% from 25 to 44, 22.6% from 45 to 64, and 9.0% who were 65 years of age or older. The median age was 35 years. For every 100 females, there were 94.7 males. For every 100 females age 18 and over, there were 97.5 males.

== Government ==
=== Town ===
- Town Clerk – Diane Judd
- Treasurer – Diane Judd
- Delinquent Tax Collector – Diane Judd
- Auditor – Gaetane Patenaude
- Agent – Diane Judd
- Lister – Brian Currier
- Road Commissioner (appointed) – Tommy Charest
- Planning Commissioners – Albert Hauver, Marc Farrow, Gary Champney Jr.
- Solid Waste Supervisor – Winston Dowland
- Grand Juror – Speedo Deskins
- Cemetery Commissioner – Michael Percy
- Constable – Clara Nadeau
- Moderator – Eernest Emmerson
- Budget – $475,467

==== Building code ====
The building code requires a roof snow load bearing capacity of 50 pounds per square foot (2.4 kPa).

=== School District ===
- Member, Union School Board – Lucy Cannon (2009) and Diane Rowlee (2010)Diana Emmerson
- Chair, School Board – Diana Limlaw
- Member, Board – Lori Ackerson (2009), Michael Lyon (2010), Diana Limlaw (2010)
- Principal – Linda Phalen
- Budget – $966,110

== Economy ==
=== Personal income ===
The median income for a household in the town was $28,359, and the median income for a family was $29,297. Males had a median income of $22,500 versus $16,528 for females. The per capita income for the town was $11,936. About 12.6% of families and 15.1% of the population were below the poverty line, including 12.8% of those under age 18 and 10.8% of those age 65 or over. Holland has the lowest per capita income of any place in Orleans County.

== Notable people ==
- Robert W. Castle, Episcopal priest, activist and actor (Philadelphia, Beloved, Rachel Getting Married)
- Lucy M. Hall (1843–1907), physician, writer
- William Sargent Ladd, banker, 5th mayor of Portland, Oregon
- Horace Austin Warner Tabor, prospector, businessman, and politician
