= Moretown, Vermont =

- Town
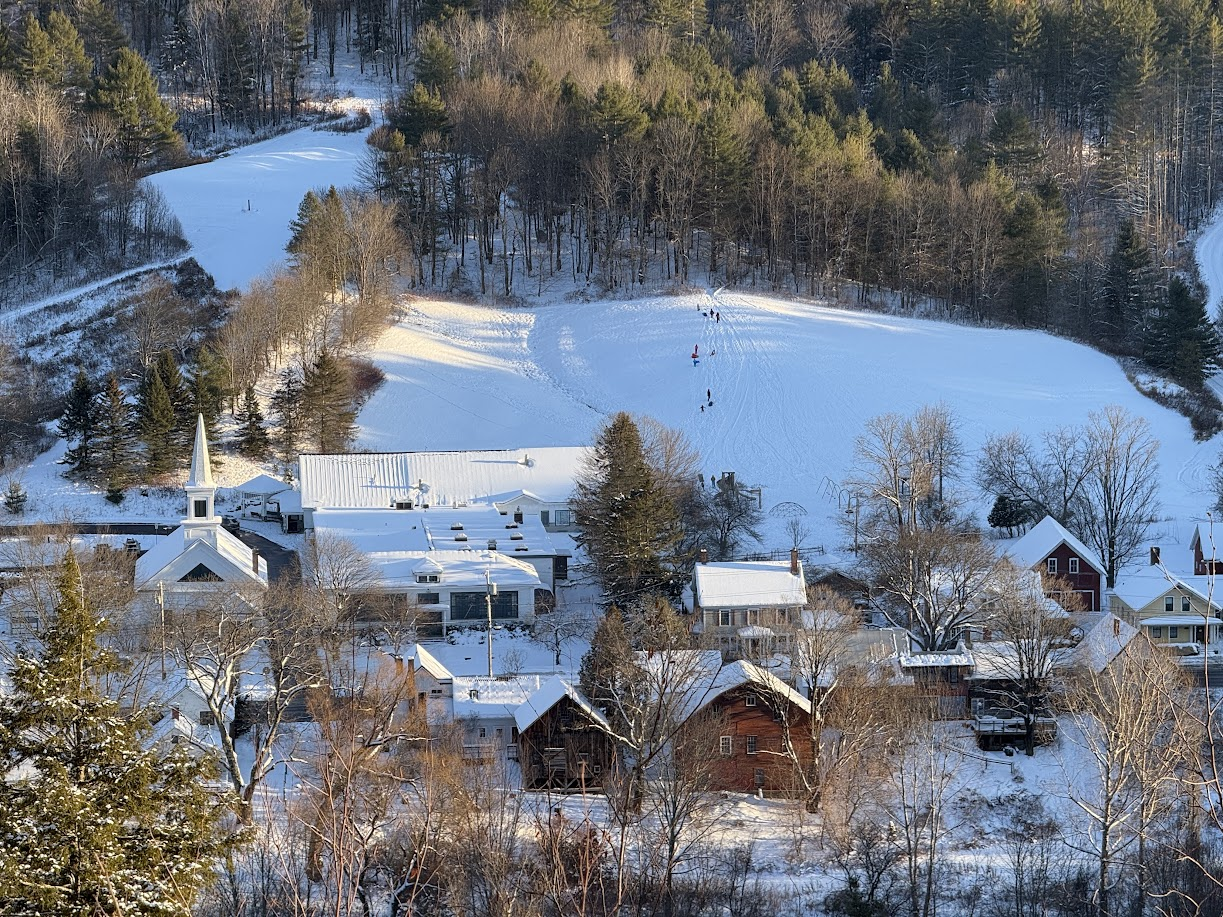
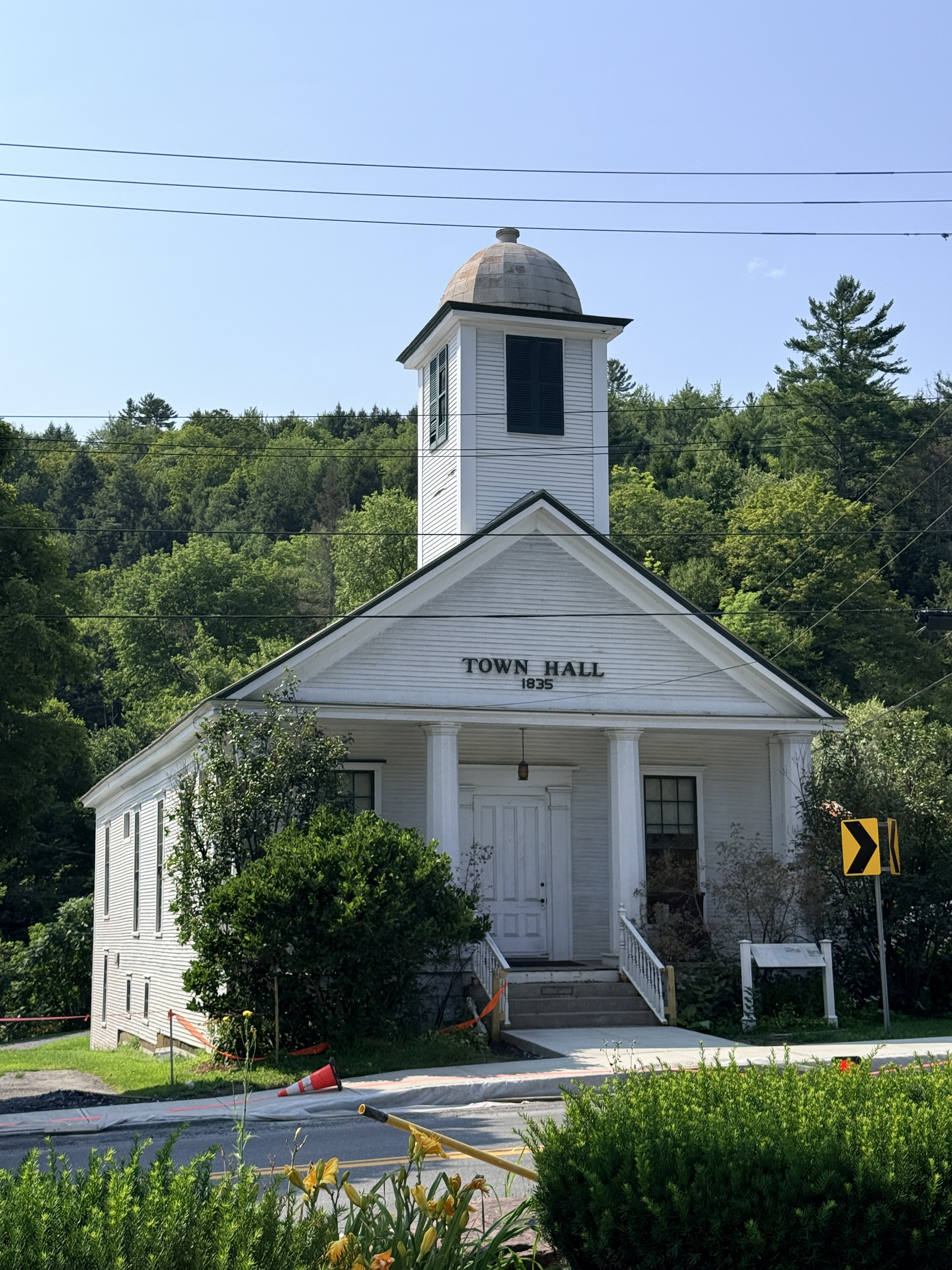
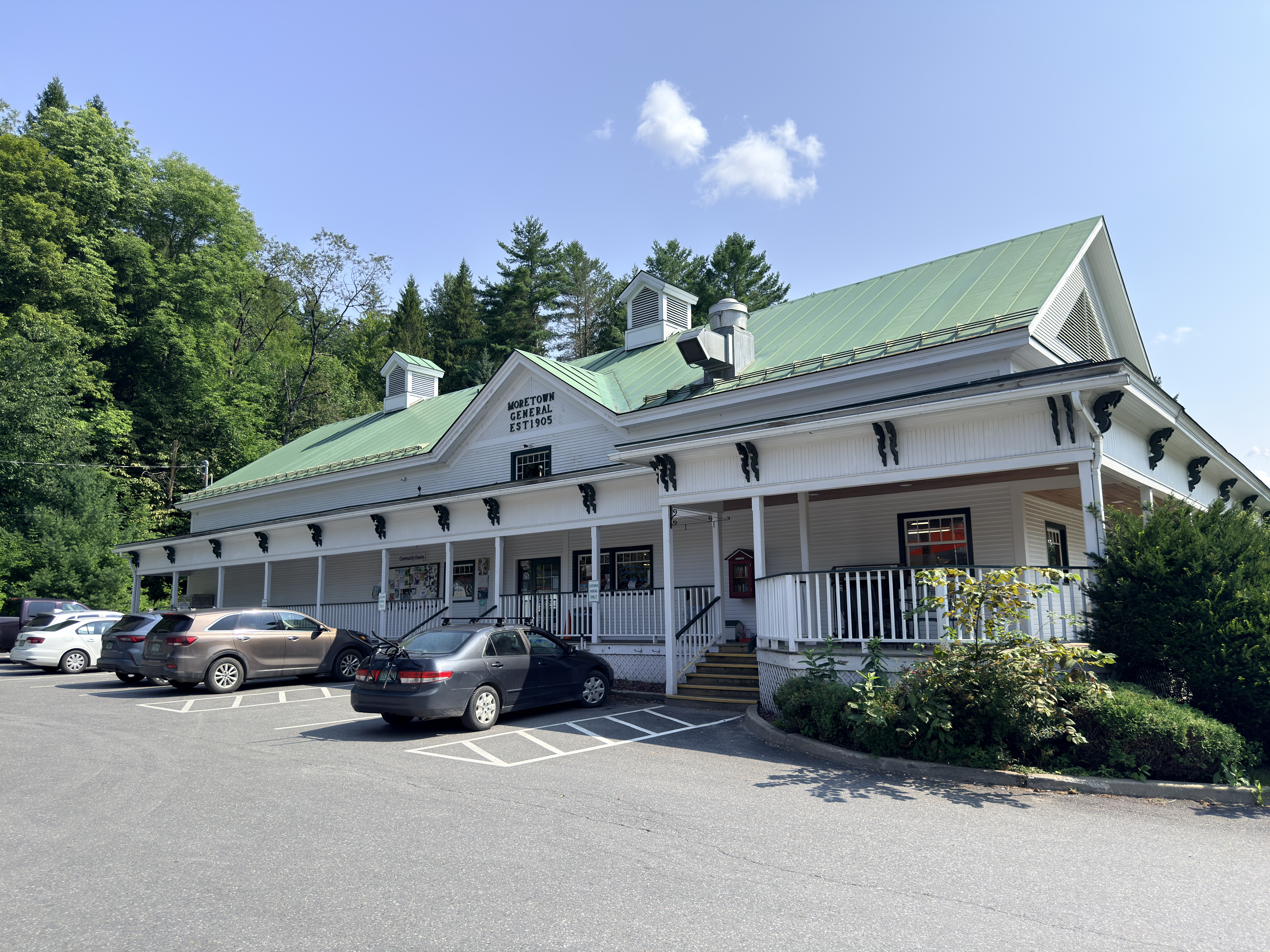
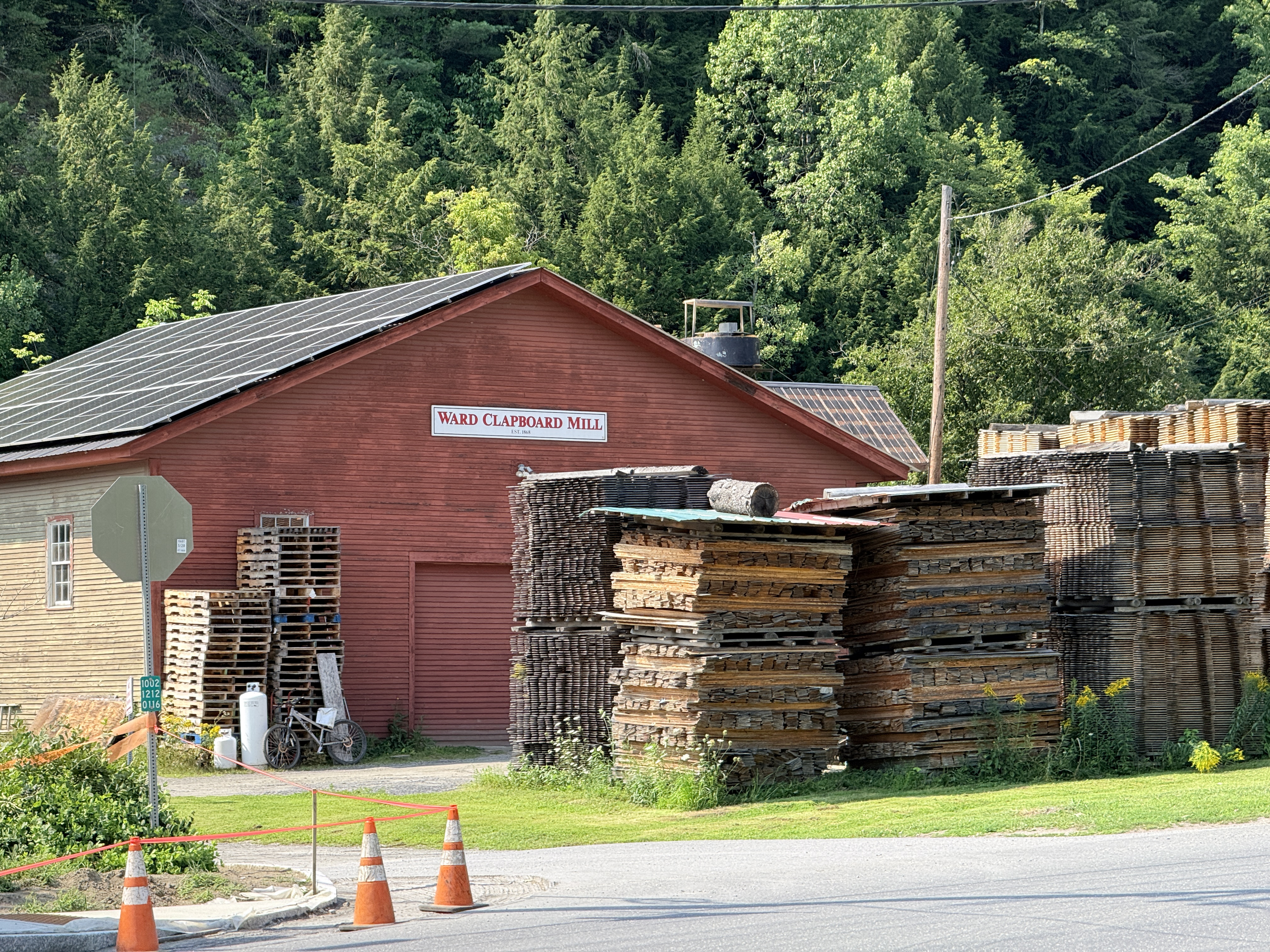
- View of Moretown Village Moretown Town Hall Moretown General Store Ward Clapboard Mill Moretown Memorial Library

- Location in Washington County and the state of Vermont
- Coordinates: 44°14′53″N 72°44′12″W
- Country: United States
- State: Vermont
- County: Washington
- Charter from New Hampshire: June 7, 1763; 263 years ago
- First Town Meeting: March 9, 1792
- Seat: Moretown Village
- Communities: Moretown Village; North Moretown; Moretown Common and South Hill; Mad River; River Road; Jones Brook; Cox Brook

Government
  - Type: Open Town Meeting

Area
  - Total: 40.2 sq mi (104.2 km^{2})
  - Land: 39.9 sq mi (103.3 km^{2})
  - Water: 0.31 sq mi (0.8 km^{2})
- Elevation: 1,673 ft (510 m)

Population (2020)
  - Total: 1,753
  - Density: 43.95/sq mi (16.97/km^{2})
- Time zone: UTC-5 (Eastern (EST))
  - Summer (DST): UTC-4 (EDT)
- ZIP Codes: 05660 (Moretown); 05602 (Montpelier); 05676 (Waterbury)
- Area code: 802
- FIPS code: 50-46225
- GNIS feature ID: 1462153
- Website: www.moretownvt.org

Moretown is a town in Washington County, Vermont, United States. The population was 1,753 at the 2020 census.

== Etymology ==
The original reason for the naming of Moretown has been lost to time, but there are several theories:

It may have been named in honor of members of the Morehouse family, whom were among the original settlers.

It is also theorized that Moretown was named when it was realized that there was one more town that had yet to be named on the map.

Bradford, Vermont was briefly named Mooretown between 1770 and 1788, before being renamed to its current name.

== History ==
=== Indigenous peoples ===
Evidence of humans living in the area which would become Moretown goes back about 11,000 years. Evidenced by a human-made fluted projectile point, which was located in Moretown near South Hill Road, dating to about 9,000 BCE.

=== Charter and organization (1763-1832) ===
Moretown was one of the 36 towns chartered by New Hampshire colonial Governor Benning Wentworth in 1763.

Due to the sight-unseen nature of these charters, the town's borders cut directly across mountains, valleys, and rivers. This has the effect of creating several isolated villages and neighborhoods in Moretown, rather than a cohesive center like the nearby towns of Waitsfield, Vermont or Waterbury, Vermont.

The first 17 years of the town saw no recorded settlement; the first settlers landed in the "North Moretown"/"Duxbury Corners" area of Moretown around 1790.

The first town meeting was held on March 9th, 1792 at the home of Moretown resident Joseph Haseltine.

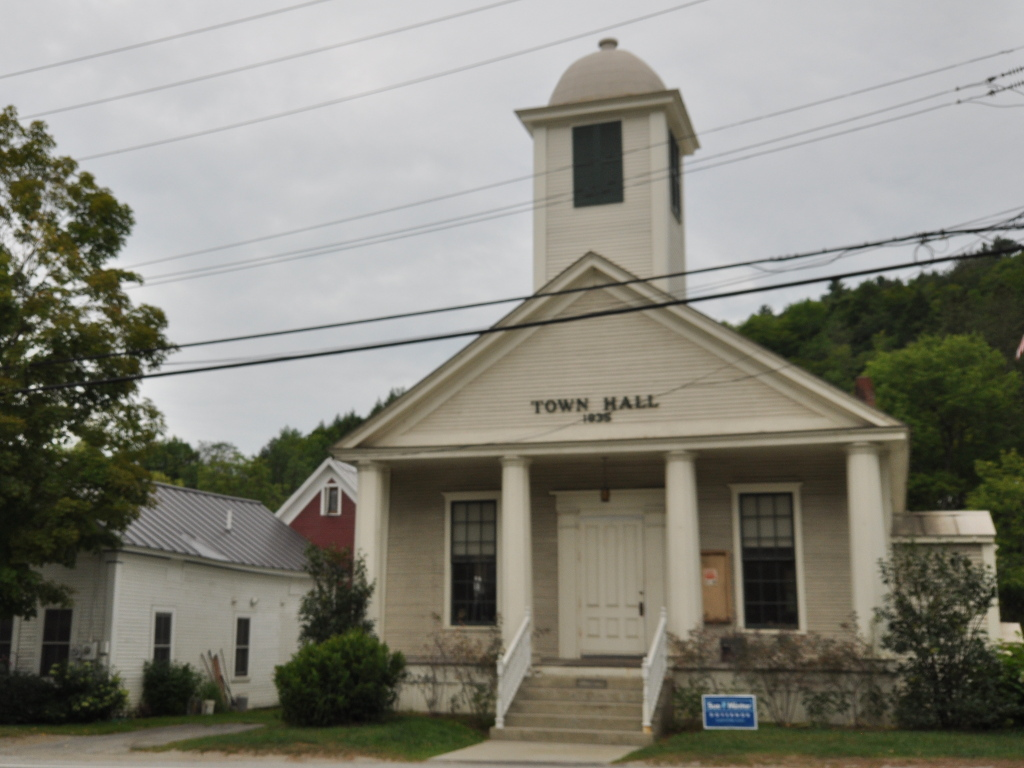
The Town Hall in 2016

Town meetings later moved to Moretown Common, and finally to Moretown Village in 1832, where they are held to this day. Money was then raised to construct a Town Hall, which was completed in 1832.

=== Early growth (1832-1870) ===
The lumber industry greatly contributed to Moretown’s early growth, aided by the power and transportation provided by the Mad River (Vermont) and the Winooski River.

The landscape in the mid-1800s was starkly different to the landscape of the modern era. Almost 50 years of logging and sheep farming cleared away massive tracts of native forest. Hill farming was a common practice in this era, with remnants of their stone walls still scattered throughout the forested hills of Moretown.

By the 1860s, Moretown had transformed into town dotted with commerce: including 2 general stores, 3 blacksmith shops, a hotel, harness shop, a door and window maker, a box factory, 2 carriage and sleigh shops, a dressmaker, 2 milliners, a goldsmith and a tinsmith.

=== Era of decline (1870-1960) ===
After peaking at 1,410 in 1860 census, the population of Moretown declined for 80 years, bottoming out at 675 in the 1940 census.

After the conclusion of the Civil War, dairy farming became more central to the economy of Moretown. This led to many hill farmers to move westward in search of more productive land. Others still left in search of cities where industry was booming.

The exodus was further exacerbated with the completion of the railroad and telegraph lines in the 1860s and 1870s. This made learning of and reaching opportunities out in the west much easier.

The Ward family established a lumber and milling business in the 1870s that became the primary employer in Moretown for many decades. They mainly constructed boxes, clapboards, and furniture components at two separate facilities. The "Upper Mill" and the "Lower Mill". The Upper Mill was the larger of the two, and burned down in 1955.

Electricity was first generated in Moretown in 1895. However, many residents were not able to purchase or make use of electricity for decades, and it was instead transmitted to larger cities like New York City or Boston. The Jones Brook schoolhouse wasn't electrified until 1951.

In 1913, 125 acres were purchased in North Moretown and a talc processing facility was built. To this day, the old structure remains a town landmark in disrepair.

=== Modern era (1960-Present) ===
The initial segment of Interstate 89 which stretched from Montpelier, Vermont to Waterbury opened in 1960. By 1965, the interstate was completed through Vermont. Interstate highways made a visit to Vermont a day trip for millions of people living in southern New England and New York, greatly expanding the role of tourism in the state’s economy.

Moretown Village was devastated in 2011 by Hurricane Irene. More than 60 homes and buildings flooded, including the post office, the town offices, the church, the school and the fire station.

== Geography ==
Moretown is characterized by forested hills, mountain streams, and farm fields flanking the Mad River.

According to the United States Census Bureau, the town has a total area of 40.2 square miles (104.2 km^{2}), of which 39.9 square miles (103.3 km^{2}) is land and 0.31 square miles (0.8 km^{2}), or 0.81%, is water.

== Demographics ==
Historical population
Census	Pop.	Note	%±
1790	24		—
1800	191		695.8%
1810	405		112.0%
1820	593		46.4%
1830	816		37.6%
1840	1,128		38.2%
1850	1,335		18.4%
1860	1,410		5.6%
1870	1,263		−10.4%
1880	1,180		−6.6%
1890	956		−19.0%
1900	902		−5.6%
1910	686		−23.9%
1920	930		35.6%
1930	889		−4.4%
1940	675		−24.1%
1950	883		30.8%
1960	788		−10.8%
1970	904		14.7%
1980	1,221		35.1%
1990	1,415		15.9%
2000	1,653		16.8%
2010	1,658		0.3%
2020	1,753		5.7%
U.S. Decennial Census

As of the census of 2000, there were 1,653 people, 650 households, and 436 families residing in the town. The population density was 41.2 people per square mile (15.9/km^{2}). There were 727 housing units at an average density of 18.1 per square mile (7.0/km^{2}). The racial makeup of the town was 98.19% White, 0.12% Native American, 0.79% Asian, 0.12% from other races, and 0.79% from two or more races. Hispanic or Latino of any race were 0.67% of the population.

There were 650 households, out of which 35.7% had children under the age of 18 living with them, 55.1% were married couples living together, 8.6% had a female householder with no husband present, and 32.8% were non-families. 22.3% of all households were made up of individuals, and 7.7% had someone living alone who was 65 years of age or older. The average household size was 2.54 and the average family size was 3.01.

In the town, the population was spread out, with 26.6% under the age of 18, 5.2% from 18 to 24, 31.8% from 25 to 44, 27.0% from 45 to 64, and 9.4% who were 65 years of age or older. The median age was 38 years. For every 100 females, there were 99.6 males. For every 100 females age 18 and over, there were 97.2 males.

The median income for a household in the town was $47,750, and the median income for a family was $52,202. Males had a median income of $35,270 versus $26,719 for females. The per capita income for the town was $20,283. About 5.4% of families and 6.6% of the population were below the poverty line, including 5.6% of those under age 18 and 7.9% of those age 65 or over.

== Morefest ==
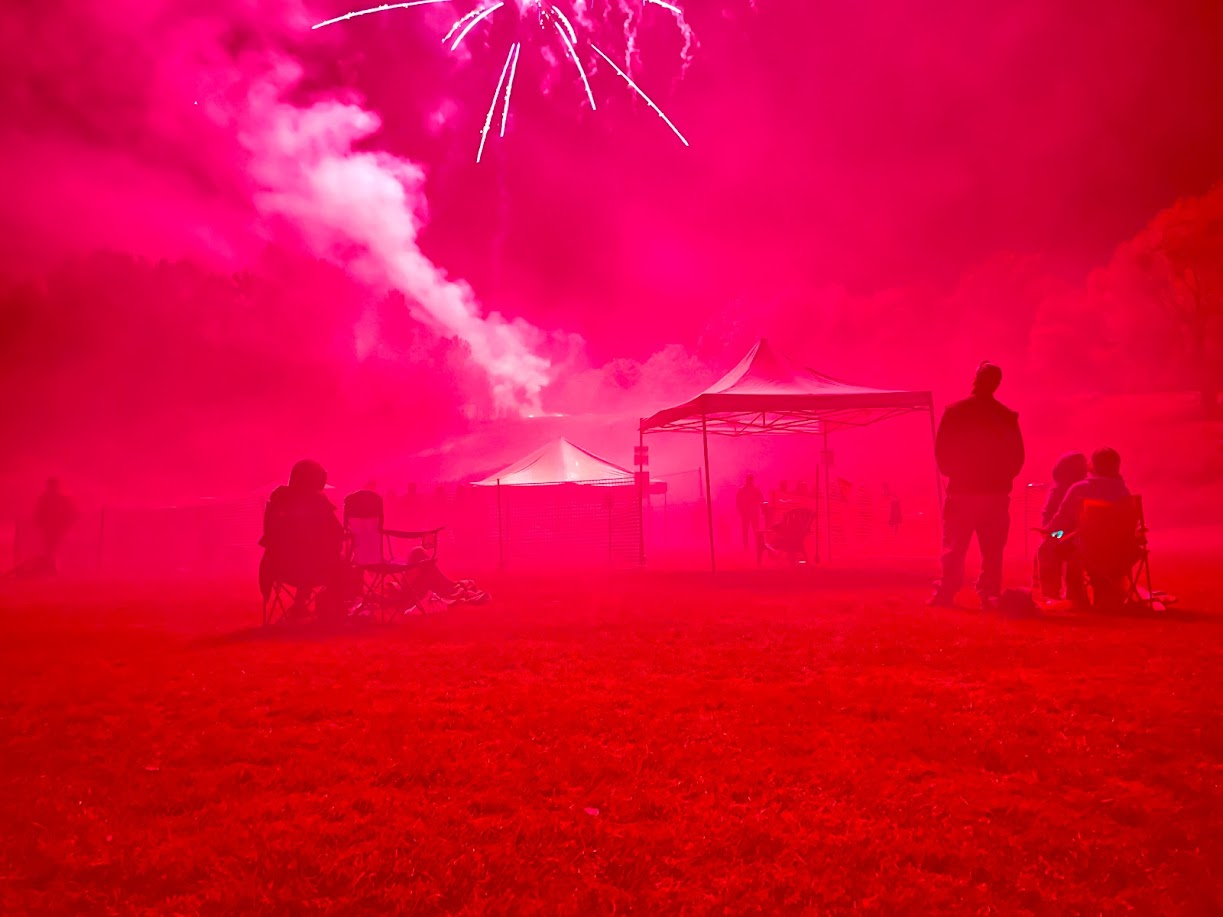
A photograph of the fireworks show during the 2021 Morefest celebration.

The Morefest festival is held annually in Moretown. Typically celebrated in September, the festival involves vendors, a car show, and a fireworks display.

== Economy ==
Moretown has one retail store, The Moretown General Store, which serves as a gas station, convenience store and delicatessen. The Moretown general store is the center of the town, which often serves as a meeting place and is in many ways a community center.

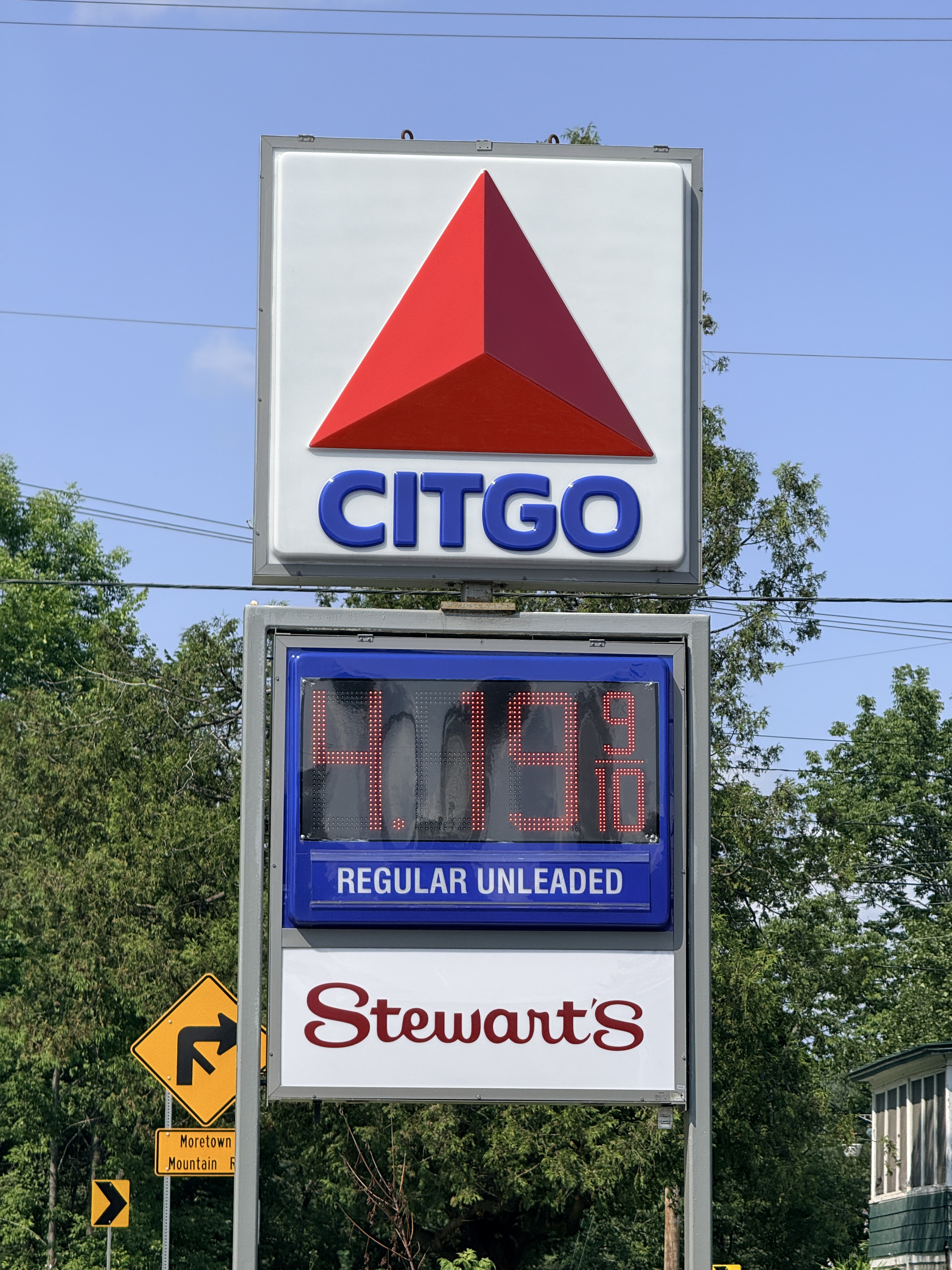
Gas Station Sign updated with Stewart's Shops branding

The Moretown General Store was purchased by the Stewart's Shops chain in 2026; designated store #506.

Moretown is also home to many successful entrepreneurs in fields such as real estate, carpentry, baking, plumbing, and other trades; however, most residents commute to work in other towns with larger economies such as Montpelier and Burlington.

Moretown also has several small farms, a clapboard mill, three churches, one elementary school, a small library, and a town hall.

== Education ==
It is in the Harwood Unified Union School District. The comprehensive high school of the district is the Harwood Union Middle and High School.

== Notable people ==
- Matthew H. Carpenter, US senator from Wisconsin
- Harvey Clapp, member of the Wisconsin State Assembly, was born in Moretown
- William B. Mayo, Medical doctor and politician in Northfield, Vermont

== Gallery ==
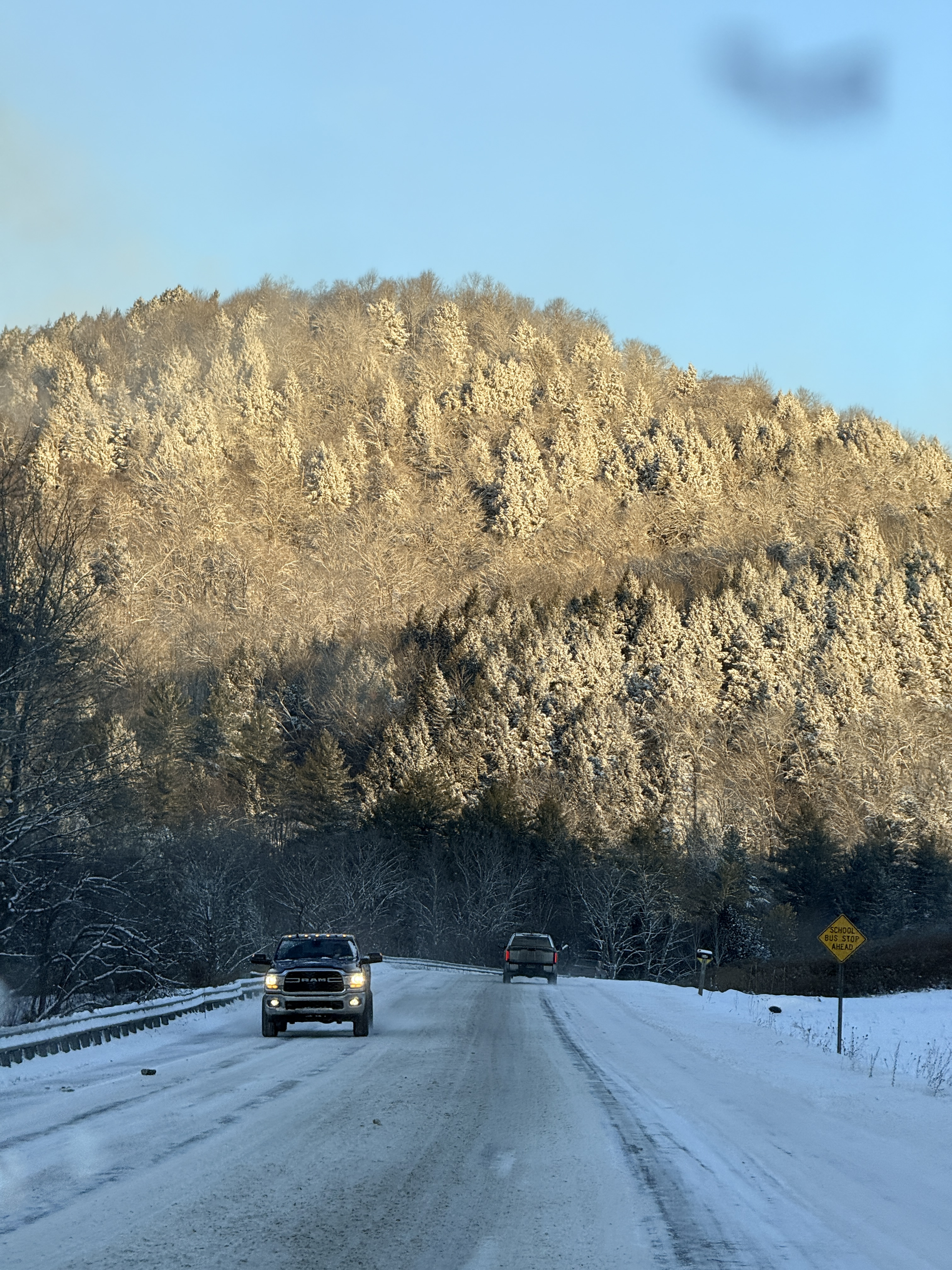
Driving north on Route 100B in the winter

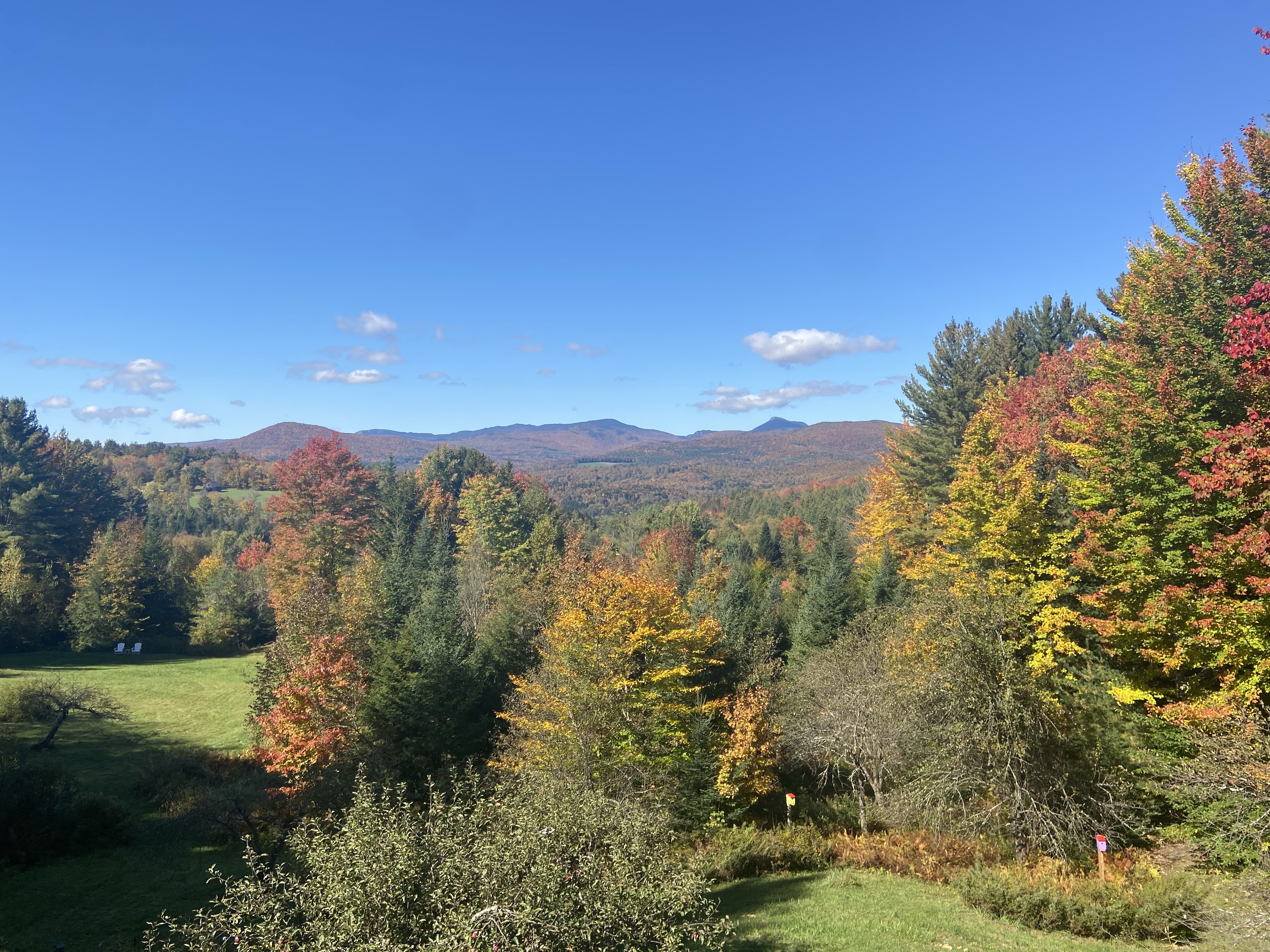
Camel's Hump viewed from Moretown in autumn.

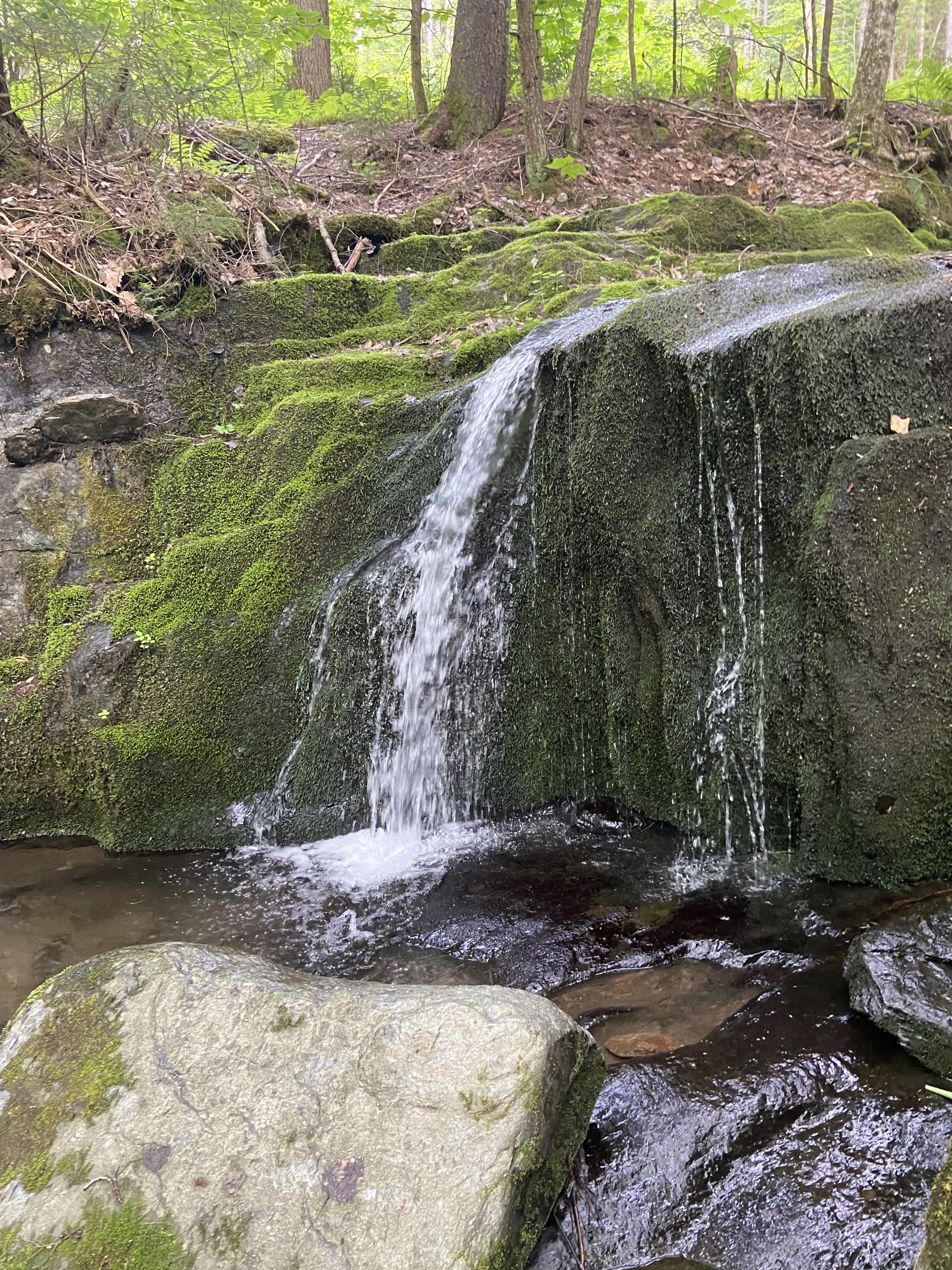
A creek near Moretown Common

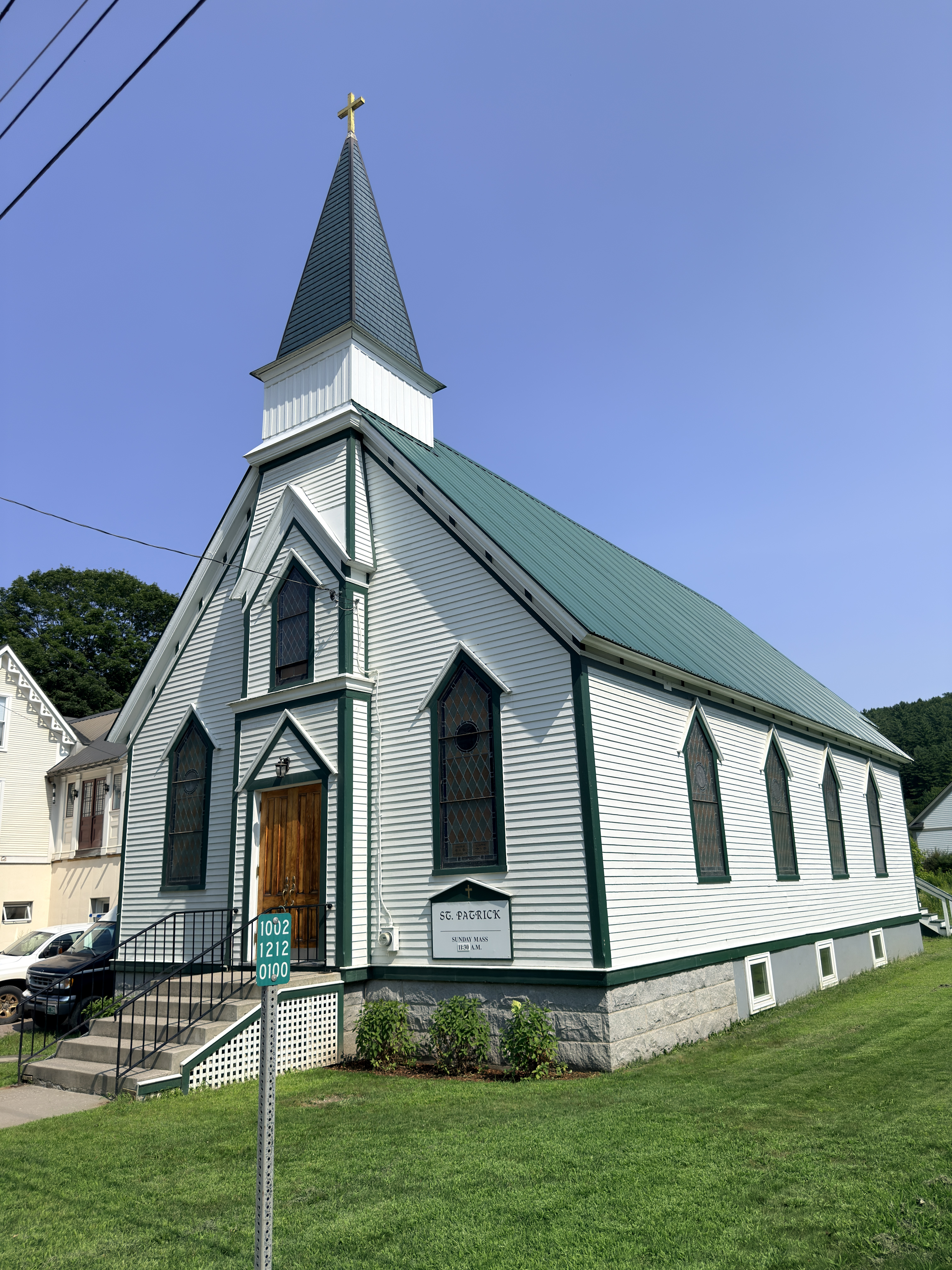
Saint Patrick Church

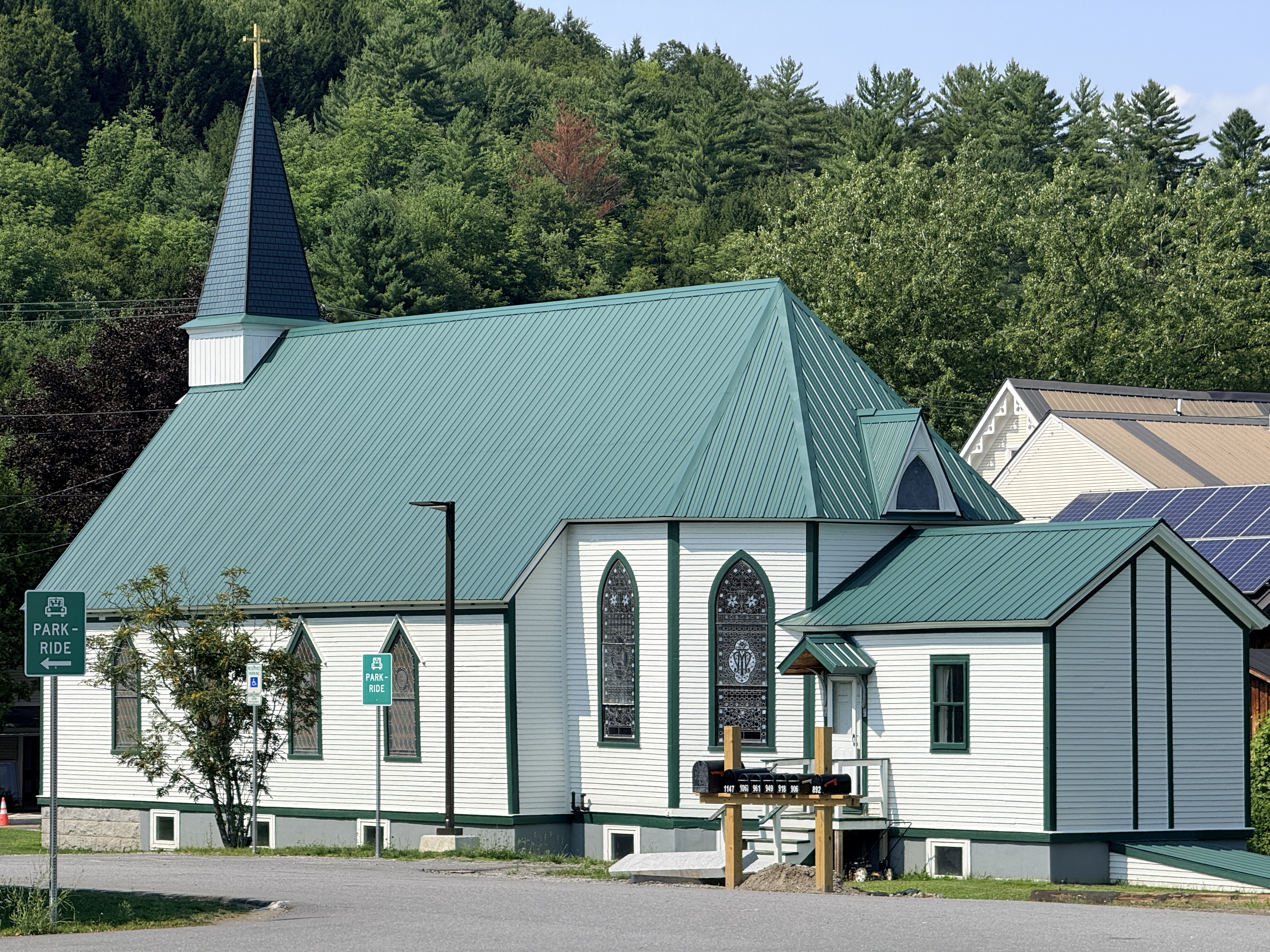
Backside of Saint Patrick Church

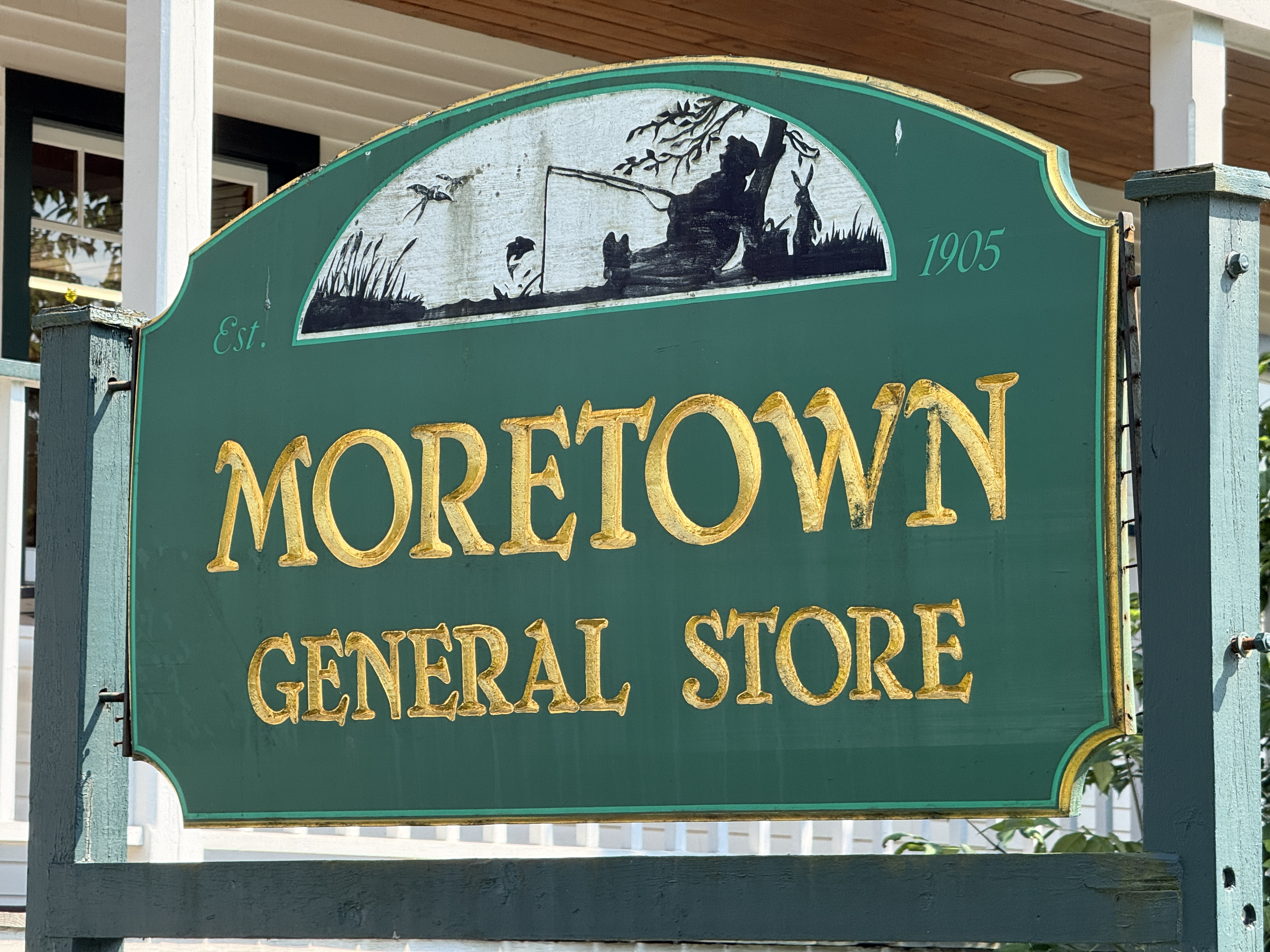
Moretown General Store Sign

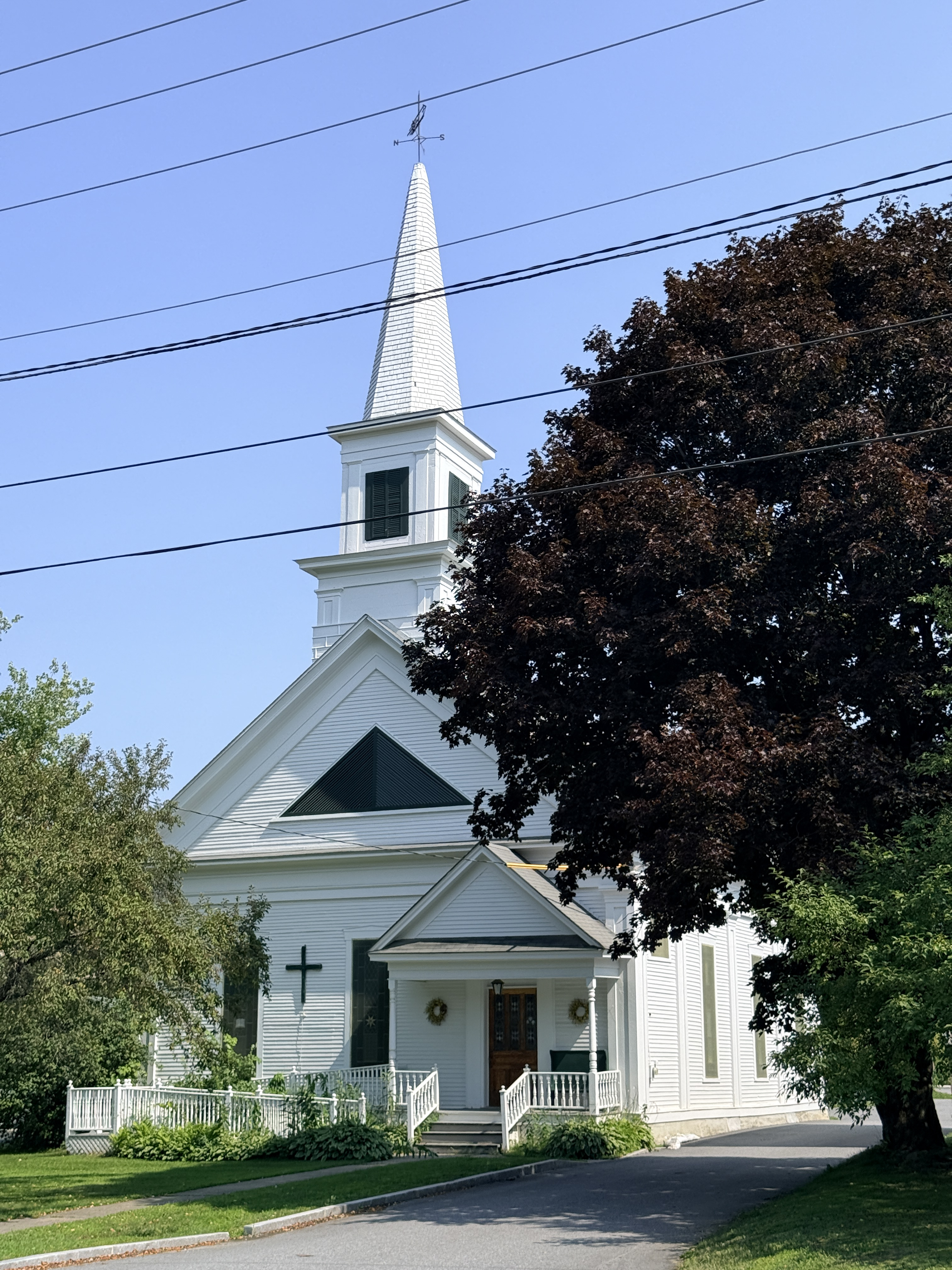
United Methodist Church

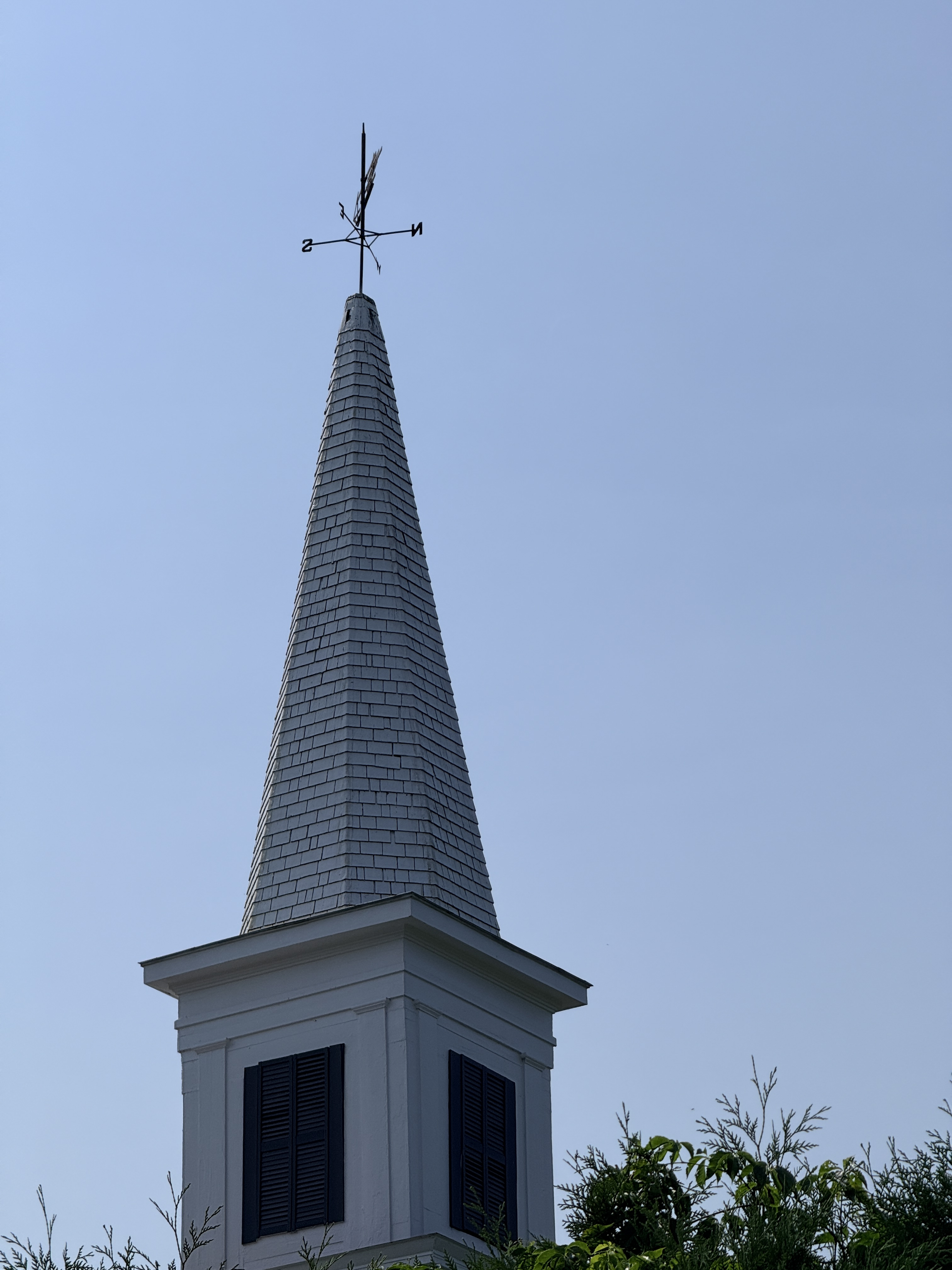
United Methodist Church Steeple

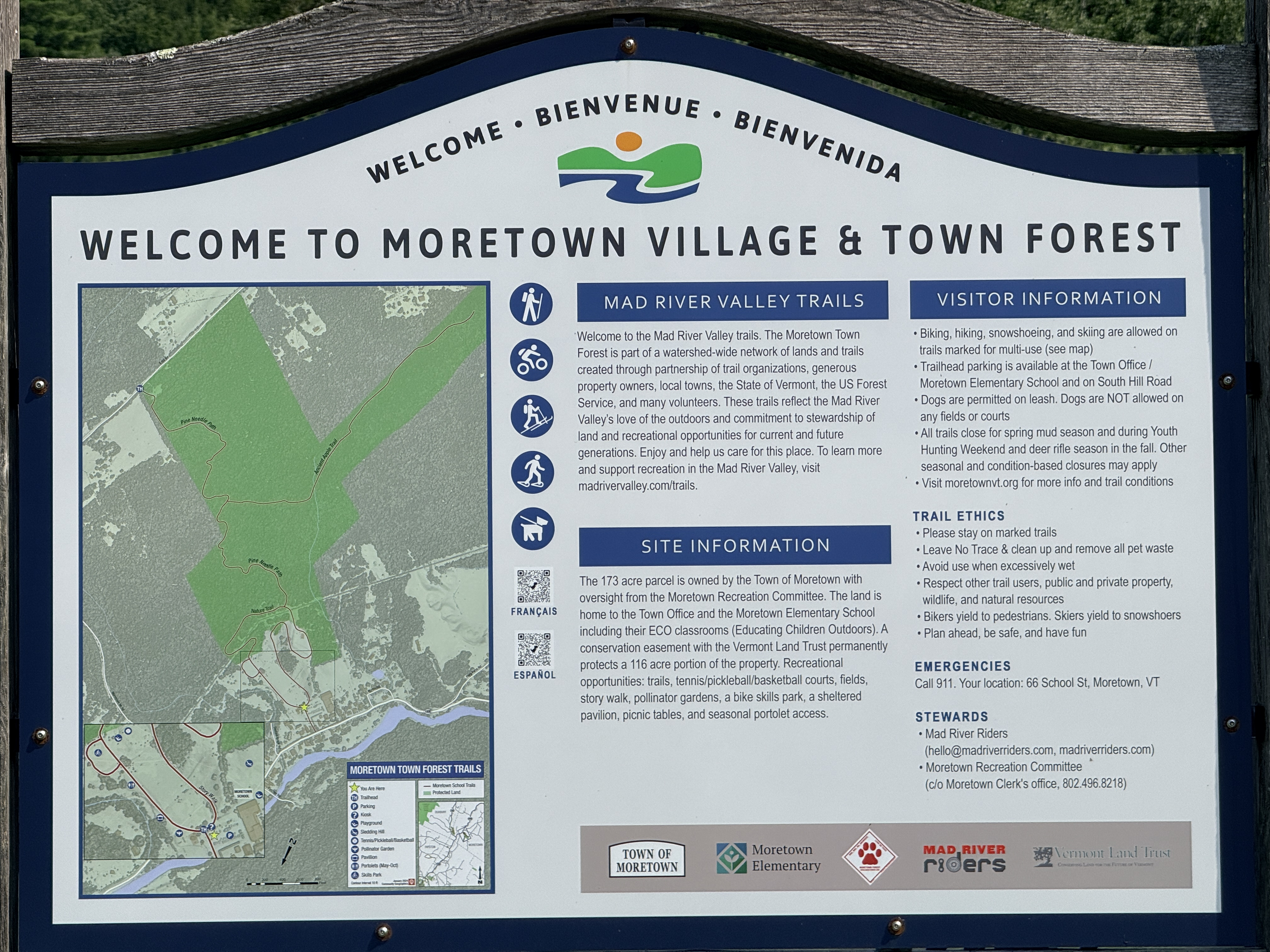
Moretown Village & Town Forest Information

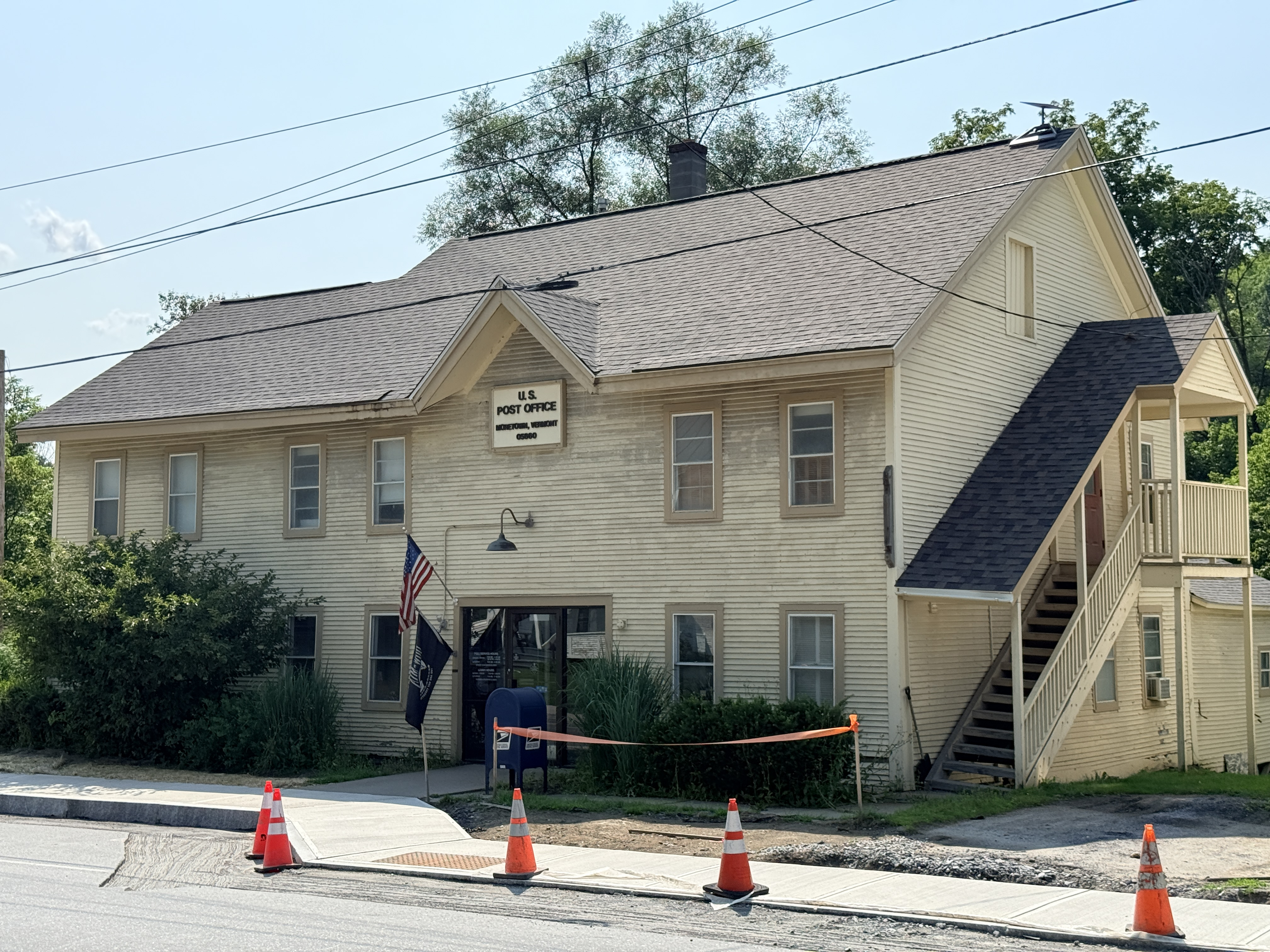
Post Office

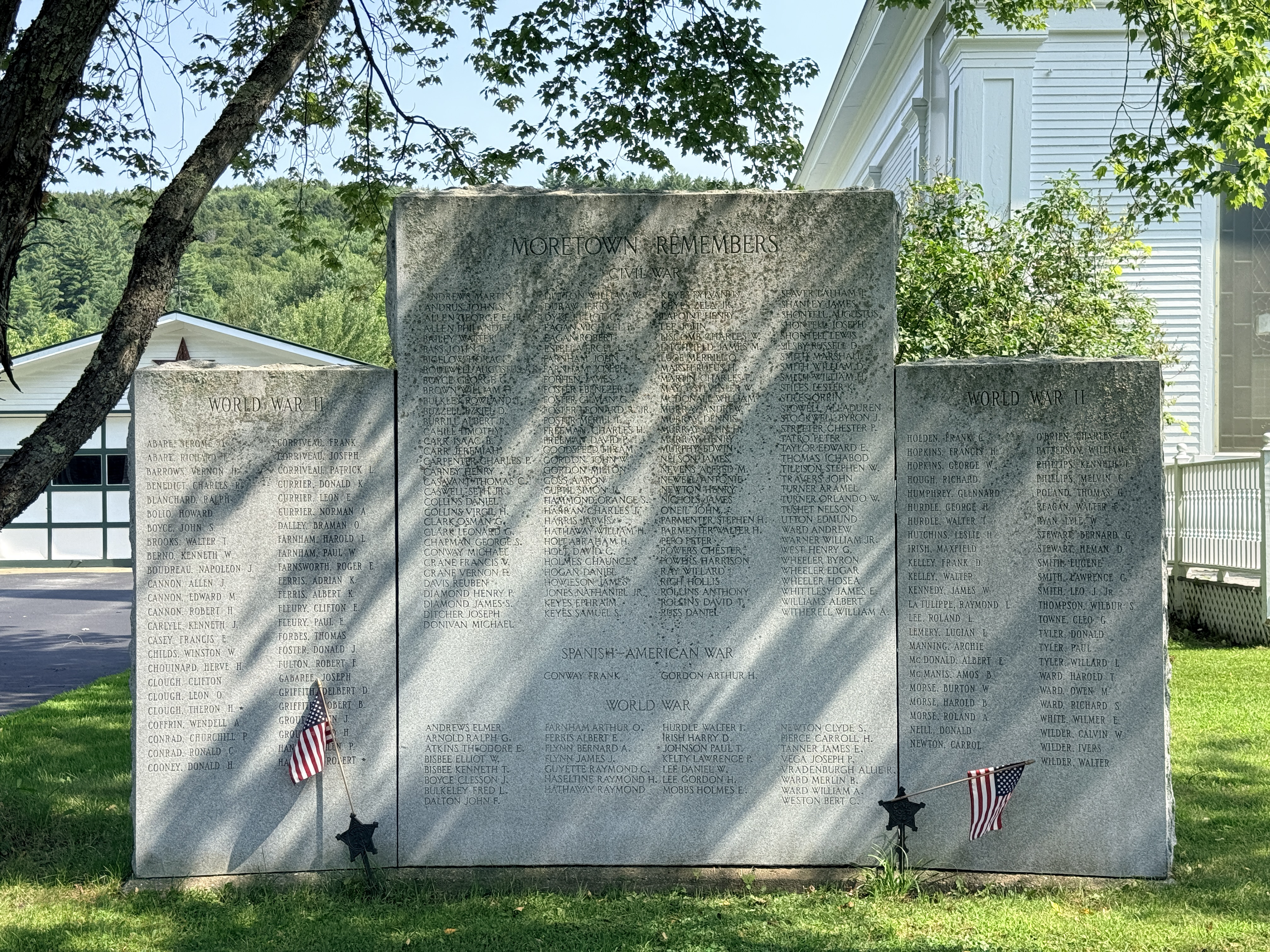
Main War Memorial

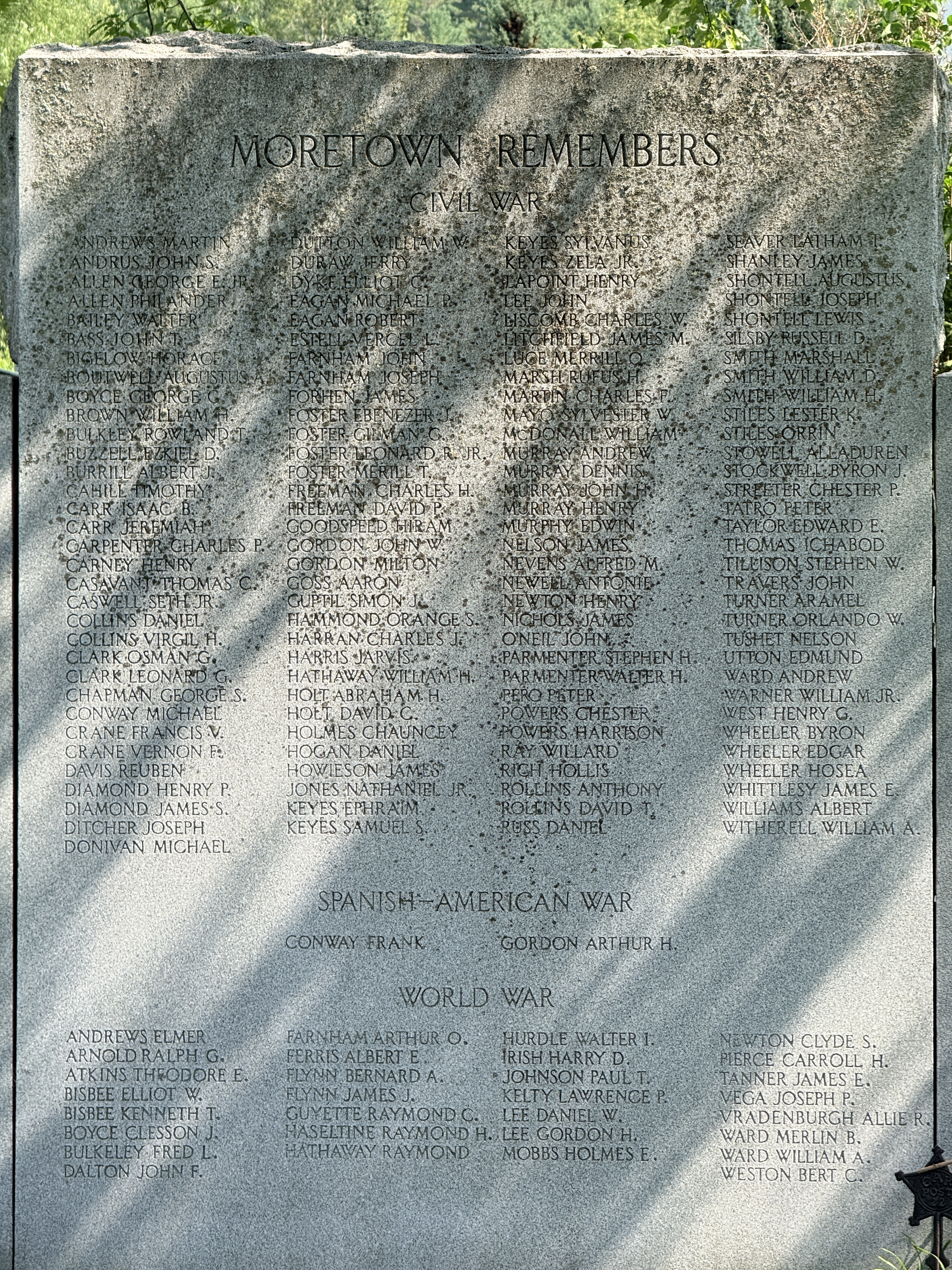
Main Slab of the War Memorial

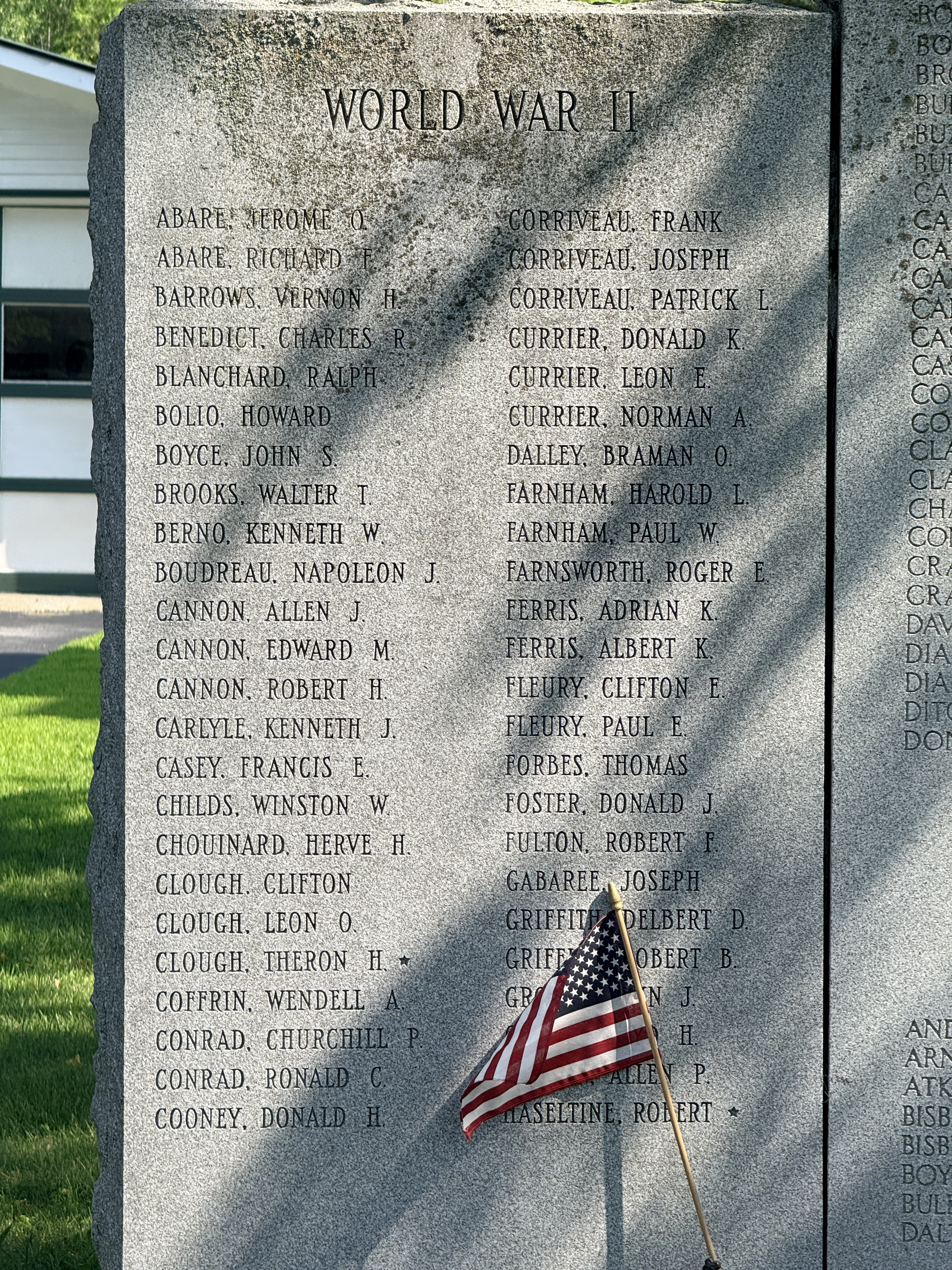
Detail View of 1st WWII Section of War Memorial

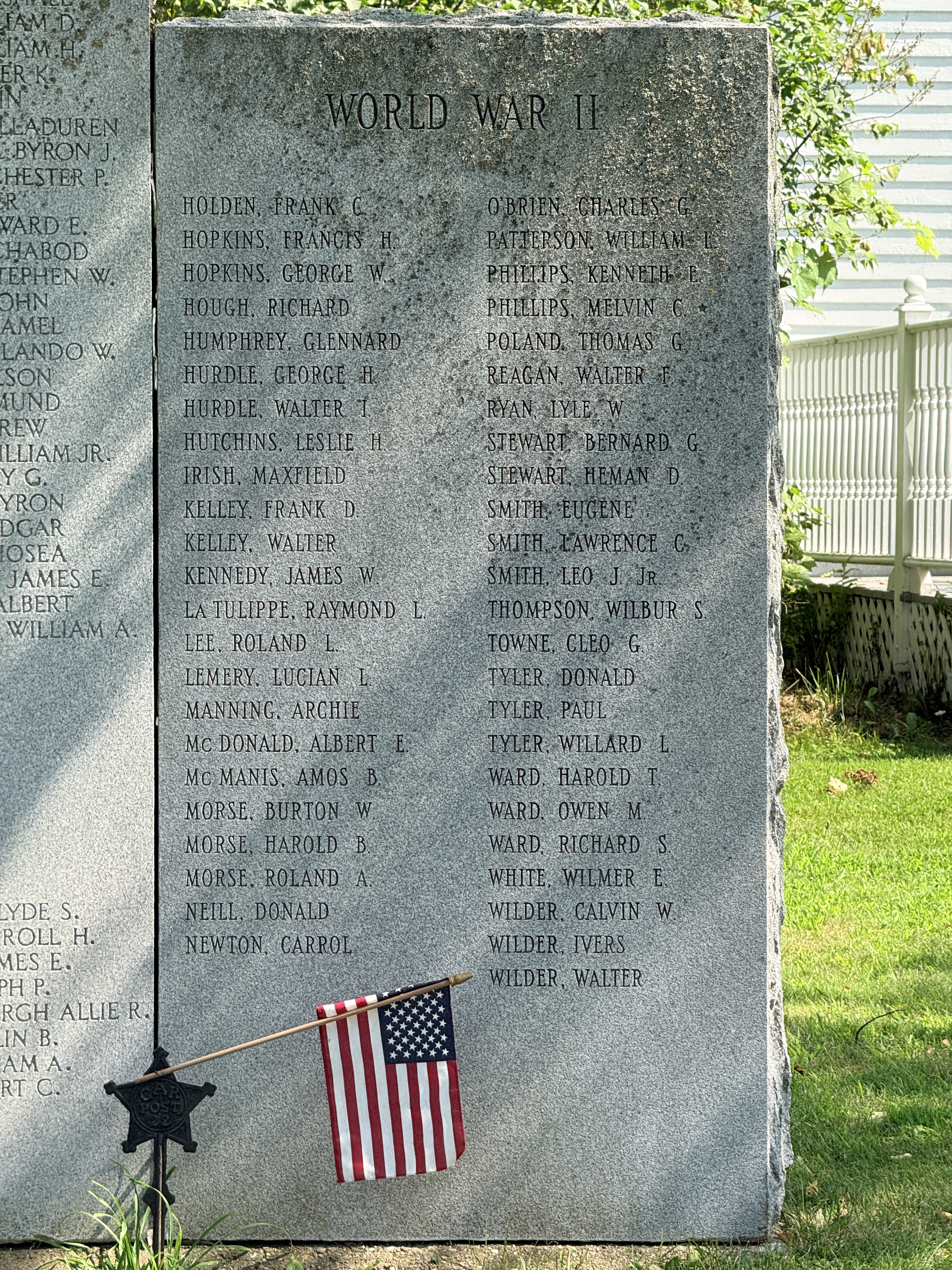
Detail View of 2nd WWII Section of War Memorial

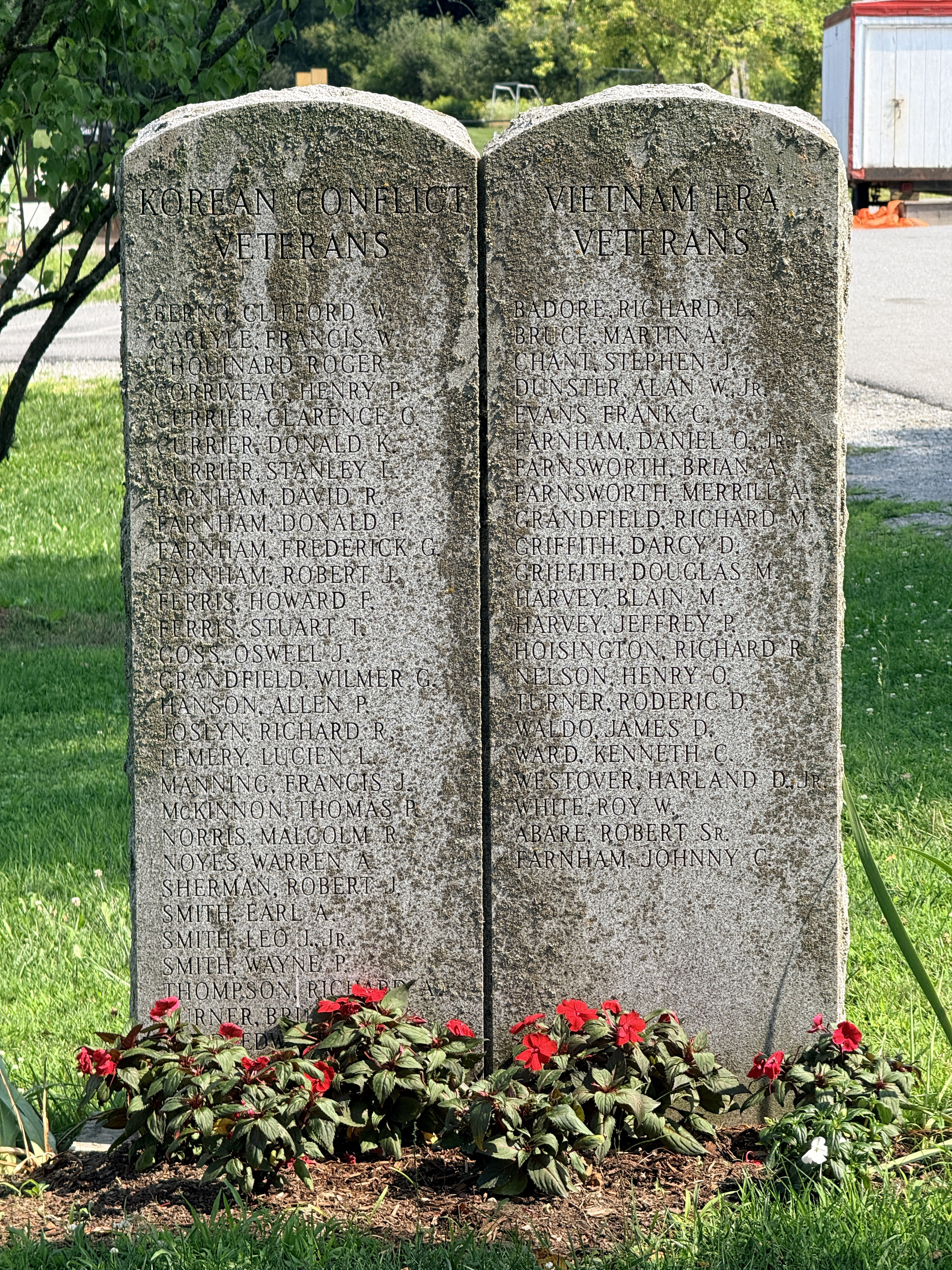
Vietnam War and Korean Conflict Memorial

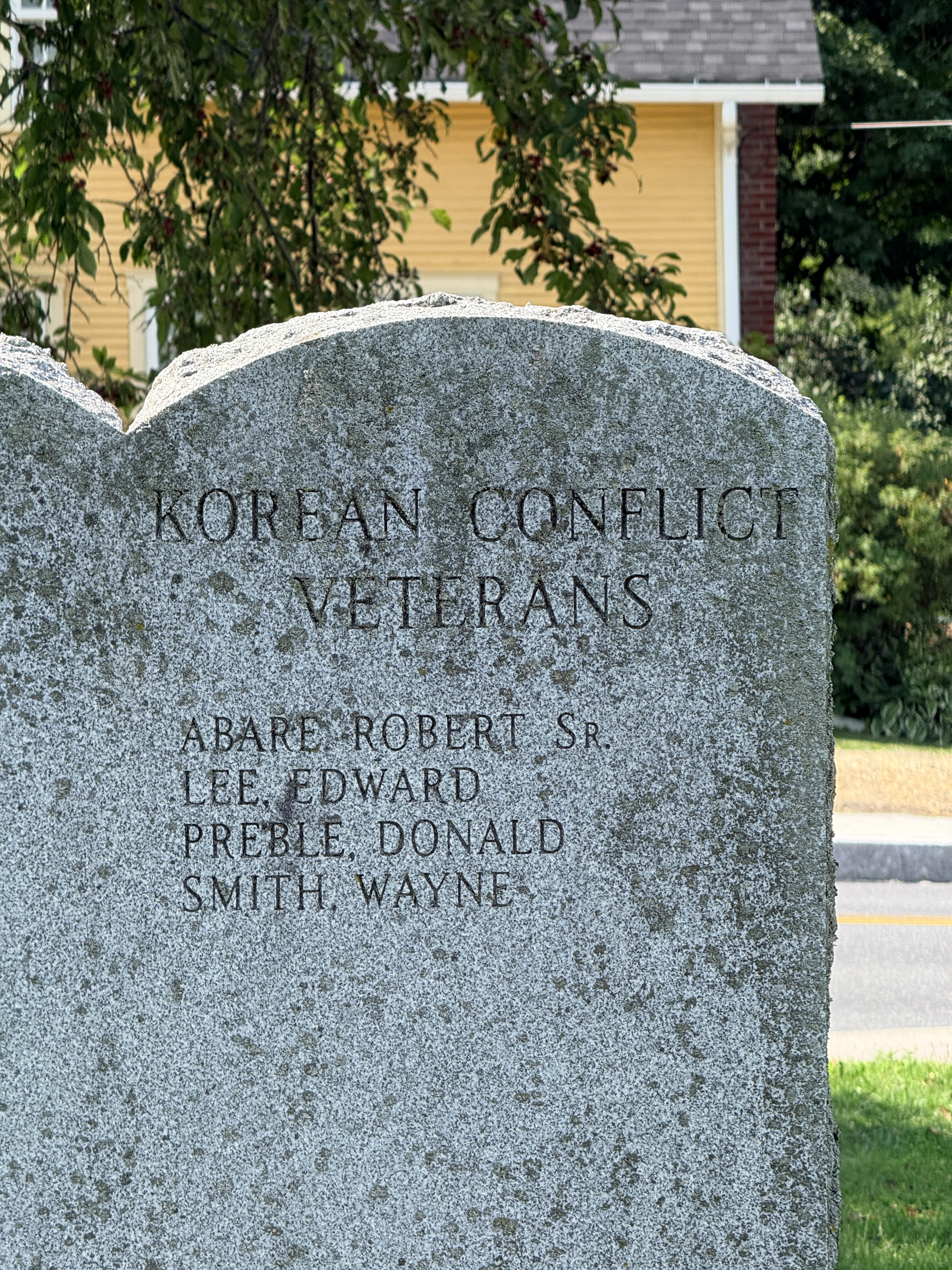
Backside of Vietnam War and Korean Conflict Memorial
