= Camel's Hump Natural Area =

State Natural Area in Chittenden and Washington counties, Vermont

- Location within Vermont
- Location: Vermont, United States
- Nearest city: Burlington, Vermont
- Coordinates: 44.3195°N 72.8865°W
- Area: 7,850 acres (31.8 km^{2})
- Created: 1965
- Administrator: Vermont Department of Forests, Parks and Recreation

Camel's Hump Natural Area is a protected area in the U.S. state of Vermont. The natural area, wholly contained within Camel's Hump State Park, straddles the ridge of the Green Mountains in Chittenden and Washington counties, in the towns of Duxbury, Huntington, Fayston, Bolton, and Buels Gore. Administered by the Vermont Department of Forests, Parks and Recreation, Camel's Hump Natural Area is the largest natural area in Vermont.

== Description ==
Camel's Hump Natural Area was created in 1965, with significant additions made in 1969 and 1995. The focal point of the natural area is Camel's Hump, the highest mountain in Camel's Hump State Park. The natural area consists of the following sub-areas:

1. All public lands in a designated ecological area in Camel's Hump Forest Reserve:
  1. All public lands in the forest reserve above 2,500 ft (760 m), which includes 4,405 acres (1,783 ha)
  2. All land in the Gleason Brook watershed (north of Camel's Hump) above 900 ft (270 m), which includes 1,303 acres (527 ha)
2. All land in the Ecological Protection Zone in Phen Basin (in the southeast corner of Camel's Hump State Park), which includes 2,142 acres (867 ha)

Altogether Camel's Hump Natural Area covers a total of 7,850 acres (3,180 ha), making it the largest natural area in the state.

== Biodiversity ==
Camel's Hump Natural Area includes 10 acres (4.0 ha) of alpine tundra, one of three such plant communities in Vermont. The natural area also supports an undisturbed subalpine boreal forest of balsam fir, red spruce, and heartleaf paper birch. There are at least 10 species of animals and 24 species of plants in the natural area thought to be rare or very rare. Some of these are protected by the Vermont endangered and threatened species rule, including Boott's rattlesnake-root (Nabalus boottii, generically known as white lettuce), bearberry willow (Salix uva-ursi), lesser wintergreen (Pyrola minor), alpine sweetgrass (Anthoxanthum monticola), and squashberry (Viburnum edule).

== History ==
In 1911, Joseph Battell, a publisher, environmentalist, and philanthropist from Middlebury, donated 1,147 acres (464 ha) of forest land surrounding Camel's Hump to the State of Vermont. The deed declared that the "trees growing on the land herein conveyed are not to be cut...and the whole forest is to be preserved in a primeval state." A half century later, in 1965, the state created Camel's Hump Natural Area, a 1,086-acre (439 ha) protected area that included a portion of the Battell lands within its boundary.

In 1969, as a by-product of creating Camel's Hump State Park, the State of Vermont designated an ecological area that included all state lands in Camel's Hump Forest Reserve above 2,500 ft (760 m) plus all land in the Gleason Brook watershed above 900 ft (270 m). The ecological area, which was meant "to protect scarce and rare plants, to preserve the natural habitat, and to maintain the wilderness aspect" of the land, expanded Camel's Hump Natural Area to 5,708 acres (2,310 ha).

In 1995, the State of Vermont acquired the 2,700-acre (1,100 ha) Phen Basin parcel in Fayston. Approximately 80% of the parcel was designated as an Ecological Protection Zone intended to foster the conservation of wildlife, habitats, forestry values, public recreational opportunities, and scenic resources. With the addition of the Ecological Protection Zone, Camel's Hump Natural Area grew to its current size of 7,850 acres (3,180 ha).

== Bibliography ==
- Alfieri, Amy; Chipman, Brian; Gobeille, John; Johnson, Michael; Leonard, Matthew; Nerenberg, Jason; Peterson, Robert; Sausville, David; Sabourin, Gary; Zaino, Robert (2017). "Camel's Hump Management Unit: Long Range Management Plan" (PDF). State of Vermont: Agency of Natural Resources; Department of Forests, Parks and Recreation; Fish and Wildlife Department.
- Alfieri, Amy; Bates, Karen; Gobeille, John; Johnson, Michael; Leonard, Matthew; Mikula, Toni; Nerenberg, Jason; Peterson, Robert; Sausville, David; Simard, Lee; Wrigley, Kathryn; Zaino, Robert; Baron, Bill; Chipman, Brian; Sabourin, Gary; Sawyer, Gary (October 2021). "Camel's Hump Management Unit: Long Range Management Plan" (PDF). State of Vermont, Agency of Natural Resources: Department of Forests, Parks and Recreation; Fish and Wildlife Department.
