= Huntington Gap Wildlife Management Area =

Wildlife management area in Vermont, US

- Location within Vermont
- Location: Vermont, United States
- Nearest city: Burlington
- Coordinates: 44.2452°N 72.9174°W
- Area: 1,602 acres (648 ha)
- Owner: State of Vermont
- Administrator: Vermont Fish & Wildlife Department

Huntington Gap Wildlife Management Area is a wildlife management area in the U.S. state of Vermont. It consists of 1,602 acres (648 ha) in the towns of Huntington, Buels Gore, and Fayston. The area is owned by the State of Vermont and administered by the Vermont Fish & Wildlife Department.

The Huntington Gap Wildlife Management Area is approximately 2 miles (3.2 km) north of Vermont Route 17 in Chittenden and Washington counties. The area is wholly contained within Camel's Hump Forest Reserve. It is bordered by Camel's Hump State Park on the north, south, and west. Its far western boundary extends to Lewis Creek Wildlife Management Area.

== Description ==
The most prominent feature in the Huntington Gap Wildlife Management Area (WMA) is Huntington Gap, a low saddle on the eastern edge of the WMA. The Long Trail, the Catamount Trail, and a VAST snowmobile trail pass through Huntington Gap.

The spine of the Green Mountains runs along the eastern edge of the WMA. The summit of Beane Mountain (2,860 ft or 870 m) is just outside the southern edge of the WMA. There are multiple points in the WMA above 2,800 feet (850 m); the highest such point is 2,865 feet (873 m) in the southeast corner. By comparison, the altitude drops to 1,100 feet (340 m) at the far western edge of the WMA.

The Huntington Gap Wildlife Management Area is completely covered by forest, a mix of northern hardwoods (sugar maple, yellow birch, American beech, eastern hemlock), red spruce, balsam fir, and mountain paper birch. Baker's Brook flows through the southern portion of the WMA; the source of Jones Brook is located in the northern portion of the WMA.

== Bibliography ==
- Alfieri, Amy; Chipman, Brian; Gobeille, John; Johnson, Michael; Leonard, Matthew; Nerenberg, Jason; Peterson, Robert; Sausville, David; Sabourin, Gary; Zaino, Robert (2017). "Camel's Hump Management Unit: Long Range Management Plan" (PDF). State of Vermont: Agency of Natural Resources; Department of Forests, Parks and Recreation; Fish and Wildlife Department.
