= Mount Ellen (Vermont) =

Mountain in Vermont, U.S.

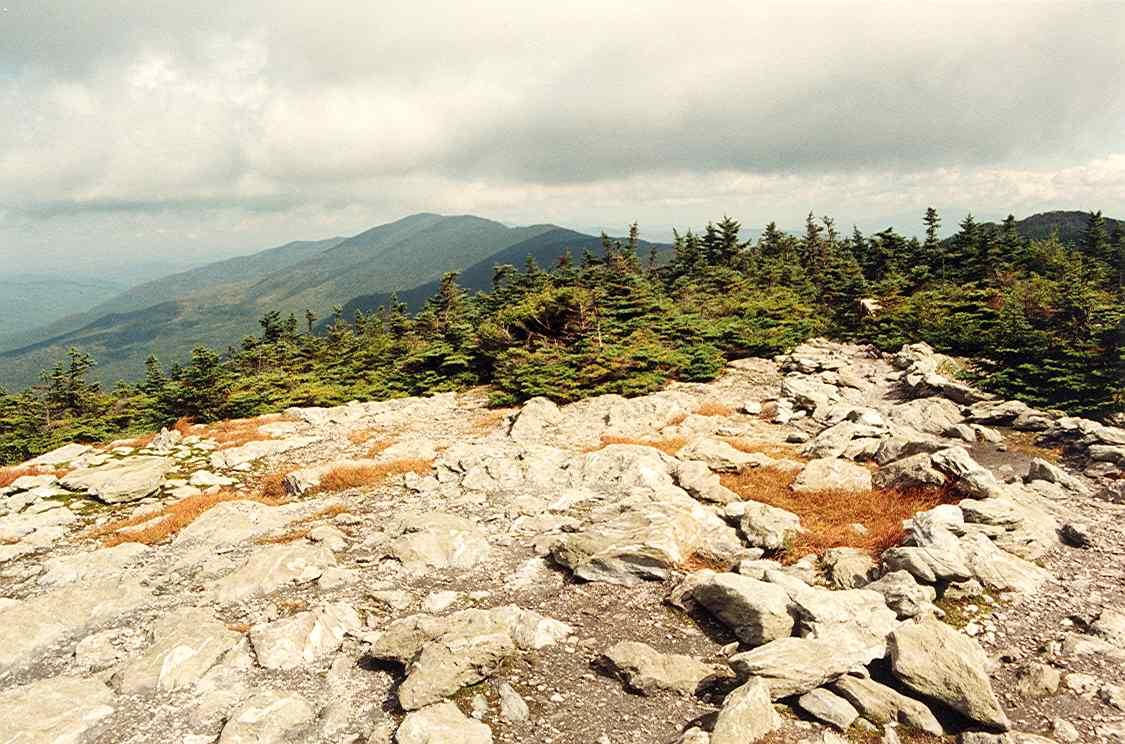
- Mount Ellen seen from Mount Abraham

Highest point
- Elevation: 4,083 ft (1,244 m)
- Prominence: 2,132 ft (650 m)
- Listing: New England 4000 footers; Mountains of Vermont
- Coordinates: 44°09′36″N 072°55′44″W

Geography
- Location within Vermont
- Country: United States
- State: Vermont
- County: Washington
- Town: Warren
- Parent range: Green Mountains
- Topo map: USGS Mount Ellen 1:24,000

Mount Ellen is a mountain in the Green Mountains in the U.S. state of Vermont. Located at the northern edge of the Green Mountain National Forest in Washington County, the summit of Mount Ellen is in the northwest corner of Warren but the mountain extends into Fayston to the north and Lincoln to the west. Together with Lincoln Peak to the south, the slopes of Mount Ellen are home to the Sugarbush Resort.

Mount Ellen is one of a handful of 4,000-foot (1,200 m) peaks in Vermont. At 4,083 feet (1,244 m), it is tied (with Camel's Hump) for the third-highest mountain in the state.

== History ==
The origin of the mountain's name is unclear. One theory is that Joseph Battell, a publisher, environmentalist, and philanthropist from Middlebury, Vermont, named Mount Ellen after the fictional character in his book "Ellen, or the Whisperings of an Old Pine" published in 1903. Another theory is that the mountain was named for Ellen Douglas, the heroine in Sir Walter Scott's poem The Lady of the Lake published in 1810.

== Drainage basin ==
Mount Ellen stands within the watershed of Lake Champlain, which drains into the Richelieu River in Quebec, the Saint Lawrence River, and then eventually into the Gulf of Saint Lawrence. On the east side of the ridge, Mount Ellen drains into Mill Brook, thence into the Mad River, the Winooski River, and into Lake Champlain. On the west side of the ridge, Mount Ellen drains into the New Haven River, thence into Otter Creek, and into Lake Champlain.

== Hiking ==
The Long Trail traverses the summit of Mount Ellen midway between Lincoln Gap and Appalachian Gap. The closest side trail is the Jerusalem Trail, whose trailhead is in Starksboro, Vermont. The trail terminates at the Long Trail after 2.4 miles (3.9 km). From the intersection, Mount Ellen is 1.8 miles (2.9 km) south on the Long Trail while Glen Ellen Shelter is 0.4 miles (0.6 km) to the east and Stark's Nest is 1.0 mile (1.6 km) to the north.

== Skiing ==
Part of Mount Ellen's eastern face is used for the ski trails of Sugarbush Resort.

== See also ==
- List of New England Fifty Finest
- List of New England Hundred Highest
