= Stark Mountain =

Mountain in Vermont, U.S.

- General Stark Mountain
- Location within Vermont

Highest point
- Elevation: 3,662 ft (1,116 m)
- Prominence: 222 ft (68 m)
- Isolation: 1.32 mi (2.12 km)
- Listing: Mountains of Vermont
- Coordinates: 44°11′03″N 072°55′44″W

Geography
- Country: United States
- State: Vermont
- County: Washington
- Town: Fayston
- Parent range: Green Mountains
- Topo map: USGS Mount Ellen 1:24,000

Stark Mountain (also known as General Stark Mountain) is a mountain in the Green Mountains in the U.S. state of Vermont. Located in the town of Fayston in Washington County, the mountain summit is 3,662 feet (1,116 m) in elevation. Stark Mountain is named after General John Stark, hero of the Battle of Bennington fought in 1777.

== Drainage basin ==
Stark Mountain stands within the watershed of Lake Champlain, which drains into the Richelieu River in Québec, the Saint Lawrence River, and then eventually into the Gulf of Saint Lawrence. On the east side of the ridge, Stark Mountain drains into Mill Brook, thence into the Mad River, the Winooski River, and into Lake Champlain. On the west side of the ridge, Stark Mountain drains into the Huntington River and into the Winooski River.

== Hiking ==
The Long Trail traverses the summit of Stark Mountain, approximately 2.2 miles (3.5 km) north of Mount Ellen. The closest side trail providing access to this section of the Long Trail is the Jerusalem Trail in Starksboro, Vermont, which is also named after John Stark.

Just east of Camel's Hump State Forest in Starksboro, on the north peak of Stark Mountain at 3,644 feet (1,111 m), sits Stark's Nest, a warming hut for winter skiers at the Mad River Glen ski area. In the summer, the hut becomes an overnight lodge for hikers. The hike from Appalachian Gap to Stark's Nest via the Long Trail is 2.5 miles (4.0 km) with 1,267 feet (386 m) of vertical gain. Likewise it is 2.5 miles (4.0 km) from the base of the Mad River Glen ski area to Stark's Nest via the Stark Mountain Trail but with 2,036 feet (621 m) of vertical gain.

== See also ==
- List of mountains in Vermont
- Molly Stark
