= Camel's Hump State Park =

State park in Vermont, US

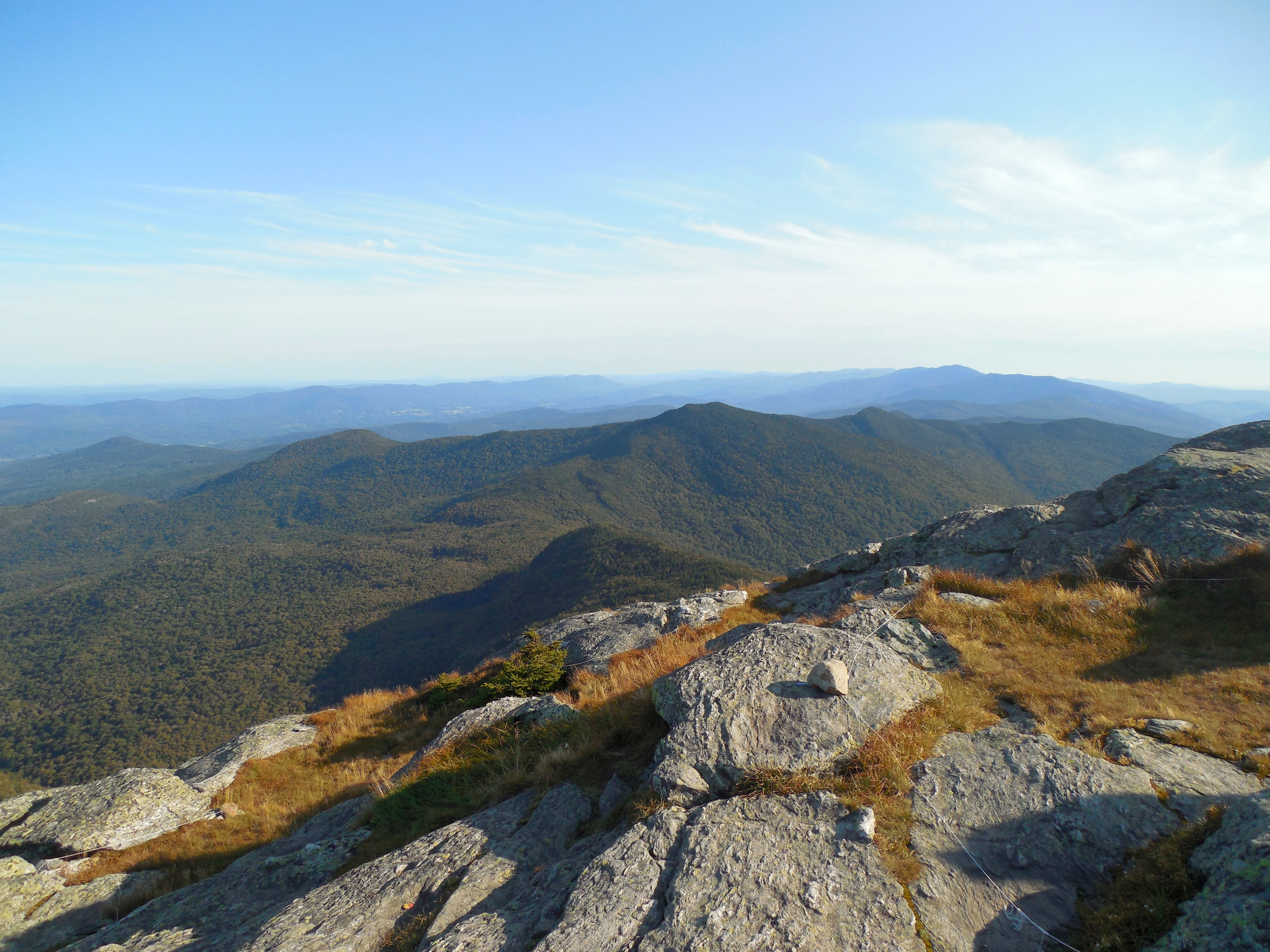
- View from the summit of Camel's Hump looking southward.

- Location within Vermont
- Interactive map of Camel's Hump State Park
- Location: Vermont, United States
- Nearest city: Burlington, Vermont
- Coordinates: 44°19′11″N 72°53′11″W
- Area: 21,224 acres (8,589 ha)
- Established: 1969
- Administrator: Vermont Department of Forests, Parks, and Recreation
- Open: All year
- Website: Official website
- Vermont State Parks

Camel's Hump State Park is a state park in the U.S. state of Vermont. The park straddles the northern Green Mountains in an area bounded by Vermont Route 17 on the south and the Winooski River on the north. As of 2017, the park covered a total of 21,224 acres (8,589 ha), making it the largest state park in Vermont.

The primary natural feature in the park is Camel's Hump, the third highest mountain in Vermont at 4,085 feet (1,245 m). The summit of Camel's Hump, which is surrounded by 10 acres (4.0 ha) of alpine tundra, is the focal point of Camel's Hump Natural Area, a 7,850-acre (3,180 ha) protected area in the heart of Camel's Hump State Park.

== Public access ==
Camel's Hump State Park has no phone, no visitor facilities, and no entry fee. The park is publicly accessible from numerous undeveloped parking lots and trails. The most popular access points are the Burrows Trailhead east of Huntington and the Monroe Trailhead south of Duxbury. In 2016, almost 26,000 visitors signed the trail registers at these two trailheads. Parking is also available along Vermont Route 17 at Appalachian Gap in Buels Gore and along Duxbury Road west of Duxbury, but these parking areas are much further from Camel's Hump and therefore less popular.

At the Monroe Trailhead, the Camel's Hump View Trail is a 0.8-mile (1.3 km) universally accessible trail with easy grades, a wide path, and several benches along the way. From the trail, there is a view of Camel's Hump to the west.

== Trails ==
The Long Trail, a 273-mile (439 km) hiking trail running the length of Vermont, enters the southern edge of the park at Appalachian Gap along Vermont Route 17, winding northward 21 miles (34 km) along the ridge of the Green Mountains before reaching a footbridge that crosses the Winooski River on the park's northern boundary. This section of the Long Trail traverses the summit of Camel's Hump and other significant features:

Distance northbound		Feature	Approximate altitude		Distance southbound	
miles	km	Feature	feet	m	miles	km
21.0	33.8	Winooski River Footbridge	315	96	0.0	0.0
18.7	30.1	Parking lot on Duxbury Road	400	120	2.3	3.7
18.1	29.1	Gleason Brook Bridge	580	180	2.9	4.7
16.0	25.7	Spur to Bamforth Ridge Shelter	1,970	600	5.0	8.0
13.6	21.9	Junction: Alpine Trail	2,930	890	7.4	11.9
13.2	21.2	Gorham Spring	3,400	1,000	7.8	12.6
12.8	20.6	Hut Clearing; Junction: Burrows Trail; Junction: Monroe Trail	3,800	1,200	8.2	13.2
12.5	20.1	Camel's Hump	4,083	1,244	8.5	13.7
12.3	19.8	Junction: Alpine Trail	3,800	1,200	8.7	14.0
10.8	17.4	Wind Gap; Junction: Allis Trail; Junction: Dean Trail	2,800	850	10.2	16.4
10.6	17.1	Montclair Glen Lodge; Junction: Forest City Trail	2,670	810	10.4	16.7
10.4	16.7	Junction: Allis Trail	2,890	880	10.6	17.1
9.6	15.4	Mount Ethan Allen	3,688	1,124	11.4	18.3
8.5	13.7	Mount Ira Allen (east slope)	3,460	1,050	12.5	20.1
7.0	11.3	Burnt Rock Mountain	3,168	966	14.0	22.5
6.4	10.3	Junction: Hedgehog Brook Trail	2,800	850	14.6	23.5
5.5	8.9	Cowles Cove Shelter	2,520	770	15.5	24.9
4.1	6.6	Huntington Gap	2,217	676	16.9	27.2
2.6	4.2	Birch Glen Camp; Junction: Beane Trail	2,020	620	18.4	29.6
1.3	2.1	Molly Stark's Balcony	2,900	880	19.7	31.7
1.1	1.8	Molly Stark Mountain	2,967	904	19.9	32.0
0.3	0.5	Baby Stark Mountain	2,863	873	20.7	33.3
0.0	0.0	Appalachian Gap	2,377	725	21.0	33.8

The southbound trail from the parking lot on Duxbury Road over the Bamforth Ridge to the summit of Camel's Hump climbs 3,683 feet (1,123 m) in 6.2 miles (10.0 km), the largest vertical climb on the entire length of the Long Trail.

The Catamount Trail, a 300-mile (480 km) cross-country ski trail, enters the southeastern corner of the park along Vermont Route 17. It crosses the Long Trail at Huntington Gap approximately 4 miles (6.4 km) north of the park’s southern boundary, and then heads due north, skirting the western edge of the park’s lower elevations.

The Vermont Association of Snow Travelers (VAST) maintains three snowmobile trails within the park: VAST 17, which is 6 miles (9.7 km) long, south of Camel’s Hump; VAST 17A, which is 1.9 miles (3.1 km) long, south of Camel’s Hump; and VAST 100A, which is 7.5 miles (12.1 km) long, south and east of Camel’s Hump. VAST 17 intersects both the Long Trail and the Catamount Trail at Huntington Gap.

Phen Basin in the southeast corner of Camel's Hump State Park is a popular mountain biking destination. There are numerous trails in the area including the Chain Gang Trail and the East Loop Trail. Parking is available at the end of Bassett Hill Road and at the end of Stagecoach Road, both in Fayston.

== Camping ==
Camping in Camel's Hump State Park is limited. Additional camping facilities are available at nearby Little River State Park.

The Green Mountain Club operates two shelters (3-sided) and two lodges (4-sided) on the Long Trail (from south to north): Birch Glen Camp, Cowles Cove Shelter, Montclair Glen Lodge, and Bamforth Ridge Shelter. There is a nominal fee for overnight use of a shelter or lodge as well as a 2-night limit. Reservations are not accepted.

Each shelter and lodge has at least one wooden platform nearby for campers. The only dedicated tent camping area in the park is the Hump Brook Tenting Area with 30 tent sites. Overnight use of the latter requires a fee.

Primitive camping is allowed in Camel's Hump State Park below 2,500 feet (760 m), away from trails, roads, and water, in accordance with state primitive camping guidelines and Leave No Trace principles.

== History ==
During the late 1800s and early 1900s, the forests of Camel’s Hump State Park were extensively logged. Except for some remote pockets at the highest elevations, Camel’s Hump was almost completely denuded by the end of the nineteenth century. To make matters worse, a great fire burned thousands of acres in 1903, sparing some of the forests along the western flank of Camel’s Hump but burning almost everywhere else. Many of the trees that now cover the eastern flank of Camel’s Hump had their start in the aftermath of that fire.

About the same time, Joseph Battell, a publisher, environmentalist, and philanthropist from Middlebury, purchased over 30,000 acres (12,000 ha) of forest land in the Green Mountains. In particular, in 1891 he purchased Camel's Hump along with 1,147 acres (464 ha) of surrounding forest. In 1911, he sold these lands (for one dollar) to the State of Vermont. The deed declared:

...in consideration of the love I bear my native state, do give, grant, bargain, sell, convey and confirm to THE STATE OF VERMONT for a STATE PARK a mountain called CAMELS HUMP...Trees growing on the land herein conveyed are not to be cut except those which it is necessary to remove in building paths or roads, and the whole forest is to be preserved in a primeval state...

In accordance with Battell's wishes, in 1969 the Vermont legislature established Camel's Hump Forest Reserve and designated the state lands in the reserve as Camel's Hump State Park. An ecological area was created "to protect scarce and rare plants, to preserve the natural habitat, and to maintain the wilderness aspect" of the park. The ecological area includes the land conveyed by Battell in 1911.

== See also ==
- Camel's Hump State Forest

== Bibliography ==
- Alfieri, Amy; Chipman, Brian; Gobeille, John; Johnson, Michael; Leonard, Matthew; Nerenberg, Jason; Peterson, Robert; Sausville, David; Sabourin, Gary; Zaino, Robert (2017). "Camel's Hump Management Unit: Long Range Management Plan" (PDF). State of Vermont: Agency of Natural Resources; Department of Forests, Parks and Recreation; Fish and Wildlife Department.
- Alfieri, Amy; Bates, Karen; Gobeille, John; Johnson, Michael; Leonard, Matthew; Mikula, Toni; Nerenberg, Jason; Peterson, Robert; Sausville, David; Simard, Lee; Wrigley, Kathryn; Zaino, Robert; Baron, Bill; Chipman, Brian; Sabourin, Gary; Sawyer, Gary (October 2021). "Camel's Hump Management Unit: Long Range Management Plan" (PDF). State of Vermont, Agency of Natural Resources: Department of Forests, Parks and Recreation; Fish and Wildlife Department.
