= Camel's Hump State Forest =

State Forest in Chittenden, Washington, and Addison counties, Vermont

- Location within Vermont
- Interactive map of Camel's Hump State Forest

Geography
- Location: Chittenden, Addison, and Washington Counties, Vermont, United States
- Coordinates: 44.1977°N 72.9492°W
- Area: 2,323 acres (9.40 km^{2})

Administration
- Status: State forest
- Established: 1986
- Authority: Vermont Department of Forests, Parks and Recreation
- Website: fpr.vermont.gov/camels-hump-state-forest

Ecology
- Lesser flora: Eastern Jacob's ladder (Polemonium vanbruntiae)

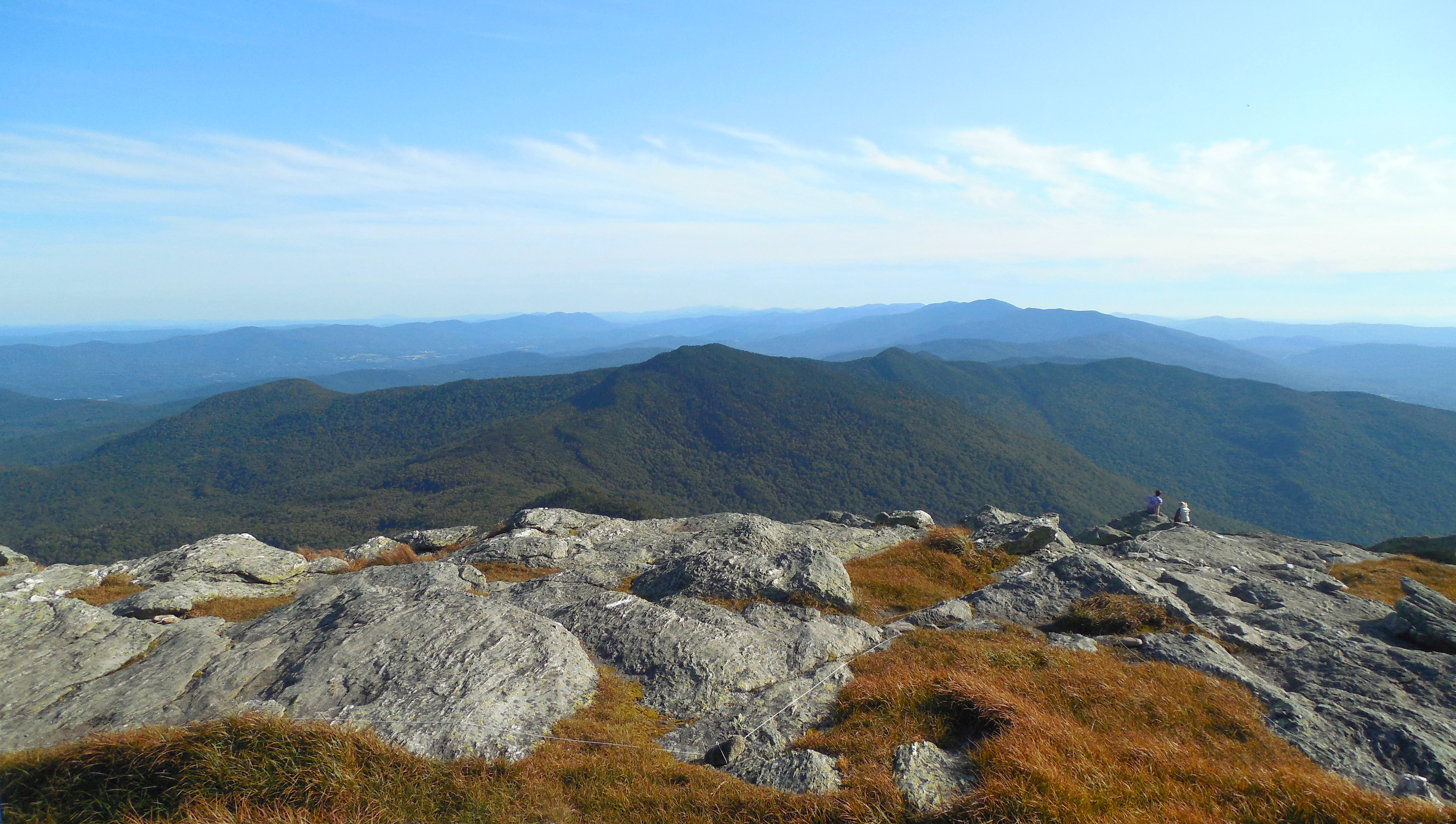
View from the summit of Camel's Hump Mountain

Camel's Hump State Forest (alternatively Camels Hump State Forest) covers a total of 2,323 acres (9.40 km^{2}) in two blocks in the U.S. state of Vermont. Stevens Block comprises 1,680 acres (6.8 km^{2}) in Buels Gore, Fayston, and Starksboro in Chittenden, Washington, and Addison counties, respectively. Howe Block covers 643 acres (2.60 km^{2}) in Waitsfield and Fayston, both in Washington county. The forest is managed by the Vermont Department of Forests, Parks and Recreation.

== Description ==
The Stevens Block of Camel's Hump State Forest is managed for wildlife habitat and timber resources. The Long Trail skirts the eastern edge of this block of the forest. Parking is available at Appalachian Gap on Vermont Route 17.

The Howe Block of Camel's Hump State Forest is a popular mountain biking destination. There are numerous trails in the area including Busternut Trail, Clinic Trail, Cyclone Trail, and Enchanted Forest Trail. Parking is available at either end of Tucker Hill Road in Fayston.

== See also ==
- Camel's Hump
- Camel's Hump Forest Reserve
- Camel's Hump State Park

== Bibliography ==
- Alfieri, Amy; Chipman, Brian; Gobeille, John; Johnson, Michael; Leonard, Matthew; Nerenberg, Jason; Peterson, Robert; Sausville, David; Sabourin, Gary; Zaino, Robert (2017). "Camel's Hump Management Unit: Long Range Management Plan" (PDF). State of Vermont: Agency of Natural Resources; Department of Forests, Parks and Recreation; Fish and Wildlife Department.
- Alfieri, Amy; Bates, Karen; Gobeille, John; Johnson, Michael; Leonard, Matthew; Mikula, Toni; Nerenberg, Jason; Peterson, Robert; Sausville, David; Simard, Lee; Wrigley, Kathryn; Zaino, Robert; Baron, Bill; Chipman, Brian; Sabourin, Gary; Sawyer, Gary (October 2021). "Camel's Hump Management Unit: Long Range Management Plan" (PDF). State of Vermont, Agency of Natural Resources: Department of Forests, Parks and Recreation; Fish and Wildlife Department.
