= Camel's Hump =

Mountain in Vermont, US

- Moziozagan
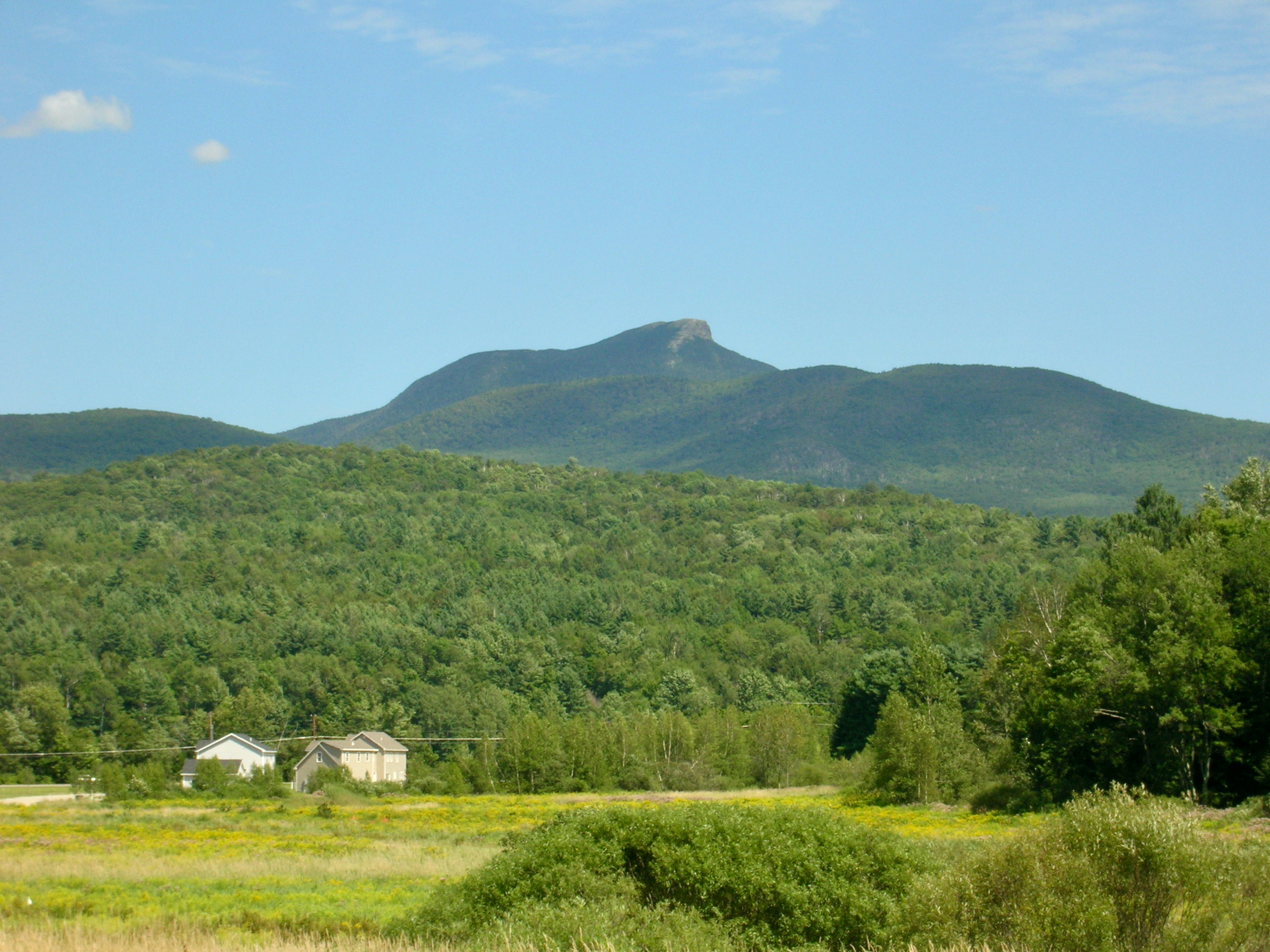
- Camel's Hump, July 2006

Highest point
- Elevation: 4,083 ft (1,244 m)
- Prominence: 1,860 ft (570 m)
- Listing: New England 4,000-footers New England Fifty Finest #46
- Coordinates: 44°19′11″N 72°53′10″W

Geography
- Location within Vermont
- Country: United States
- State: Vermont
- County: Chittenden / Washington
- Town: Huntington / Duxbury
- Parent range: Green Mountains

Geology
- Rock age: 550 million years

Climbing
- Easiest route: Hiking trail

U.S. National Natural Landmark
- Designated: 1968

Camel's Hump (alternatively Camels Hump) is a mountain in the Green Mountains in the U.S. state of Vermont. The north slope of the mountain borders the Winooski River, which has carved through the Green Mountains over eons. At 4,083 ft (1,244 m), it is tied with Mount Ellen for the third-highest mountain in Vermont. Surmounted by 10 acres (4 ha) of alpine tundra, the mountain is the most significant feature in Camel's Hump State Park. Because of its distinctive profile, it is perhaps the state's most recognized mountain, featured on the state quarter.

== Name ==
The Abenaki were the first to note this mountain's distinctive shape, calling it Moziozagan (Western Abnaki pronunciation: [mʊziʊzɑgɑn]), meaning moose's shoulder. Subsequent European names continued this pattern: in 1609, Samuel de Champlain named the mountain "Le Lion Couchant", a heraldic description which roughly translates as "The Resting Lion". Ira Allen later referred to the mountain as "Camel's Rump" on a map from 1798. It was not until 1830 that the name "Camel's Hump" came into usage.

The Geographic Names Information System (GNIS) lists twelve variant names including Tah-wak-be-dee-ee-so wadso and Catamountain. While place names are determined by local usage the U.S. Board on Geographic Names (BGN) serves as a central authority in the United States concerning place names. Since its inception in 1890 the BGN has discouraged the use of the genitive apostrophe. Local usage is often at odds with this policy and so the name of this mountain is alternatively spelled with and without an apostrophe.

== Geology ==
Camel's Hump is more notable for its shape than its height. Isolated from neighboring peaks by the Winooski Valley and glacial action, the mountain's conical silhouette is distinctive, if misleading. It has two "humps", with the southernmost being the higher, and a steep drop to the south as a result of a quarrying action of the ice passing over it. The movement of glacial ice shaped it into what is referred to as a roche moutonnée. The bedrock consists of phyllite, quartzite, and schist.

In 1968 the National Park Service designated Camel's Hump a National Natural Landmark, citing the peak as "an exceptional illustration of the complex anticlinal deformation which formed the Green Mountains". The landmark area consists of approximately 5,300 acres (2,100 ha) from the summit down to 2,500 ft (760 m).

== Climate ==
Climate data for Camel's Hump 44.3168 N, 72.8828 W, Elevation: 3,438 ft (1,048 m) (1991–2020 normals)
Month	Jan	Feb	Mar	Apr	May	Jun	Jul	Aug	Sep	Oct	Nov	Dec	Year
Mean daily maximum °F (°C)	19.0 (−7.2)	21.0 (−6.1)	28.6 (−1.9)	42.7 (5.9)	56.0 (13.3)	64.3 (17.9)	68.4 (20.2)	66.8 (19.3)	60.6 (15.9)	47.6 (8.7)	34.7 (1.5)	24.6 (−4.1)	44.5 (7.0)
Daily mean °F (°C)	11.1 (−11.6)	13.0 (−10.6)	21.0 (−6.1)	34.2 (1.2)	47.7 (8.7)	56.9 (13.8)	61.5 (16.4)	59.9 (15.5)	53.2 (11.8)	40.7 (4.8)	28.2 (−2.1)	17.8 (−7.9)	37.1 (2.8)
Mean daily minimum °F (°C)	3.2 (−16.0)	5.0 (−15.0)	13.3 (−10.4)	25.8 (−3.4)	39.5 (4.2)	49.4 (9.7)	54.5 (12.5)	53.0 (11.7)	45.8 (7.7)	33.8 (1.0)	21.7 (−5.7)	11.0 (−11.7)	29.7 (−1.3)
Average precipitation inches (mm)	4.77 (121)	4.34 (110)	5.21 (132)	5.49 (139)	5.93 (151)	6.77 (172)	6.74 (171)	6.33 (161)	5.70 (145)	6.83 (173)	5.62 (143)	5.94 (151)	69.67 (1,769)
Source: PRISM Climate Group

== Botany ==
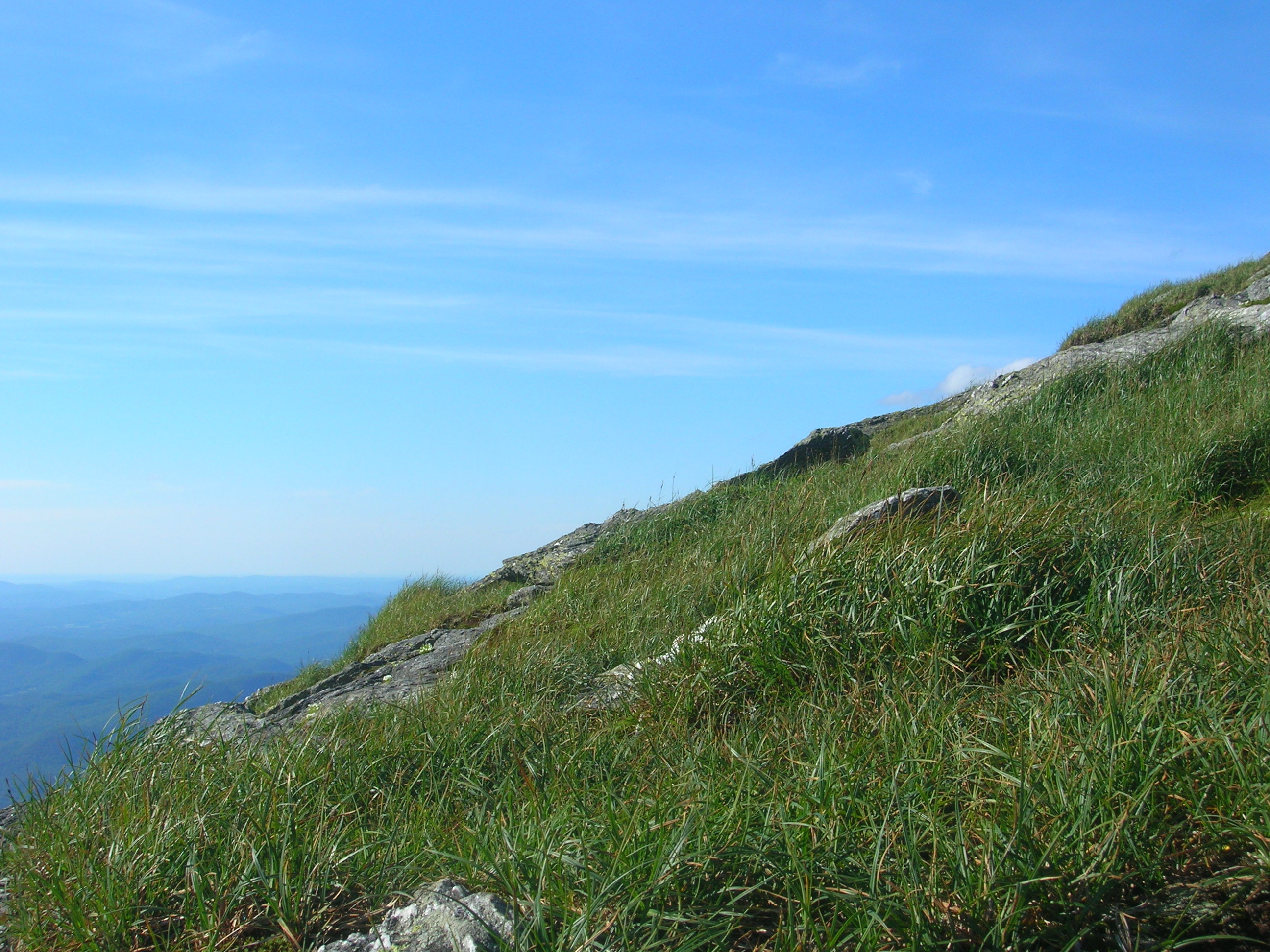
Alpine tundra grasses at the summit of Camel's Hump, Vermont, June 2008.

The summit of Camel's Hump is home to 10 acres (4 ha) of alpine tundra vegetation. Common plants found in this area include: Bigelow's sedge (Carex bigelowii), alpine bilberry (Vaccinium uliginosum), mountain sandwort (Minuartia groenlandica), crowberry (Empetrum nigrum), mountain cranberry (Vaccinium vitis-idaea), and Labrador tea (Rhododendron groenlandicum). A direct result of glacial formation, these alpine species were once widespread but as the lower elevations warmed, only the very peak of Camel's Hump remained hospitable to the fragile plants.

There are 18 species of plants at or near the summit of Camel's Hump that are thought to be rare or very rare. Of these, five species are protected by the Vermont endangered and threatened species rule: Boott's rattlesnake-root (Nabalus boottii, generically known as white lettuce), bearberry willow (Salix uva-ursi), lesser wintergreen (Pyrola minor), alpine sweetgrass (Anthoxanthum monticola), and squashberry (Viburnum edule). The Green Mountain Club's Summit Caretaker program actively promotes Leave No Trace principles and helps to protect the alpine tundra natural community on the summit of Camel's Hump.

Despite extensive logging during the late 1800s and a great fire in 1903, Camel's Hump continues to support a significant population of red spruce (Picea rubens). Starting in the 1960s, Hub Vogelmann and his graduate students from the University of Vermont observed an extensive decline in the red spruce population on the west slope of Camel's Hump. Vogelmann's 1982 landmark paper “Catastrophe on Camel’s Hump” identified the cause of the decline to be acid rain. Similarly the Forest Decline Project at the University of Vermont published a study in 1991 that again cited acid rain as the culprit. These findings raised public awareness and eventually led to a revision of the Clean Air Act. By 2017, with mounting evidence that the health of red spruce was on the rise, the scourge of acid rain in the northeast had largely come to an end.

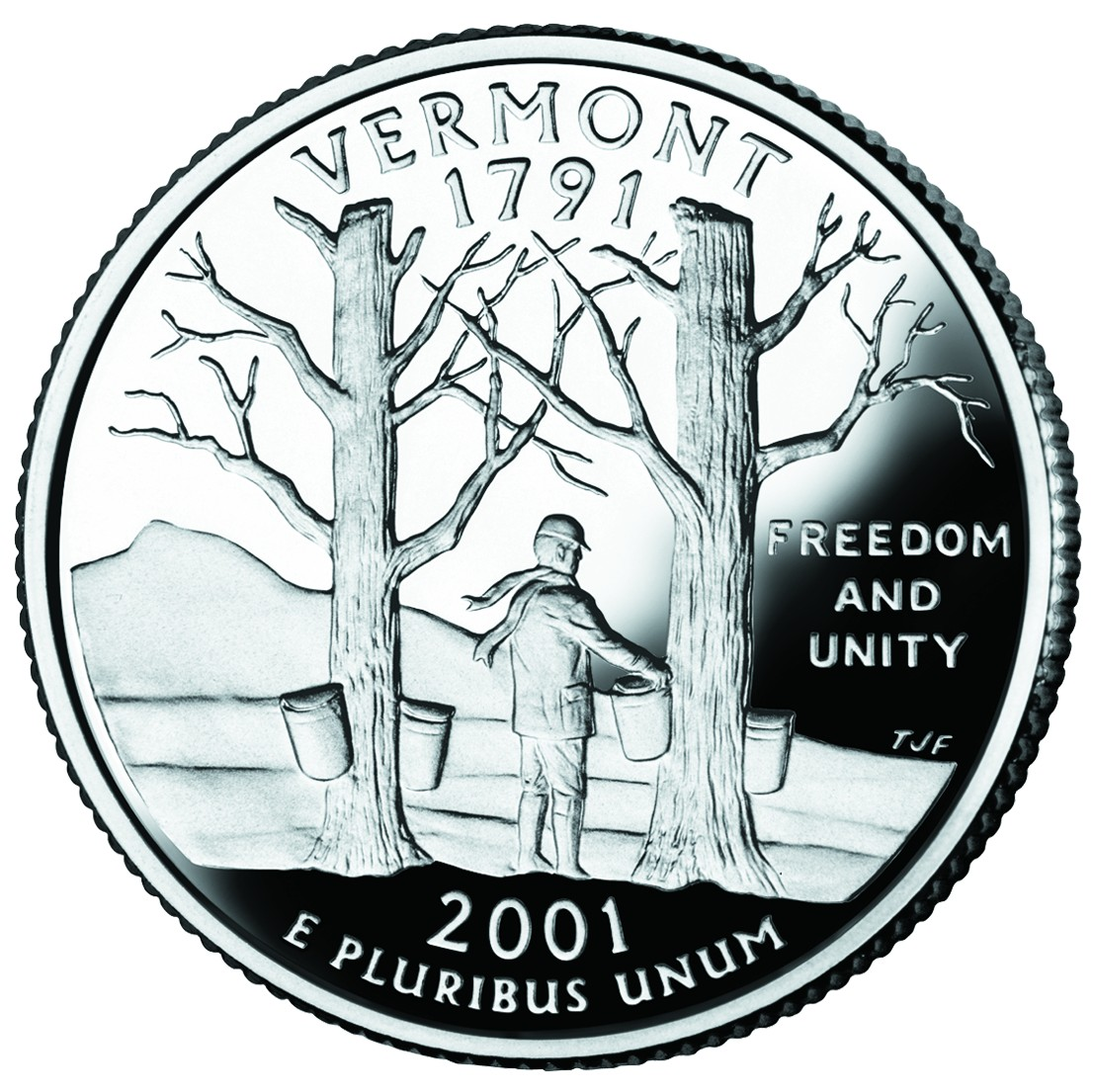
The Vermont state quarter depicts Camel's Hump and Maple trees with sap buckets

== History ==
One of the Abenaki names for the mountain is Tawabodiiwajo (lit. 'saddle-mountain, mountain-seat', Western Abnaki pronunciation: [tɑwɑbʊdi.iwɑd͡zʊ]), variously recorded as "ta wak be dee esso wadso," or "tahwahbodeay wadso", which has been variously translated as "resting place", "sit-down place", and "prudently, we make a campfire in a circle near water (and rest) at this mountain." However, more recently the mountain has occasionally been called Kokkwibeskwanes (lit. 'hump-backed one', Western Abnaki pronunciation: [kʊk.kʷibeskʷɑnes]), a direct calque of the English name in the way that this word is also used to refer to camels in general.

In 1905, publisher and philanthropist Joseph Battell donated 1,200 acres (4.9 km^{2}) of virgin forest, including the summit of Camel's Hump, to the State of Vermont. The bequest was intended to form a state park to be kept in a "primitive state" and in 1911 the state forester was given charge of the area who managed the land in accordance with Battell's wishes. Since then, Vermont has adopted new legislation to preserve its natural areas and in 1969 created a Forest Reserve enclosing the mountain. Camel's Hump State Park has grown since the original bequest and in 1991 totalled approximately 20,000 acres (81 km^{2}).

In October 1944, during World War II, a B-24J bomber on a training mission crashed into the side of the mountain near the summit. While most of the plane was salvaged and removed, portions of the wreckage (principally a wing section) still remain. The Alpine Trail passes by the site.

Though protected, the Camel's Hump area is a favorite recreational venue for hikers. Trail work began on Camel's Hump at the formation of the Green Mountain Club (GMC) and by 1912, a trail had been constructed between the mountain and Sterling Pond. This initial trail would later become a high point in the "footpath in the wilderness" known as the Long Trail. In the 1950s, the GMC constructed shelters along the trail and at the summit. The GMC now trains and pays a caretaker to reside near the summit during the summer and educate hikers to respect the fragile alpine ecosystem that exists on the mountain.

In 1999, an image of Camel's Hump was chosen as a prominent feature for the Vermont state quarter. While many other options were considered, including covered bridges and the snowflake photographs of Wilson Bentley, the seven-person panel ultimately decided on Camel's Hump stating that it was "perfect for the quarter." The panel's findings explained the choice: "It's wild and natural, like the Vermont countryside. It's unique and asymmetrical, like the independent and quirky reputation Vermonters have." Many notable Vermont institutions have adopted its memorable name, including the children's radio show "Camel's Hump Radio" hosted by Bill Harley on Vermont Public Radio. The profile of Camel's Hump appears in the Vermont coat of arms on the Vermont flag.

== Hiking ==
Summit marker on Camel's Hump. Notice the inscription reads "Camels Rump"

"With the only undeveloped alpine area in the Green Mountain State and a skyline that sets it apart from everything else, Camel's Hump may be Vermont's finest peak," says Michael Lanza in his guidebook for New England hiking enthusiasts. The views from the summit are panoramic, and on a clear day one can see the highest peaks of the following states: Mount Marcy in New York, Mount Washington in New Hampshire, as well as Vermont's Mount Mansfield.

The most popular access points for hikers are the Burrows Trailhead east of Huntington and the Monroe Trailhead south of Duxbury. In 2016, almost 26,000 visitors signed the trail registers at these two trailheads. Parking is also available along Duxbury Road west of Duxbury, but this parking area is much further from Camel's Hump.

There are multiple trails in the vicinity of Camel's Hump. The Long Trail traverses the summit of Camel's Hump on a north–south path. The Burrows Trail (from the west) and the Monroe Trail (from the east) intersect the Long Trail at the Hut Clearing just north of the Camel's Hump summit.

=== From the Burrows Trailhead ===
The Burrows Trailhead (1,800 ft or 550 m) is at the end of Camel's Hump Road east of Huntington. The vertical rise from the trailhead to the summit is 2,283 ft (696 m).

Camel's Hump via the Burrows Trail. The Burrows Trail ascends the west face of Camel's Hump. The trail intersects the Long Trail at the Hut Clearing after 2.1 mi (3.4 km). From the intersection, the summit is 0.3 mi (0.5 km) south on the Long Trail. One-way trip length: 2.4 mi (3.9 km). This is the shortest (and steepest) hike to the summit of Camel's Hump.

The Burrows Trail, the oldest trail on Camel's Hump, travels through some of the oldest spruce-fir forest on the mountain, one of the few areas believed to have escaped the 1903 fire. The Burrows Trail is also used in the winter as a snowshoe and ski route.

Camel's Hump via the Forest City Trail. The Forest City Trail is 0.1 mi (0.2 km) from the Burrows Trailhead along a connector trail. The Forest City Trail intersects the Long Trail in 1.4 mi (2.3 km). From the intersection, the summit is 1.9 mi (3.1 km) north on the Long Trail. One-way trip length: 3.4 mi (5.5 km).

The Forest City Trail follows an old logging road used by the Forest City Lumber Company to log much of the western side of the mountain in the late 1800s and early 1900s. The trail terminates at the Long Trail, not far from Montclair Glen Lodge, which was built by the Green Mountain Club in 1948.

=== From the Monroe Trailhead ===
The Monroe Trailhead (1,500 ft or 460 m) is at the end of Camel's Hump Road south of Duxbury. The vertical rise from the trailhead to the summit is 2,583 ft (787 m).

Camel's Hump via the Monroe Trail. The Monroe Trail ascends the east face of Camel's Hump. The trail intersects the Long Trail at the Hut Clearing after 3.1 mi (5.0 km). From the intersection, the summit is 0.3 mi (0.5 km) south on the Long Trail. One-way trip length: 3.4 mi (5.5 km).

The Monroe Trail was built in 1912. It is named for Will Monroe, who cut the Long Trail from Camel's Hump south to Middlebury Gap beginning in 1916. The Monroe Trail climbs through an extensive grove of paper birch that dates from the 1903 fire.

Camel's Hump via the Dean Trail. The Dean Trail is 1.3 mi (2.1 km) from the Monroe Trailhead. The trail intersects the Long Trail in 1.0 mi (1.6 km). From the intersection, the summit is 1.7 mi (2.7 km) north on the Long Trail. One-way trip length: 4.0 mi (6.4 km).

The Dean Trail crosses the Hump Brook Bridge 0.2 mi (0.3 km) from the Monroe Trail. At 0.3 mi (0.5 km), it reaches a spur trail to the Hump Brook Tenting Area, with tent platforms and campsites (available for a fee). At 0.7 mi (1.1 km) from the Monroe Trail, the Dean Trail overlooks a beaver pond with views of Camel's Hump.

Camel's Hump via the Alpine Trail. The Alpine Trail is 2.5 mi (4.0 km) from the Monroe Trailhead. The trail intersects the Long Trail in 0.5 mi (0.8 km). From the intersection, the summit is 0.2 mi (0.3 km) north on the Long Trail. One-way trip length: 3.2 mi (5.1 km).

The Alpine Trail traverses the site of a plane crash that occurred on Camel's Hump in October 1944. A B-24J Liberator bomber from Westover Air Force Base (now Westover Air Reserve Base) in Massachusetts struck the mountain just 100 ft (30 m) below the summit, scattering debris over the snow-covered peak. The collision killed nine crew members and left one survivor.

=== From Duxbury Road ===
From the parking lot on Duxbury Road, the Long Trail climbs south 2.7 mi (4.3 km) to a spur that leads 0.2 mi (0.3 km) east to the Bamforth Ridge Shelter. From there, it is 3.5 mi (5.6 km) south on the Long Trail to the summit. With a stop at the shelter, the one-way trip is 6.4 mi (10.3 km) with 3,683 ft (1,123 m) of elevation change. This is the longest climb on the entire Long Trail.

== Gallery ==
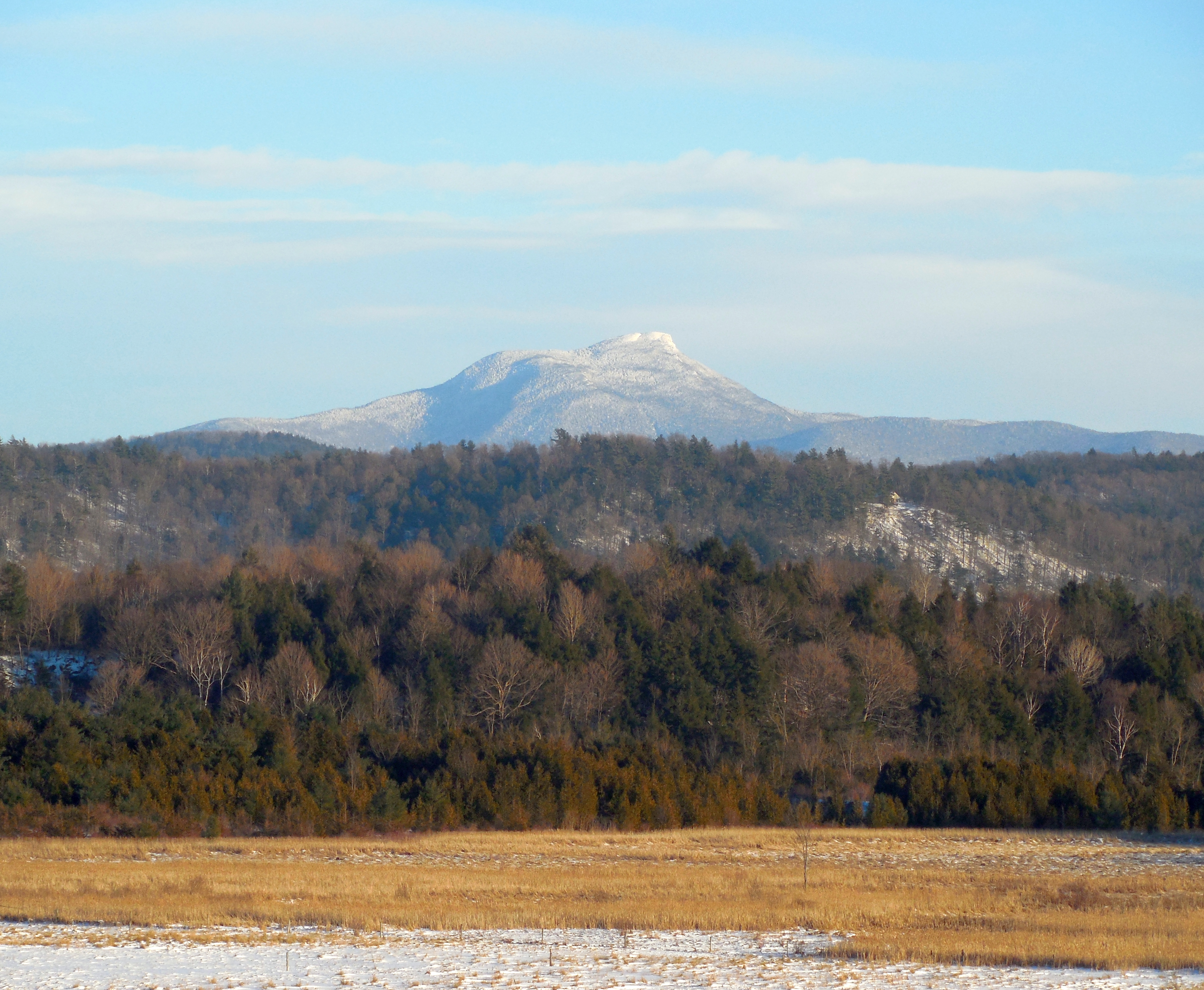
Western face of Camel's Hump Mountain from South Burlington, Vermont.

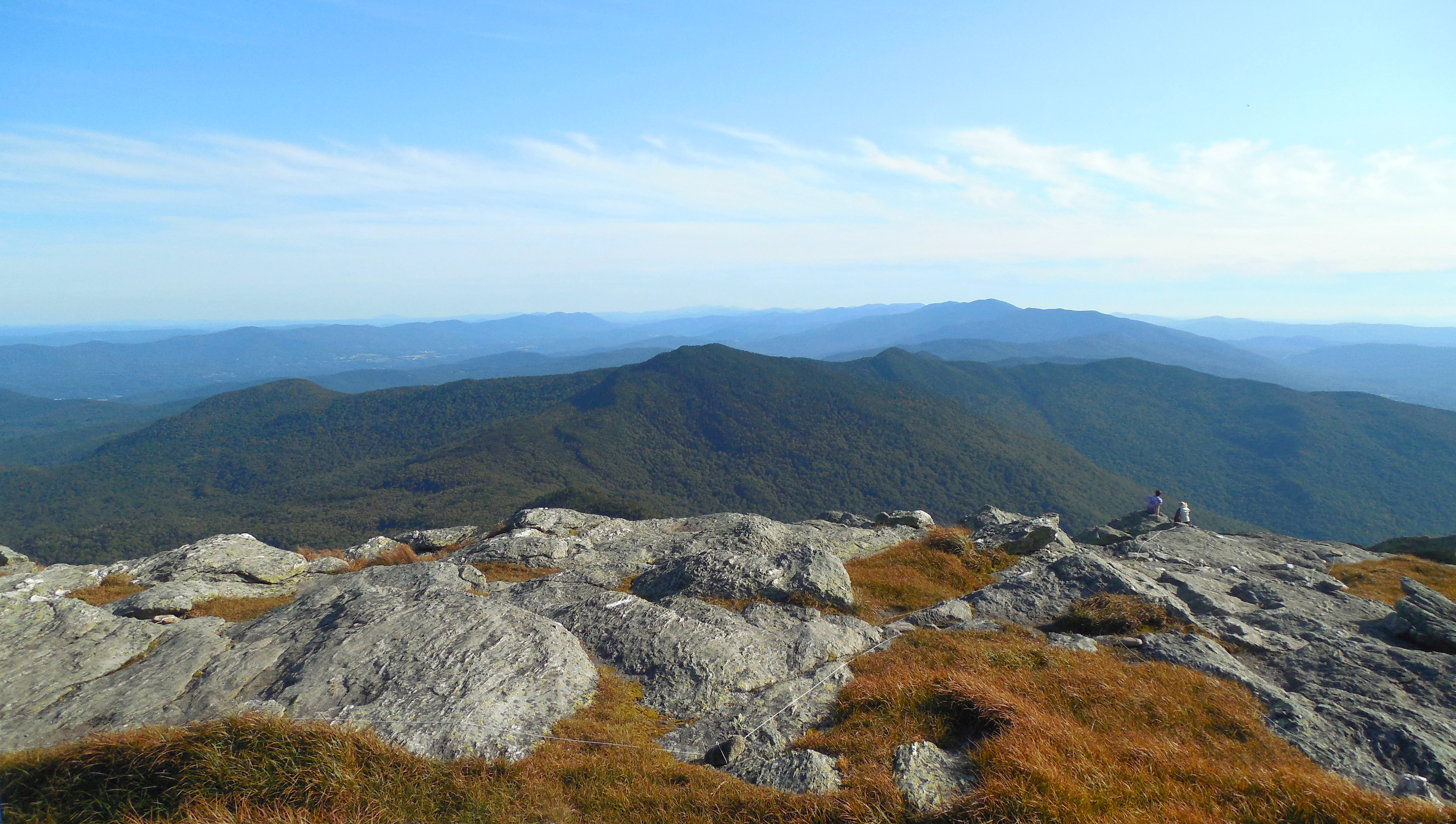
Southward view from the summit of Camel's Hump (with Mt. Ethan Allen in the immediate foreground), September 2017.

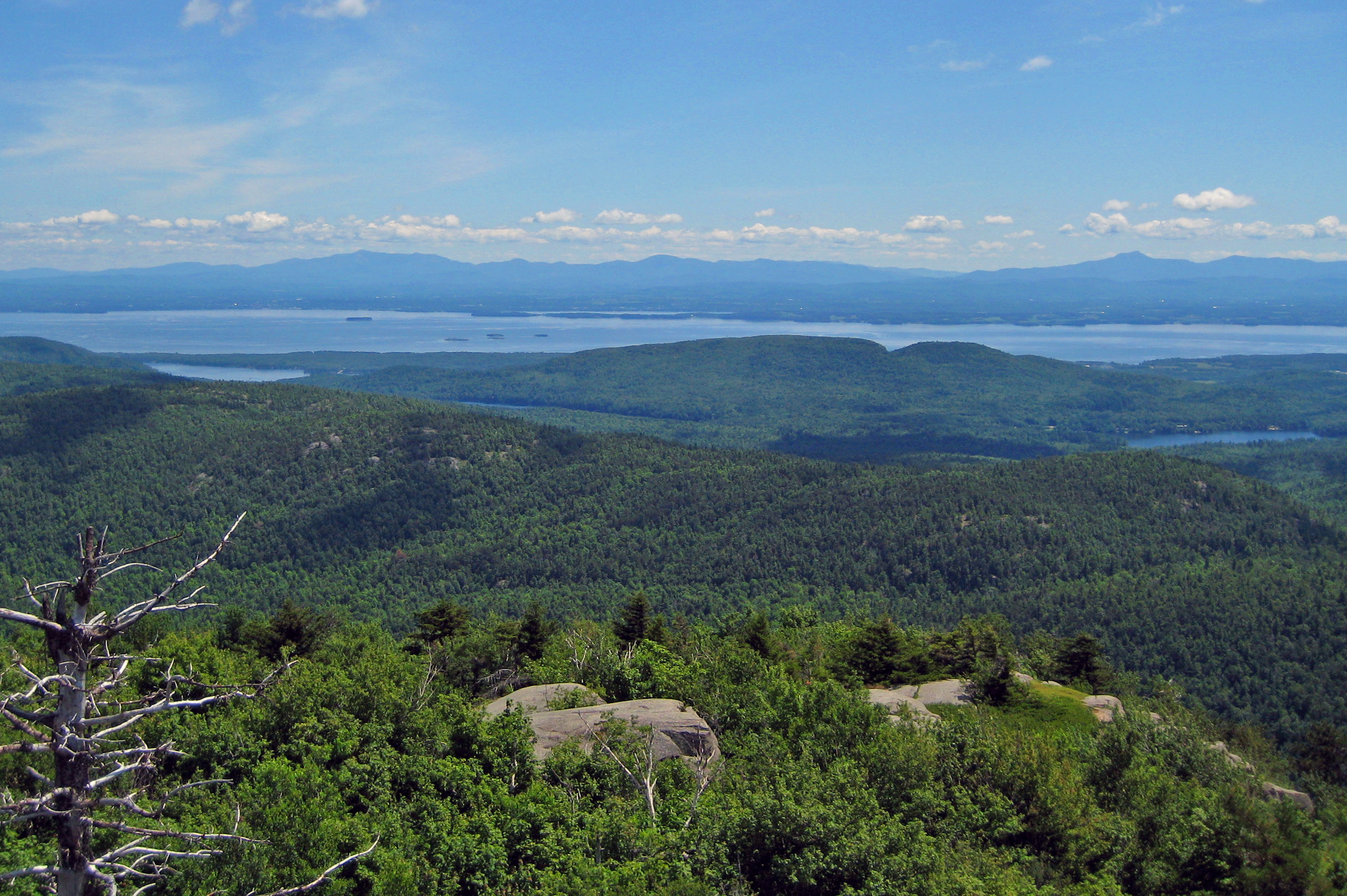
View east from old fire tower atop Poke-O-Moonshine Mountain in Chesterfield, NY: 2008

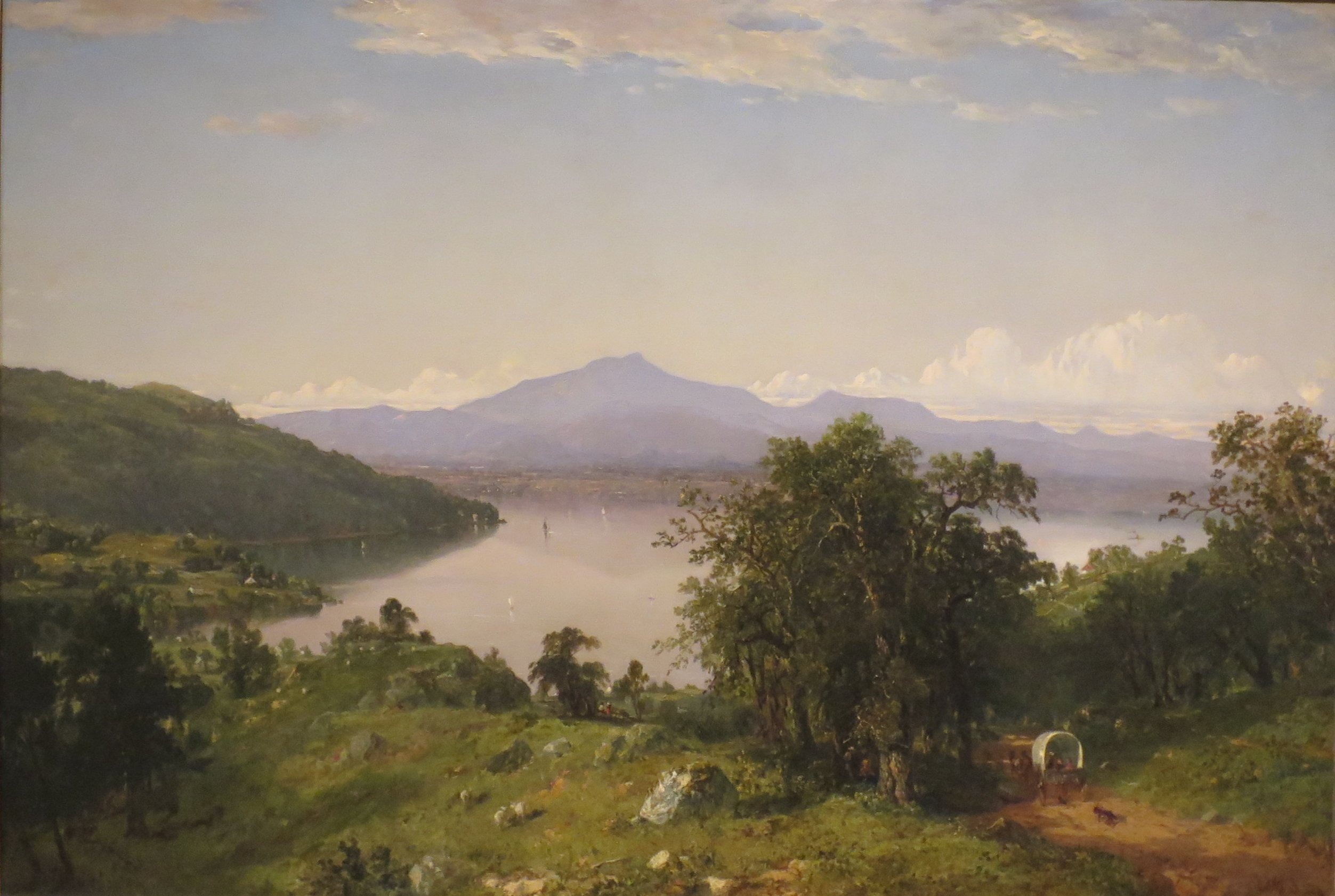
Painting of Camel's Hump by John Frederick Kensett, 1852, oil on canvas.

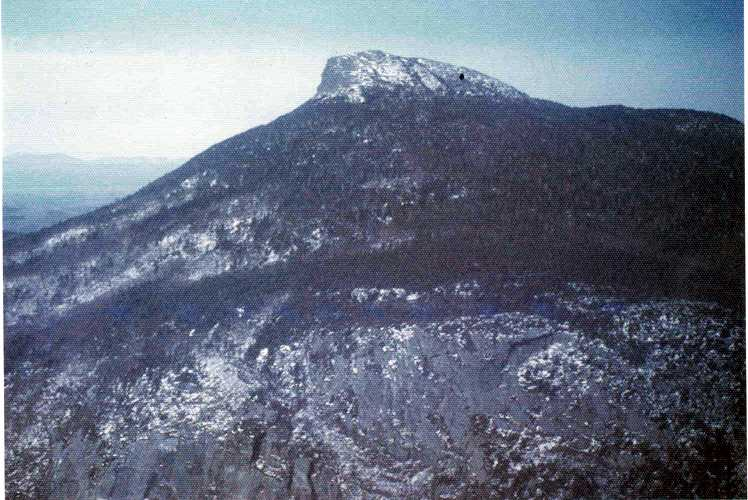
Eastern face of Camel's Hump taken in 1968

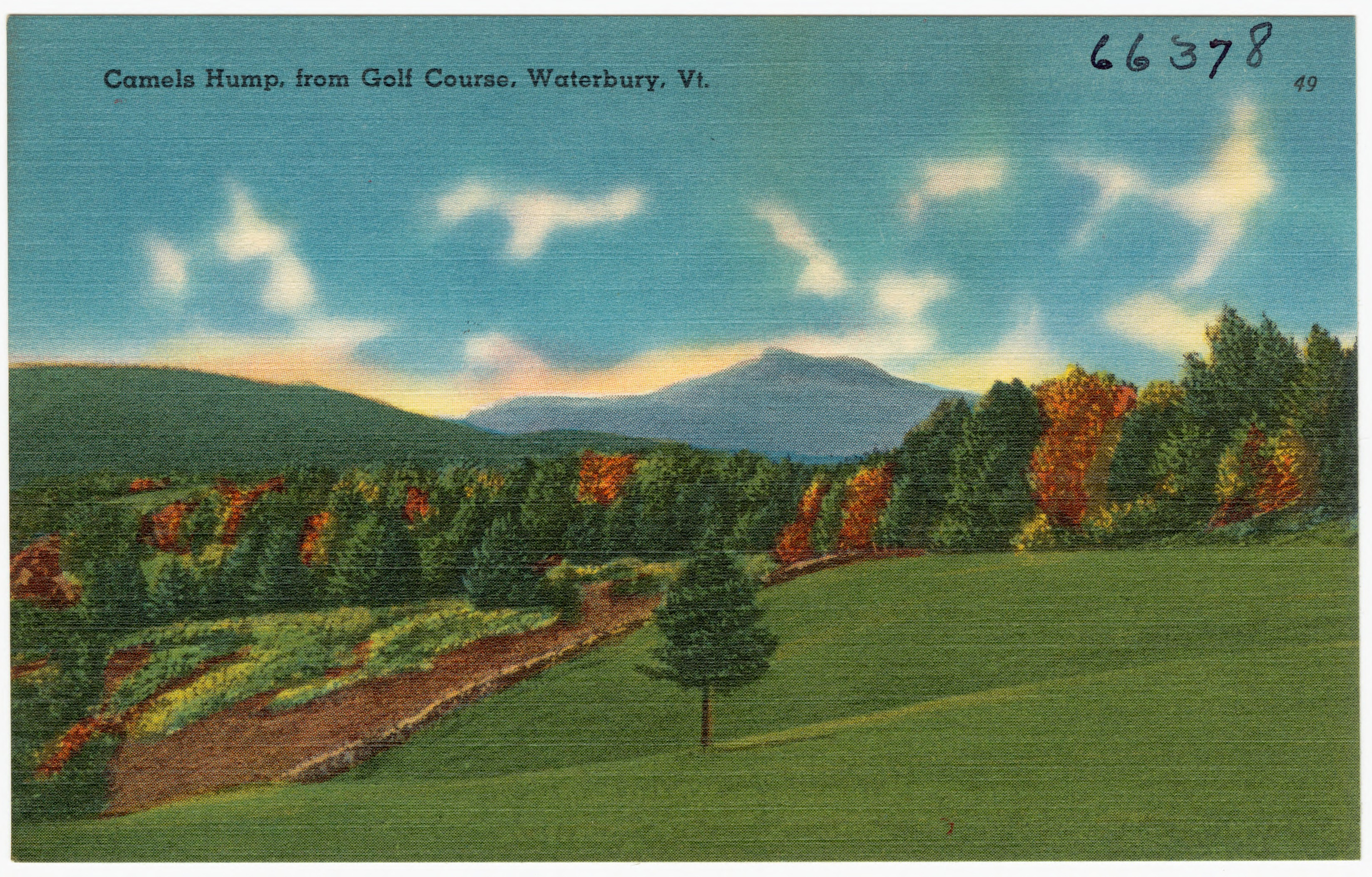
Postcard of eastern face of Camel's Hump

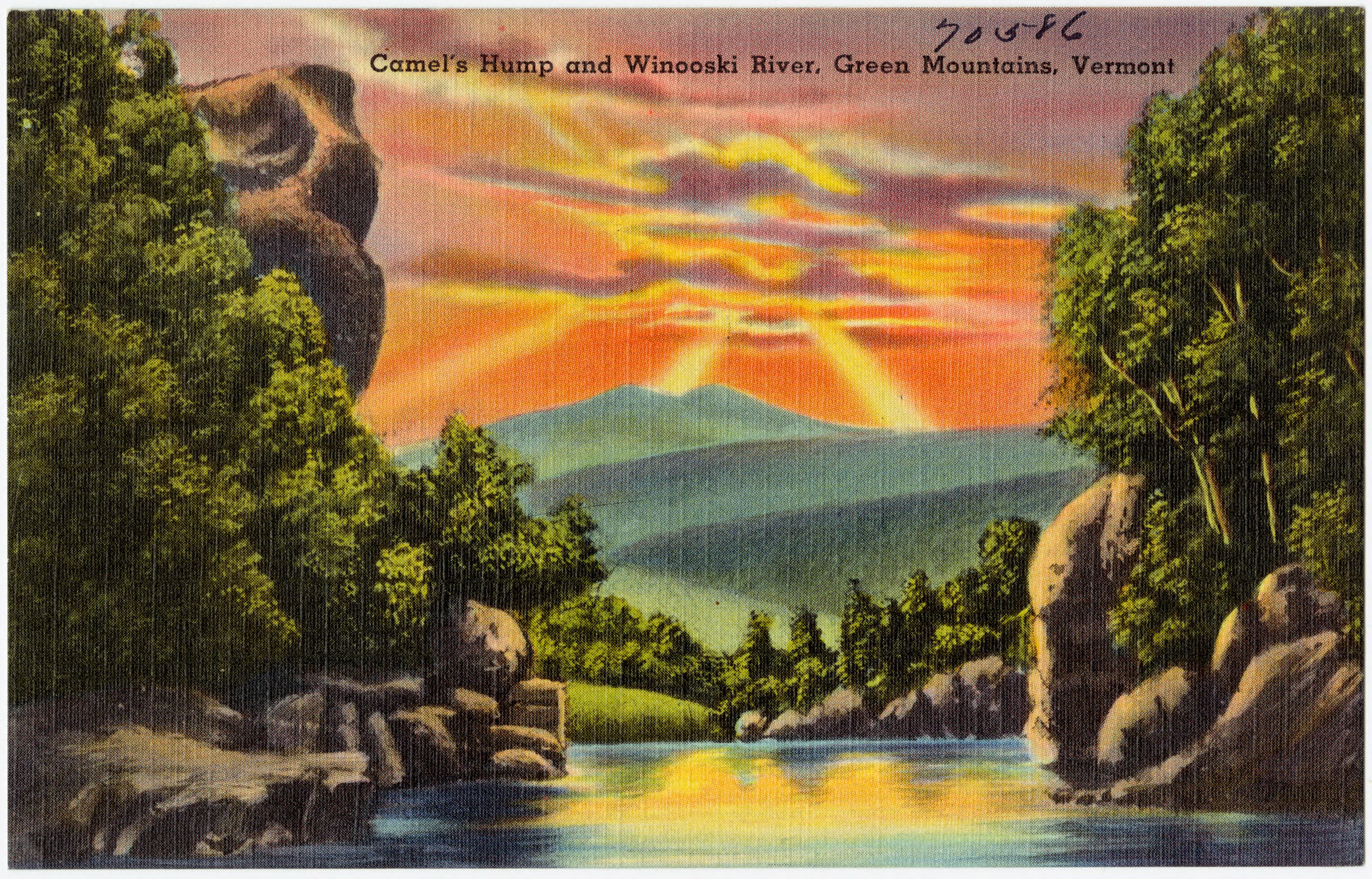
Postcard of western face of Camel's Hump

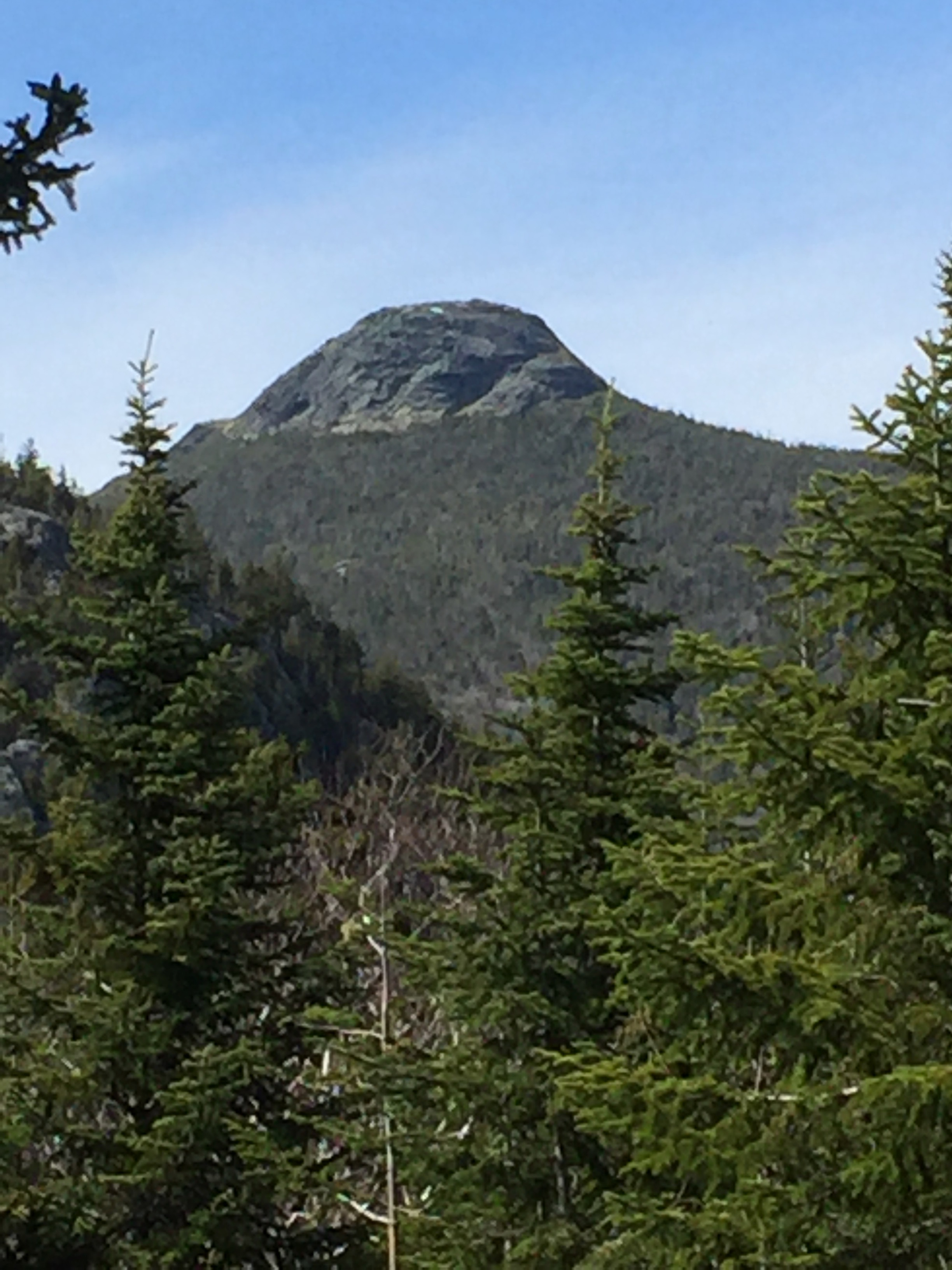
A view of Camel's Hump from the Allis Trail to the southeast

== See also ==
- List of New England Fifty Finest
- List of New England Hundred Highest
- Camel's Hump Natural Area
- Camel's Hump State Forest
- Mount Mansfield

== Bibliography ==
- Alfieri, Amy; Chipman, Brian; Gobeille, John; Johnson, Michael; Leonard, Matthew; Nerenberg, Jason; Peterson, Robert; Sausville, David; Sabourin, Gary; Zaino, Robert (2017). "Camel's Hump Management Unit: Long Range Management Plan" (PDF). State of Vermont: Agency of Natural Resources; Department of Forests, Parks and Recreation; Fish and Wildlife Department. Archived (PDF) from the original on September 25, 2020.
- Alfieri, Amy; Bates, Karen; Gobeille, John; Johnson, Michael; Leonard, Matthew; Mikula, Toni; Nerenberg, Jason; Peterson, Robert; Sausville, David; Simard, Lee; Wrigley, Kathryn; Zaino, Robert; Baron, Bill; Chipman, Brian; Sabourin, Gary; Sawyer, Gary (October 2021). "Camel's Hump Management Unit: Long Range Management Plan" (PDF). State of Vermont, Agency of Natural Resources: Department of Forests, Parks and Recreation; Fish and Wildlife Department.
- Johnson, Charles W. (1998). The Nature of Vermont: Introduction and Guide to a New England Environment. Hanover, NH: University Press of New England. ISBN 0-87451-856-3.
- Meeks, Harold A. (1986). Vermont's Land and Resources. The New England Press. ISBN 0-933050-40-2.
- Morrissey, Charles T. (1984). Vermont: A History. W. W. Norton and Co. ISBN 0-393-30223-7.
