= Paper birch (disambiguation) =

Paper birch is a common name for Betula papyrifera, a species of tree native to northern North America.

Paper birch may also refer to:

- Betula cordifolia, a species of tree native to eastern Canada and the northeastern United States
- Betula neoalaskana, a species of tree native to Alaska and northern Canada
