= Camel's Hump Forest Reserve =

Protected area in Vermont, United States

Coordinates: 44.3195615°N 72.8950828°W

Camel's Hump Forest Reserve is a protected area in the U.S. state of Vermont. The area is bounded by Vermont Route 17 on the south, the Winooski River on the north, the Mad River on the east, and the Huntington River on the west. The Forest Reserve covers a total of 127.68 square miles (330.7 km^{2}) or 81,715 acres (33,069 ha) of both public and privately owned land, one of the largest blocks of core forest in the state.

Camel's Hump Forest Reserve wholly contains Camel's Hump State Park, which is home to Camel's Hump, the third highest mountain in Vermont. Other state lands in the reserve include Huntington Gap Wildlife Management Area and Robbins Mountain Wildlife Management Area. Camel's Hump Forest Reserve should not be confused with Camel's Hump State Forest, a non-overlapping area south of Vermont Route 17.

== Origin ==
The Vermont legislature established Camel's Hump Forest Reserve in 1969. By statute, all public lands in the reserve are partitioned into three use districts:

1. Ecological area—all land above 2,500 feet (760 m) plus all land in the Gleason Brook watershed above 900 feet (270 m)
2. Timber management and wildlife area—all land between 1,800 feet (550 m) and 2,500 feet (760 m) except Gleason Brook
3. Multiple-use area—all land below 1,800 feet (550 m) except Gleason Brook

The ecological area was created "to protect scarce and rare plants, to preserve the natural habitat, and to maintain the wilderness aspect" of the land. The intended uses of the timber management and wildlife area include timber production, water conservation, wildlife management, hunting, hiking, cross-country skiing, and nature appreciation. Farming and residential living are permitted in the multiple-use area.

== Biodiversity ==
Citizen scientists have observed hundreds of different life forms in Camel's Hump Forest Reserve, including at least 300 species of animals and 250 species of plants. There are at least 10 species of animals and 24 species of plants in the vicinity of Camel's Hump thought to be rare or very rare. A handful of these are protected by Vermont state law.

== Bibliography ==
- Alfieri, Amy; Chipman, Brian; Gobeille, John; Johnson, Michael; Leonard, Matthew; Nerenberg, Jason; Peterson, Robert; Sausville, David; Sabourin, Gary; Zaino, Robert (2017). "Camel's Hump Management Unit: Long Range Management Plan" (PDF). State of Vermont: Agency of Natural Resources; Department of Forests, Parks and Recreation; Fish and Wildlife Department.
- Alfieri, Amy; Bates, Karen; Gobeille, John; Johnson, Michael; Leonard, Matthew; Mikula, Toni; Nerenberg, Jason; Peterson, Robert; Sausville, David; Simard, Lee; Wrigley, Kathryn; Zaino, Robert; Baron, Bill; Chipman, Brian; Sabourin, Gary; Sawyer, Gary (October 2021). "Camel's Hump Management Unit: Long Range Management Plan" (PDF). State of Vermont, Agency of Natural Resources: Department of Forests, Parks and Recreation; Fish and Wildlife Department.
