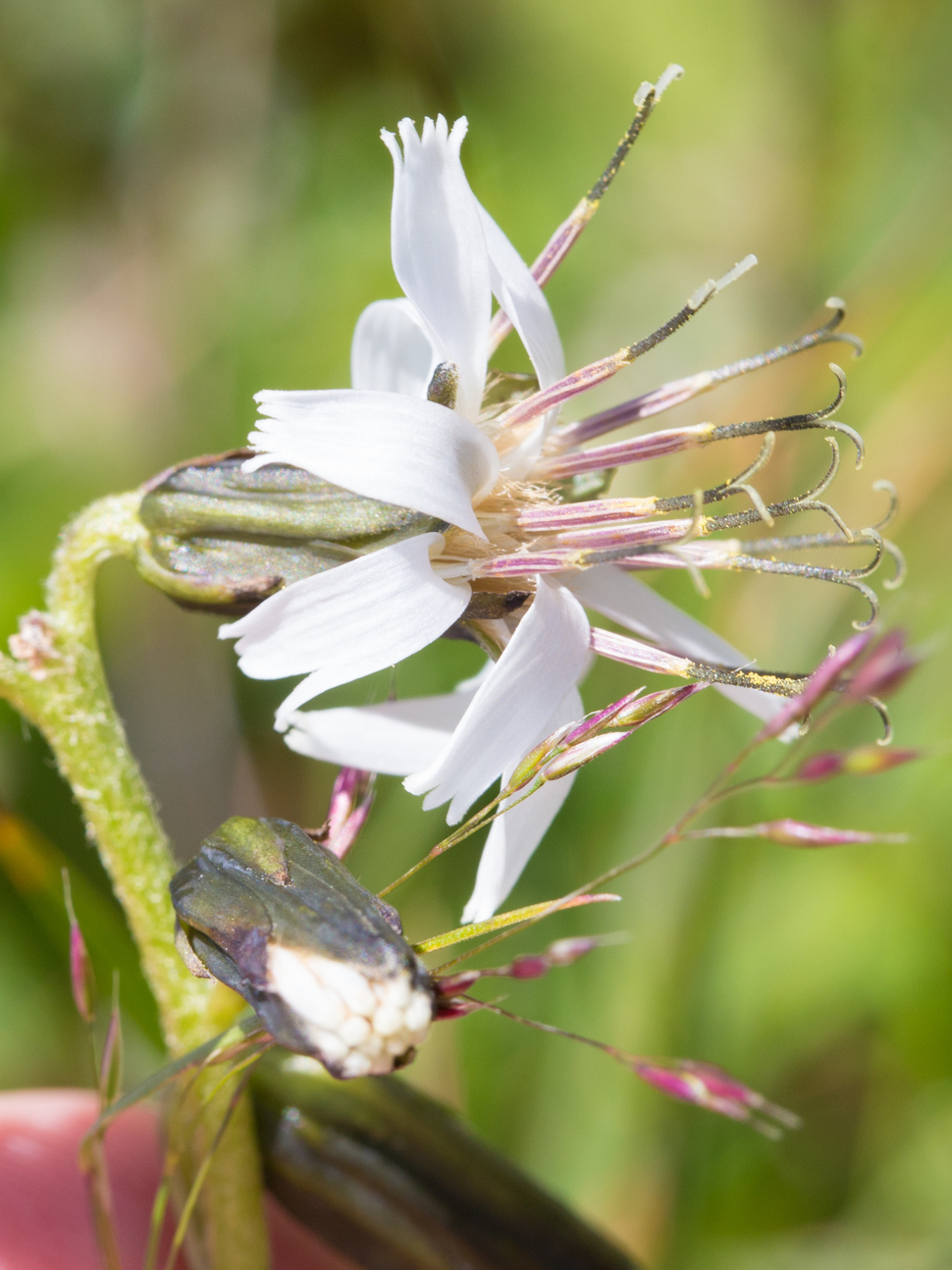

Conservation status
- Imperiled (NatureServe)

Scientific classification
- Kingdom: Plantae
- Clade: Tracheophytes
- Clade: Angiosperms
- Clade: Eudicots
- Clade: Asterids
- Order: Asterales
- Family: Asteraceae
- Genus: Nabalus
- Species: N. boottii

Binomial name
- Nabalus boottii DC.

Synonyms
- Prenanthes boottii (DC.) D.Dietr.

= Nabalus boottii =

Species of herbaceous plant

Nabalus boottii, commonly known as alpine rattlesnake root or Boott's rattlesnake root, is a species of alpine perennial plant in the family Asteraceae endemic to the northeastern United States. The specific epithet boottii is named after the Bostonian botanist John Wright Boott, who first collected the plant in the White Mountains of New Hampshire in 1829.

== Description ==
N. boottii is a single-stemmed herbaceous perennial reaching 5–25 cm (2.0–9.8 in) in height. It emerges from short, thick taproots. The stem may be upright or growing horizontally along the ground. It is mottled purple, glabrous at the base and tomentose near the distal end.

The cauline leaves each have a petiole 2–8 cm (0.79–3.15 in) long, and have ovate to deltate blades 2–8 cm (0.79–3.15 in) long by 0.5–3 cm (0.20–1.18 in) wide. The basal leaves are hastate or sagittate, with the margins being entire or weakly dentate.

The flowerheads are arranged in narrow arrays of 10-20, each containing 9-20 white florets 7-13 mm long. The involucre subtending the inflorescence is cylindrical to bell-shaped, 10-11 mm long by 5-6 mm wide. It is composed of 8-11 blackish green phyllaries which smooth, subulate to lanceolate in shape, and 8-12 mm long.

The fruit is a light tan to yellow cypsela, 5-6 mm wide, with 7-10 indistinct ribs. The seeds are wind-dispersed, with pale yellow pappi, 6-8 mm long.

N. boottii flowers between July and August. The species is monocarpic, flowering and seeding after two or more growing seasons. It primarily reproduces clonally.

== Distribution and habitat ==
N. boottii is found elusively in alpine habitats above treeline between 1,000–1,800 m (3,300–5,900 ft) in elevation, where it frequently grows alongside the related N. trifoliolatus.

It has an extremely narrow-range, being restricted to fewer than twenty occurrences, clustered in six locations throughout the highest peaks of New England and New York State. It occurs on Boundary Bald Mountain and Mount Katahdin in Maine, Mount Washington and Mount Eisenhower in New Hampshire, Mount Mansfield and Camel's Hump in Vermont, and the highest peaks of the Adirondacks in New York. The size of these populations range from over 25,000 individuals to just a few plants. The estimated global population is nearly 130,000 individuals, with almost 90% of those individuals being found in the vicinity of Mt. Washington.

== Conservation status and threats ==
N. boottii is designated as an imperiled species (G2) globally, and critically imperiled (S1) in each of the four US states it occurs. The alpine habitats on which this species depends are fragile and easily impacted. Many of the existing populations are found in popular areas for recreation, making them particularly vulnerable to trampling and other disturbances. Like other alpine endemic plants, N. boottii is particularly vulnerable to the affects of climate change, which is expected to disrupt high-elevation ecoystems globally.
