= Little River State Park =

State park in Washington County, Vermont

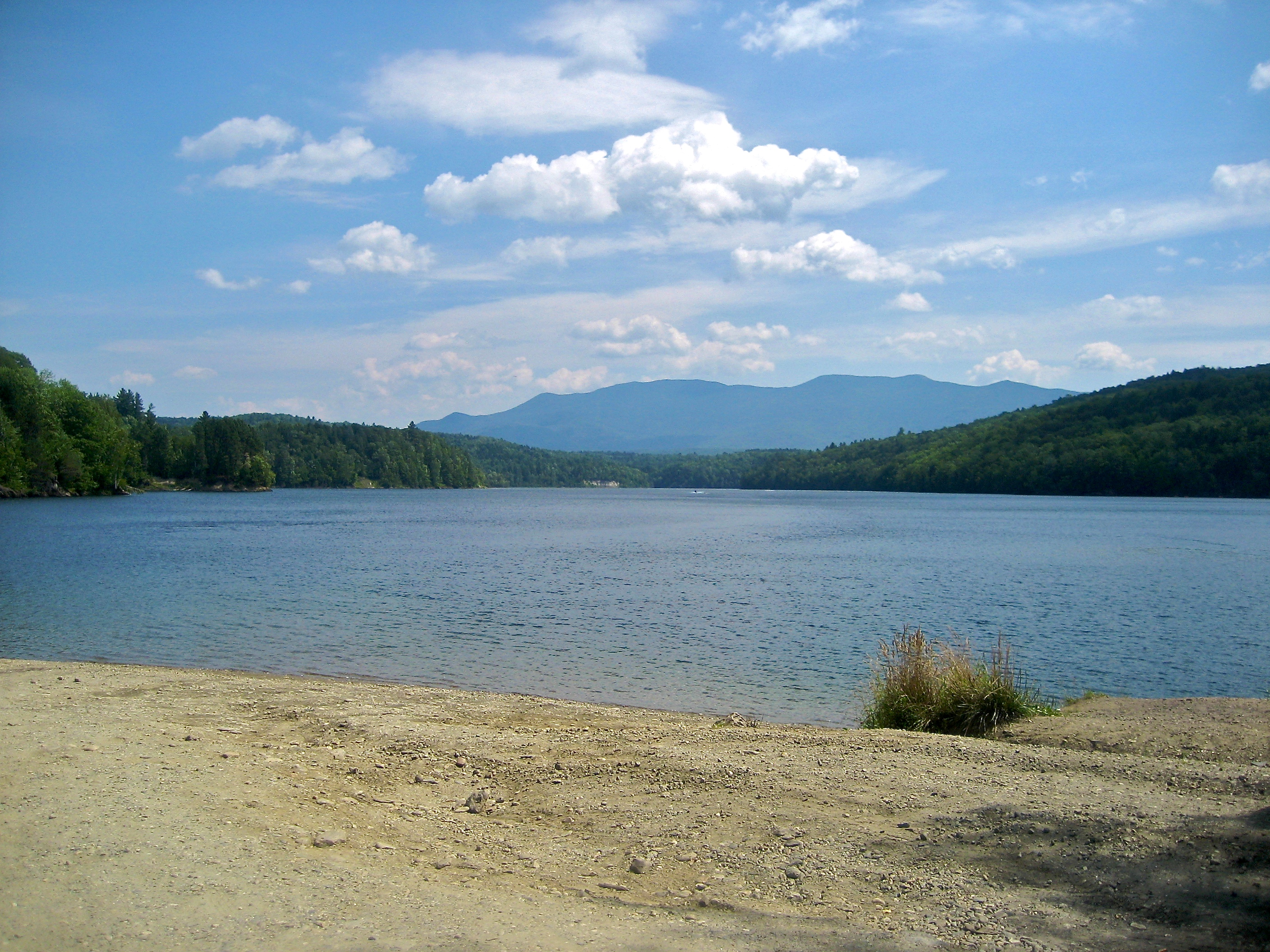

- Location within Vermont
- Interactive map of Little River State Park
- Location: Waterbury, Vermont, United States
- Coordinates: 44°23′24″N 72°46′02″W
- Administrator: Vermont Department of Forests, Parks, and Recreation
- Website: Official website
- Vermont State Parks

Little River State Park is a campground state park on the 850-acre Waterbury Reservoir in Waterbury, Vermont. It is located in Mount Mansfield State Forest. Activities includes swimming, boating, fishing, hiking, picnicking, bicycling, wildlife watching, and winter sports.

Facilities include 70 tent/trailer sites, 20 lean-tos, five cabins, restrooms with hot showers, and a dump station. Campers can enjoy swimming beaches, play areas, a boat launch, ball field, and boat rentals. There is a nature center, and park Interpreters offer programs including night hikes, campfire programs, amphibian explorations, and nature crafts and games.
