= Appalachian Gap =

Mountain pass located in Vermont, U.S.

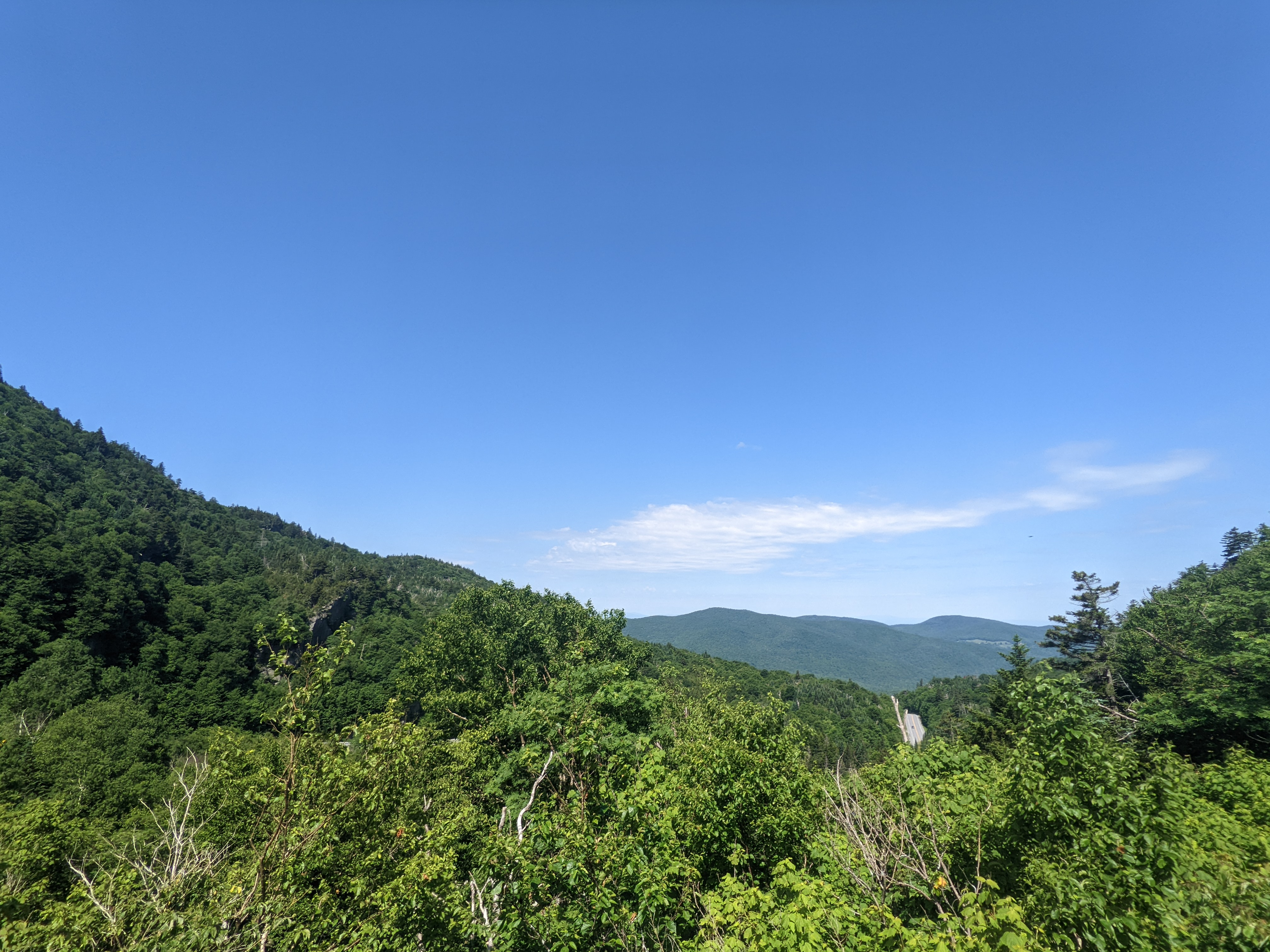
- Westerly view from the Appalachian Gap
- Interactive map of Appalachian Gap
- Elevation: 724 metres (2,375 ft)
- Traversed by: VT 17

Third Approach
- Location: Buels Gore, Chittenden County, Vermont, United States
- Range: Green Mountains
- Coordinates: 44°12.65′N 72°55.86′W
- Topo map: USGS Mount Ellen

The Appalachian Gap is a mountain pass in the Green Mountains of Vermont. The highest point of the pass is located in Chittenden County, about 0.2 mi (0.32 km) west of the boundary between Chittenden and Washington County. The pass is in the Camel's Hump State Park.

On the east side, Appalachian Gap is drained by Mill Brook, which drains into the Mad River, the Winooski River, and into Lake Champlain. To the west, the gap is drained by Beaver Meadow Brook, which drains into the Huntington River, another tributary of the Winooski River. Lake Champlain drains into the Richelieu River in Quebec, thence into the Saint Lawrence River, and into the Gulf of Saint Lawrence.

The Long Trail, a 272-mile (438 km) hiking trail running the length of Vermont, crosses Appalachian Gap between Stark Mountain to the south, and Baby Stark Mountain to the north. The Gap is a very popular route for tourists and affords excellent views of the Champlain Valley, Lake Champlain and the Adirondack Mountains. It is also a popular motorcycle and road biking destination. The ride from either side up route 17 from is several kilometers with sustained pitches of 15% plus. The summit of Appalachian Gap is the finish point for the road race stage (stage 3) of the annual Green Mountain Stage Race.

The Mad River Glen ski area is just south of the gap, on the east side of Stark Mountain.
