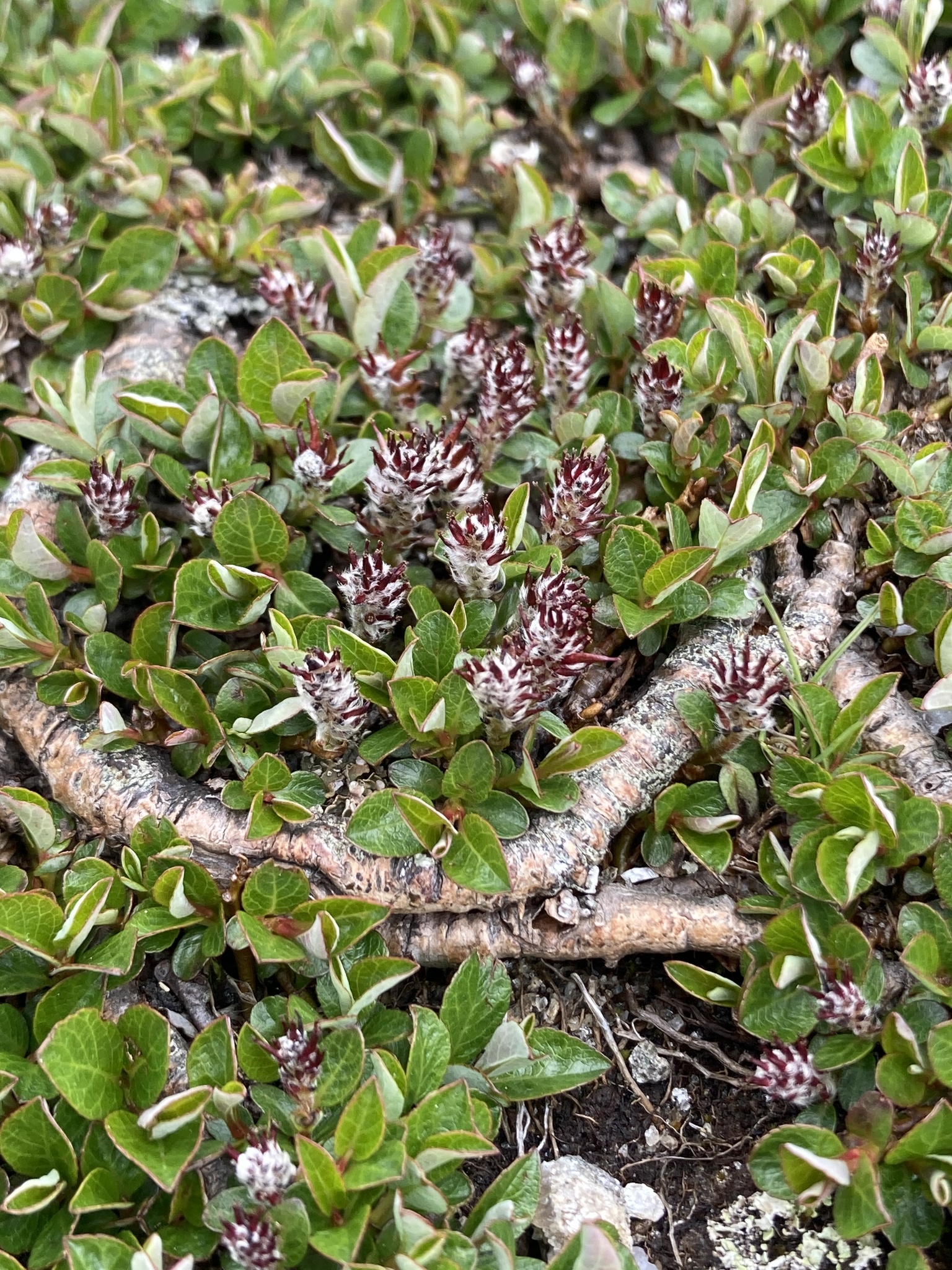
- In the White Mountain National Forest
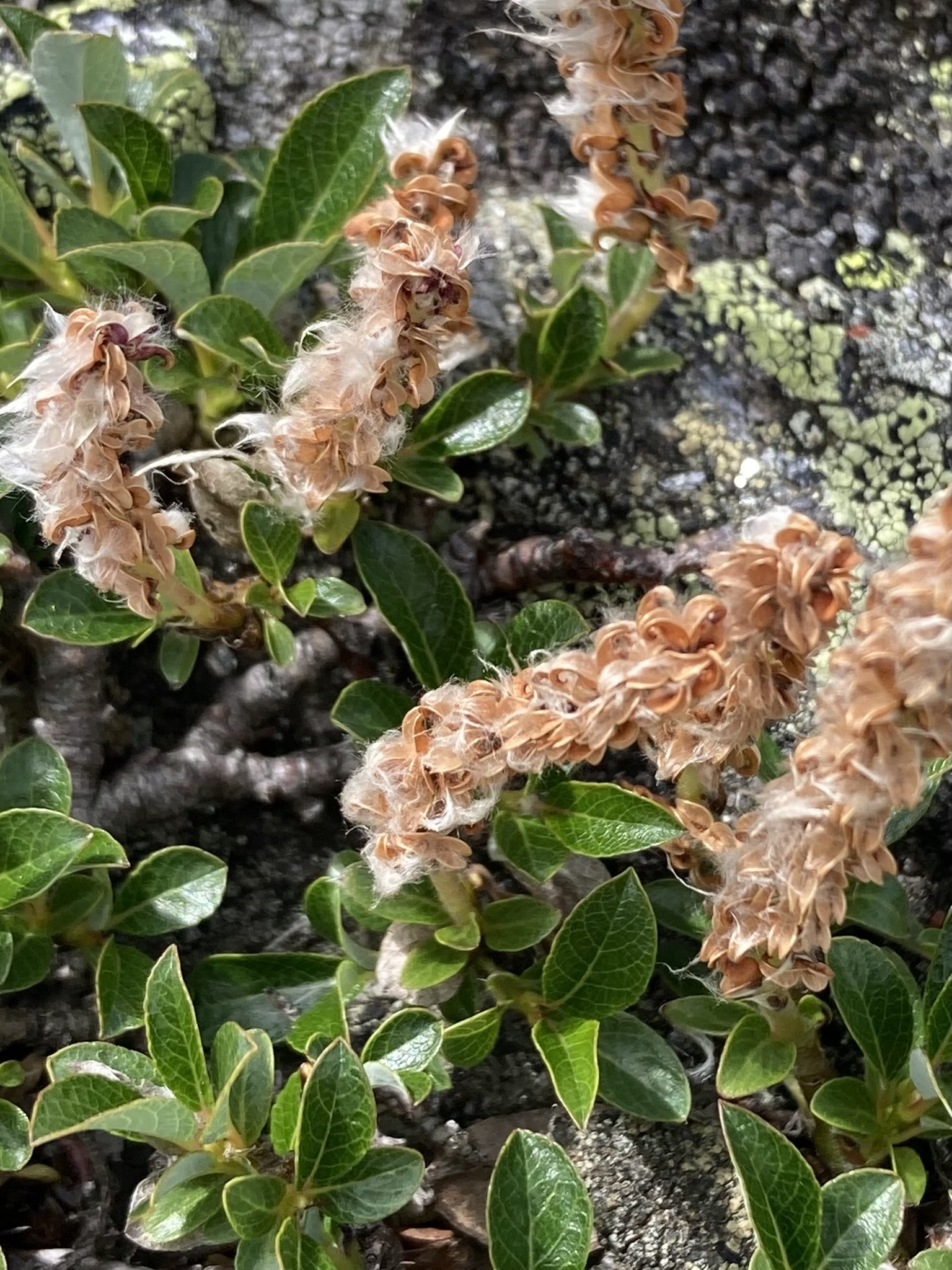
- Seeding

Conservation status
- Secure (NatureServe)

Scientific classification
- Kingdom: Plantae
- Clade: Embryophytes
- Clade: Tracheophytes
- Clade: Angiosperms
- Clade: Eudicots
- Clade: Rosids
- Order: Malpighiales
- Family: Salicaceae
- Genus: Salix
- Species: S. uva-ursi

Binomial name
- Salix uva-ursi Pursh

Synonyms
- List: Salix arbuscula var. labradorica Andersson; Salix cutleri var. labradorica Andersson; Salix cutleri f. major Andersson; Salix cutleri f. minor Andersson; Salix ivigtutiana Lundstr.; Salix prostrata Muhl.; Salix retusa Oakes ex Tucker; Salix uva-ursi f. lasiophylla Fernald; Salix uva-ursi f. phyllolepis Fernald; Vimen uva-ursi (Pursh) Raf.

= Salix uva-ursi =

Species of flowering plant

Salix uva-ursi, commonly known as bearberry willow, saule raisin-d'ours in French, and Uqaujaq (ᐅᖃᐅᔭᖅ) in Inuktitut, is a species of dwarf shrub in the willow family Salicaceae. It is endemic to arctic and alpine regions of northeastern North America. The specific epithet uva-ursi was given to the species by the describing botanist Frederick Pursh, who noted that its habit and leaves resembled those of Arctostaphylos uva-ursi.

== Description ==
S. uva-ursi is a prostrate subshrub reaching 1–5 cm (0.39–1.97 in) in height. It forms dense compact clonal mats by layering. The bark of the stems, which trail along the ground, may be red-brown, grey-brown, or yellow-brown, and glabrous. Bark on newer branches may be yellow-green or yellow-brown, glabrous or pubescent.

The leaves are ovate to broadly obovate or elliptic, 4-23 mm long by 3.5-10 mm wide. The leaf margins can be entire, serrulate or crenulate. The abaxial surface is glaucous and usually glabrous. The adaxial surface is glossy and usually glabrous. The leaves die annually but may persist on the plant for several years. This may serve to increase the boundary layer of the plant, protecting it from wind and snow erosion.

The inflorescences of S. uva-ursi are catkins, with male and female catkins being produced on separate plants. The pistillate (female) catkins stand erect among the leaves and are densely flowered, slender to subglobose in shape, and 11-47 mm long (expanding to -55 mm when fruiting) by 6-10 mm wide. The pistillate flowers consist of a stipe that is 0.3-1.6 mm long. The ovary is ovoid to pyriform, glabrous, and gradually tapers to the styles. There are 4-9 ovules per ovary. The styles are 0.4-1 mm long and the flat stigmas are 0.1-0.4 mm long. The staminate (male) catkins are 9-19 mm long by 5-8 mm wide. Each staminate flower has a single There is a single stamen per staminate flower, consisting of a glabrous filament and an ellipsoid or shortly cyndrical anther that is 0.4-0.7 mm long. The fruits are 3-5 mm long capsules.

Flowering occurs from mid-June to early August, and fruiting occurs from early July to late September.

Due to the harsh environments in which it grows, S. uva-ursi is very slow-growing and exhibits extended individual longevity. It is a semi-ring porous species and produces well-defined annual growth rings. Dendrochronological studies in the Whapmagoostui–Kuujjuarapik area of Nunavik, Quebec showed that individuals may reach over 100 years in age, with the oldest individual sampled being 170 years old.

In New Hampshire and populations further north, S. uva-ursi is known to hybridize naturally with S. herbacea, producing the hybrid species Salix × peasei.

== Distribution and habitat ==
S. uva-ursi is restricted to arctic, sub-arctic, and alpine regions of northeastern North America. It is found in western Greenland; Saint Pierre and Miquelon; and Nunavut, Nunavik, Newfoundland and Labrador, and Nova Scotia in Canada. At the southern extent of its range, small populations grow in the high peaks of Maine, New Hampshire, Vermont, and New York. It may be found at elevations from near sea-level to 1,200 m (3,900 ft). A fossilized leaf collected from Butler County, Ohio, identified as S. uva-ursi, indicates that the species once had a much wider distribution in North America.

It grows in dry or moist exposed sites in calcareous, serpentine, dioritic, or granitic soils. It often becomes established in cracks in rocks or boulders, but may also grow on sandy beaches or in snowbeds.

== Conservation status ==
S. uva-ursi is categorized as a secure (G5) species globally by NatureServe. It is designated as an imperiled species in the southern extent of its range. The table below lists the subnational conservation statuses for each Canadian Province and US State in which it occurs.

National & Provincial/State Conservation Statuses
Subnational Rank	Canada (N5)	United States (NNR)
S5 (secure)	Labrador, Quebec	
S4 (apparently secure)	Island of Newfoundland, Nunavat	
S3 (vulnerable)		
S2 (imperiled)		New Hampshire, New York
S1 (critically imperiled)	Nova Scotia	Maine, Vermont

The slow-growth rate of this species and its sporadic reproduction hinders its ability to compete with other plant species in milder climates. On the high peaks of New York and New England, it is particularly threatened by trampling due to hiker traffic.
