= Catamount Trail =

Nordic ski trail in Vermont, US

Coordinates: 44.29641°N 72.9220656°W

The Catamount Trail is a long-distance, Nordic ski trail that spans the length of Vermont, extending more than 300 miles (480 km) from the border with Massachusetts at Readsboro, Vermont, to the Canada–United States border at North Troy, Vermont.

== History ==
The trail was first skied in 1984 by its founders, Steve Bushey, Paul Jarris, and Ben Rose. It was initially conceived as Bushey's thesis project when he was a geography student at the University of Vermont. Since then, the Catamount Trail has been maintained by the Catamount Trail Association, initially incorporated in 1984. The Association coordinates volunteers, publishes a guidebook, and works to protect and preserve the trail. As of 2007, twenty-nine skiers had reported to the Association that they have skied the entire length of the Catamount Trail.

== Geography ==
The terrain of the trail ranges from challenging, for which climbing skins, metal edges and telemarking skills are often necessary, to gentler terrain where lightweight classic Nordic equipment is more appropriate. It interconnects several of Vermont's Nordic ski centers.
