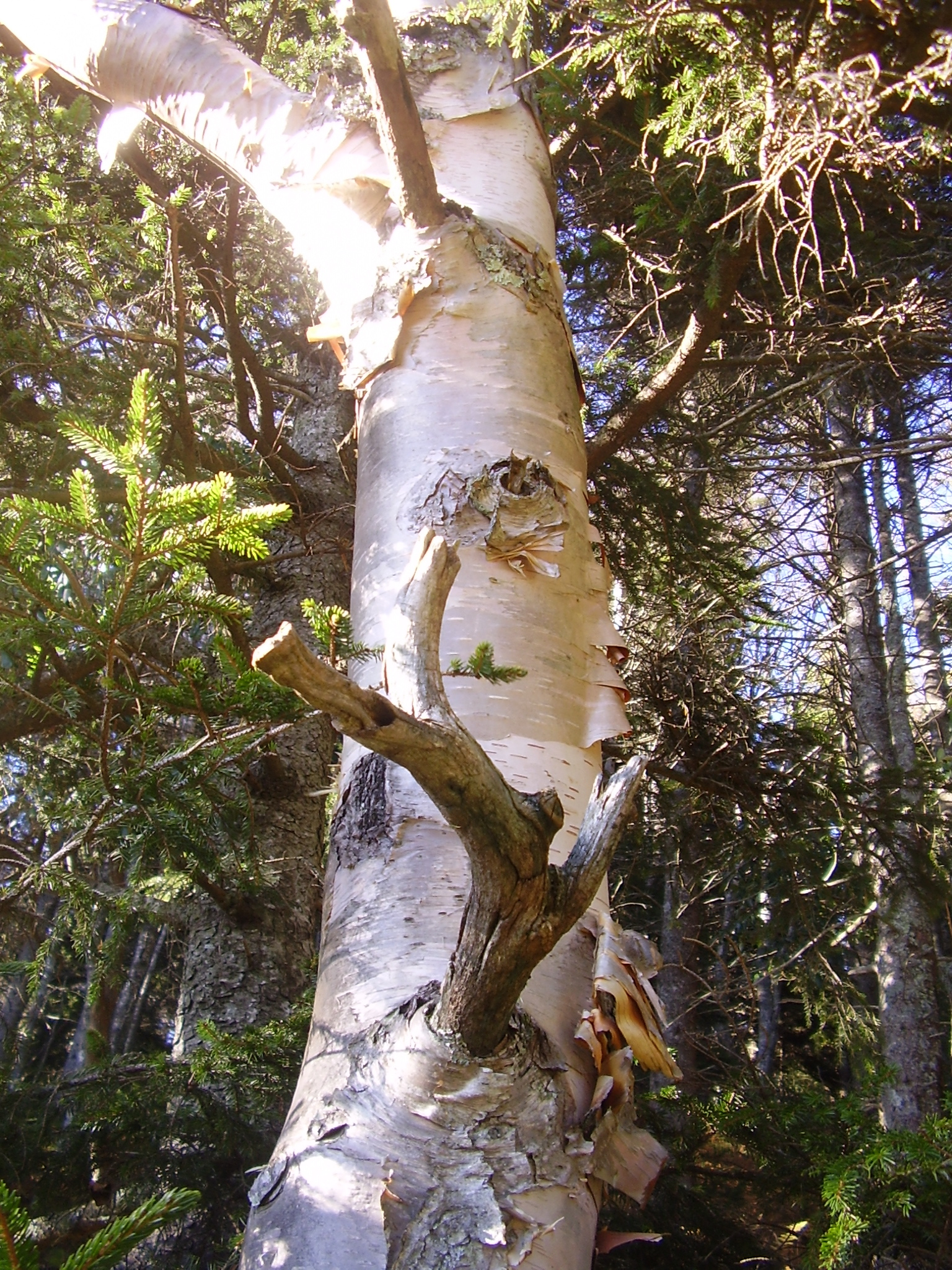

Conservation status
- Least Concern (IUCN 3.1)

Scientific classification
- Kingdom: Plantae
- Clade: Embryophytes
- Clade: Tracheophytes
- Clade: Angiosperms
- Clade: Eudicots
- Clade: Rosids
- Order: Fagales
- Family: Betulaceae
- Genus: Betula
- Subgenus: Betula subg. Betula
- Species: B. cordifolia

Binomial name
- Betula cordifolia Regel

Synonyms
- Betula alba var. cordifolia; Betula papyrifera var. cordifolia

= Betula cordifolia =

Species of birch

Betula cordifolia, the mountain paper birch or heartleaf birch (also known as mountain white birch or eastern paper birch) is a birch species native to Eastern Canada and the Northeastern United States. Until recently it was considered a variety of Betula papyrifera (paper birch), with which it shares many characteristics, and it was classified as B. papyrifera var. cordifolia (Regel) Fern.

== Description ==
Betula cordifolia is a deciduous tree that reaches heights of about 60 feet or 25 m and a trunk diameter of about 30 inches or about 75 cm. Mature bark is white or bronze-white, peeling in thin layers. The inner surface of the bark is copper-coloured and the young bark is shiny brown with pale brown lenticels. The leaves are alternate, ovate, 6–12 cm long, and double-toothed. As the specific epithet suggests, the leaf base is generally cordate (heart-shaped), however this can be misleading as it is occasionally flat or rounded. The leaves are dotted with many resin glands and the buds are ovoid and blunt. The twigs are yellow-brown to dark-brown and are dotted with resin glands and gray lenticels. They lack the hairs found on Betula papyrifera. The flowers are catkins, with pollen catkins 2–4 cm long and seed catkins 1–2 cm long. The seed catkins mature to about 3–5 cm long and bear winged nutlets about 2–3 mm long.

== Distribution ==
Betula cordifolia is found in Atlantic Canada, Quebec, northwestern Ontario, Northern New York State, and New England. It is generally found in northern habitats or high elevations, particularly on moist ground. It is also found at high elevations on the slopes of the Black Mountains in Western North Carolina.

== Distinctions from Betula papyrifera ==
Betula cordifolia and Betula papyrifera are very similar species, indeed they were once considered the same species. The primary methods of distinguishing the one from the other include:

- Betula cordifolia is only found in the Eastern part of North America
- Its leaves are dotted with resin glands
- The leaf base is cordate (heart-shaped)
- Young shoots are not hairy.
- It is generally diploid (28 chromosomes)

Since many of these characteristics vary from tree to tree, ideally several of these characteristics should be noted before making a positive identification. It has been suggested that Betula cordifolia and Betula papyrifera hybridise, however this is unlikely given the more recent evidence of different chromosome numbers. The trees make nearly identical bark, sapwood and heartwood. Both species are mainly used for manufactured wood products, such as lumber, plywood, OSB, paper pulp and wood pellets. As processed firewood, both species produce excellent heat, but burn relatively quickly, however with little to no smoke. The most conclusive method of identification is from chromosome analysis.
