= Buels Gore, Vermont =

Unincorporated portion of Chittenden County Vermont

Coordinates: 44°12′30″N 72°57′00″W

Location in Chittenden County and the state of Vermont

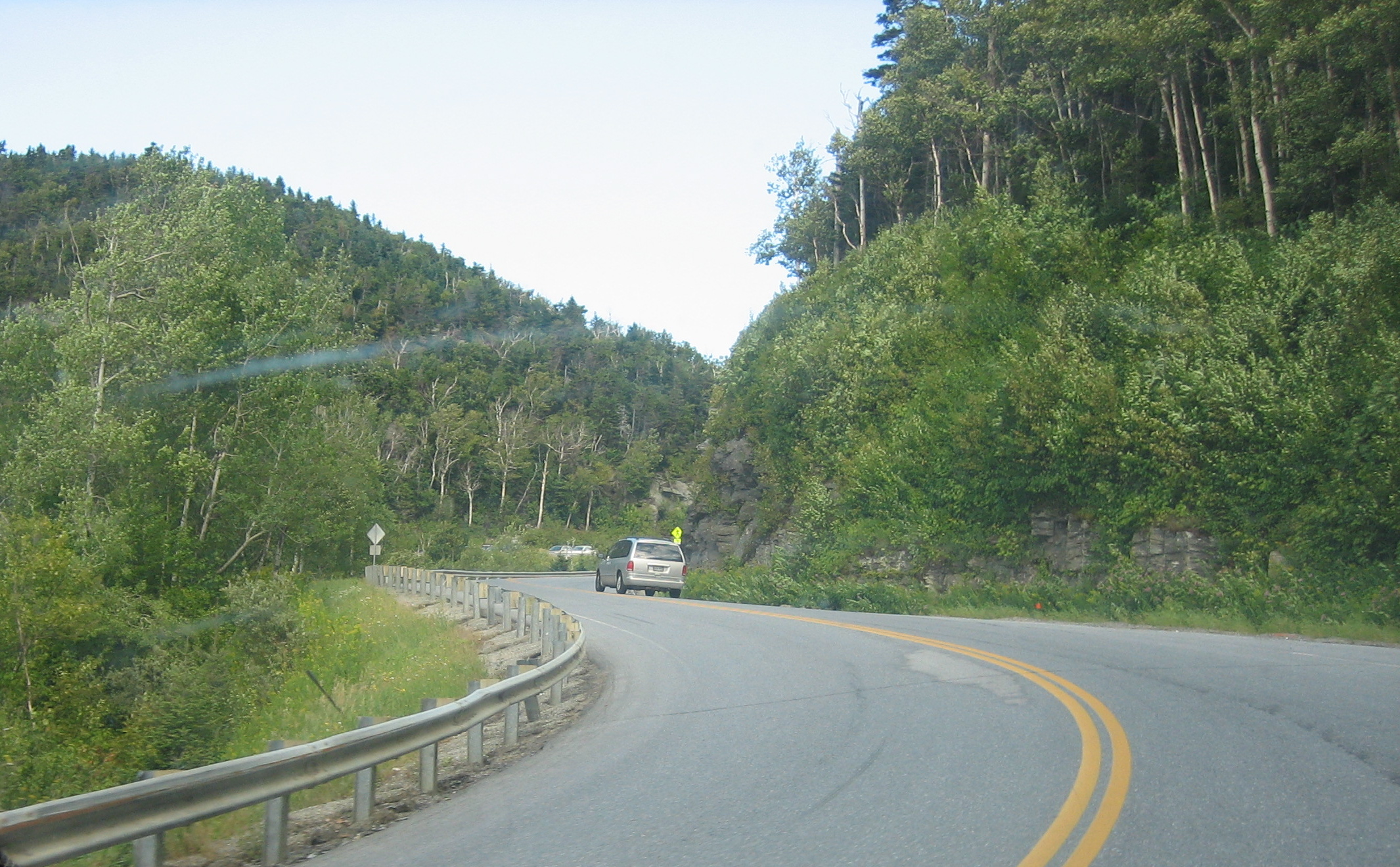
Route 17 heading through Buels Gore

Buels Gore is a gore in Chittenden County, Vermont, United States. The population was 29 at the 2020 census, down from 30 in 2010. In Vermont, gores and grants are unincorporated portions of a county which are not part of any town and have limited self-government (if any, as many are uninhabited).

== Geography ==
Buels Gore is located at the southern tip of Chittenden County, bordered by the town of Huntington to the north, Fayston in Washington County to the east, and Starksboro in Addison County to the west. The crest of the Green Mountains, followed by the Long Trail, runs through the eastern side of the gore, and Vermont Route 17 crosses the gore from east to west, cresting the mountains at Appalachian Gap.

According to the United States Census Bureau, Buels Gore has a total area of 5.0 square miles (12.9 km^{2}), of which 0.004 square miles (0.01 km^{2}), or 0.08%, is water.

== The name in history ==
The gore was chartered by the Vermont General Assembly on November 4, 1780. It is named for Major Elias Buel (in some references "Buell") who moved to Vermont from Coventry, Connecticut. With a group of would-be proprietors including Ira Allen and several Buel family members, the group petitioned the legislature for a grant. They received a grant for a town, intended to be called "Coventry" near Shoreham. Due to a surveying error there was almost no land left in the grant. The group returned to the legislature and received a "flying grant", a sort of license which allowed a grant to be made on uncharted land that could be identified. As much of the state had by now been organized, they finally settled upon three unconnected pieces of land. The largest became the present town of Coventry in Orleans County. A second piece near Coventry was named "Coventry Leg" for its appendage shape. Coventry Leg was annexed to Newport in 1816. The final small piece, adjacent to Huntington, was called "Huntington Gore", and renamed "Buels Gore", despite Major Buel's desire to call it "Montzoar". All three charters were issued in October 1788, though dated back to 1780, the year of the original petition. Buel was charged retroactive taxes on the grant, a debt that only resolved by sale of all of his lands. He left Vermont to settle in New York.

== Demographics ==
Historical population
Census	Pop.	Note	%±
1790	31		—

As of the census of 2000, there were 12 people, 6 households, and 4 families residing in the gore. The population density was 2.4 people per square mile (0.9/km^{2}). There were 8 housing units at an average density of 1.6/sq mi (0.6/km^{2}). The racial makeup of the gore was 100.00% White.

There were 6 households, out of which 16.7% had children under the age of 18 living with them, 66.7% were couples living together and joined in either marriage or civil union, and 33.3% were non-families. 33.3% of all households were made up of individuals, and none had someone living alone who was 65 years of age or older. The average household size was 2.00 and the average family size was 2.50.

In the gore the population was spread out, with 8.3% under the age of 18, 8.3% from 18 to 24, 25.0% from 25 to 44, 33.3% from 45 to 64, and 25.0% who were 65 years of age or older. The median age was 49 years. For every 100 females, there were 200.0 males. For every 100 females age 18 and over, there were 175.0 males.

The median income for a household in the gore was $39,583, and the median income for a family was $61,250. Males had a median income of $38,750 versus $21,250 for females. The per capita income for the gore was $32,533. None of the population or families were below the poverty line.

== Bicycle racing ==
Buels Gore and the summit of Appalachian Gap are the site for the finish of the Mad River Road Race which is stage 3 of the Green Mountain Stage Race road bicycle event. This final climb is considered one of the most scenic and challenging finishes for a bicycle race with grades near the summit of 18%. The Mad River Road race started in 1994 and became a stage in the Green Mountain Stage Race in 2000. Annually the event brings between 700-900 racers to the gore to compete.
