= Mad River (Vermont) =

Stream in Washington County, Vermont, United States

Coordinates: 44.0772406°N 72.8471442°W

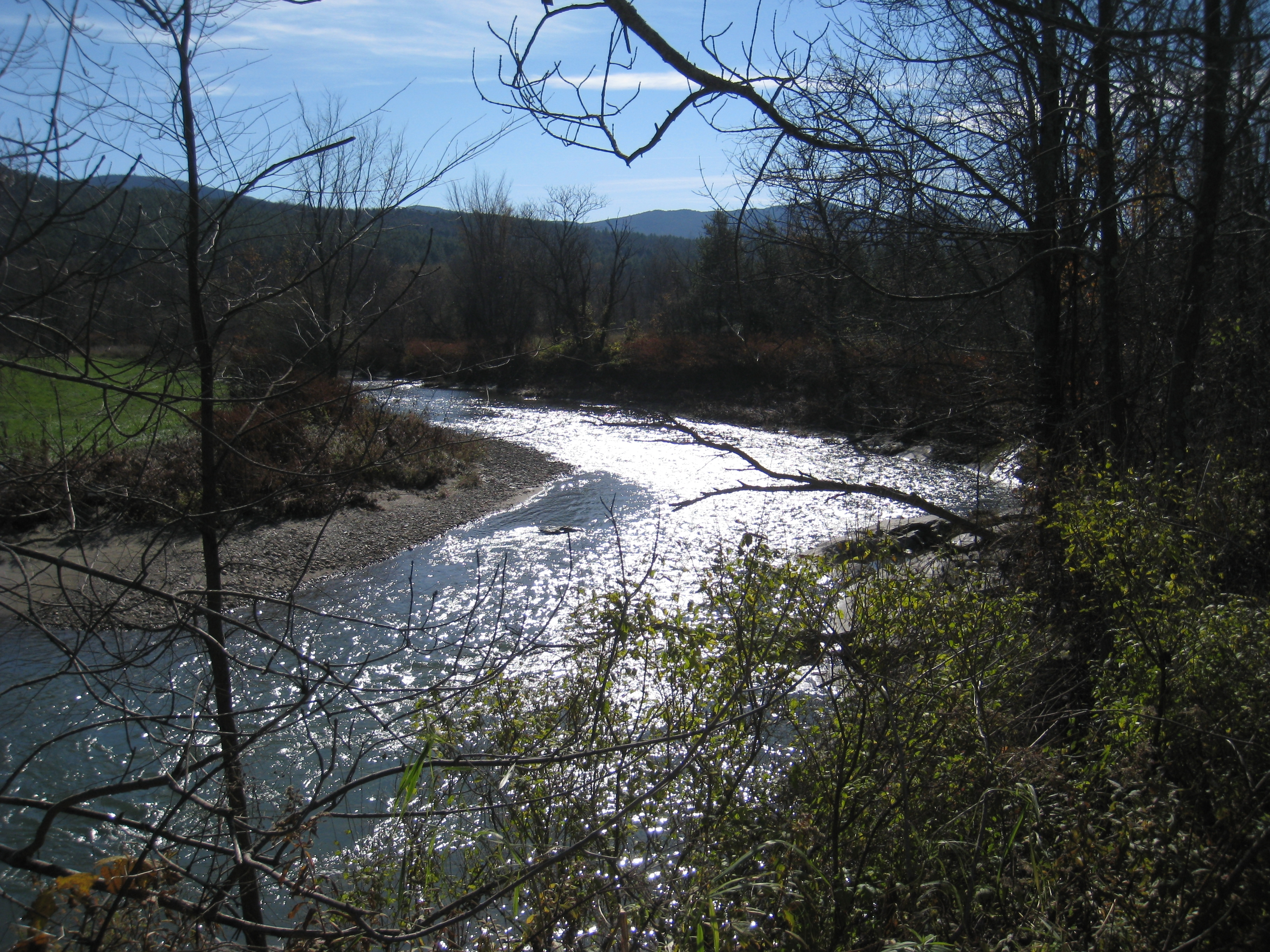
The Mad River in 2012

The Mad River is a tributary to the Winooski River in Vermont. It has its headwaters in Granville Gulf, then flows north through the towns of Warren, Waitsfield, and Moretown before entering the Winooski River just downstream from Middlesex. Other towns within the Mad River watershed are the entire Town of Fayston and a portion of the Town of Duxbury. Relative to other rivers in the state, the Mad River is fairly rocky and clear, making it a popular for swimming. In the summer of 2008, didymo, or rock snot, was found in the upper portions of the river.

The Mad River Valley is a popular region with tourists due to its scenery and two ski areas, Mad River Glen and Sugarbush Resort. Since 1990, the Friends of the Mad River – a non-profit formed to preserve and protect the recreational, ecological and aesthetic resources of the Mad River – has been engaged in citizen-based water quality monitoring, river restoration, land conservation, and public education and outreach on behalf of the Mad River watershed.

== See also ==
- List of rivers of Vermont
