= Fayston, Vermont =

- Town
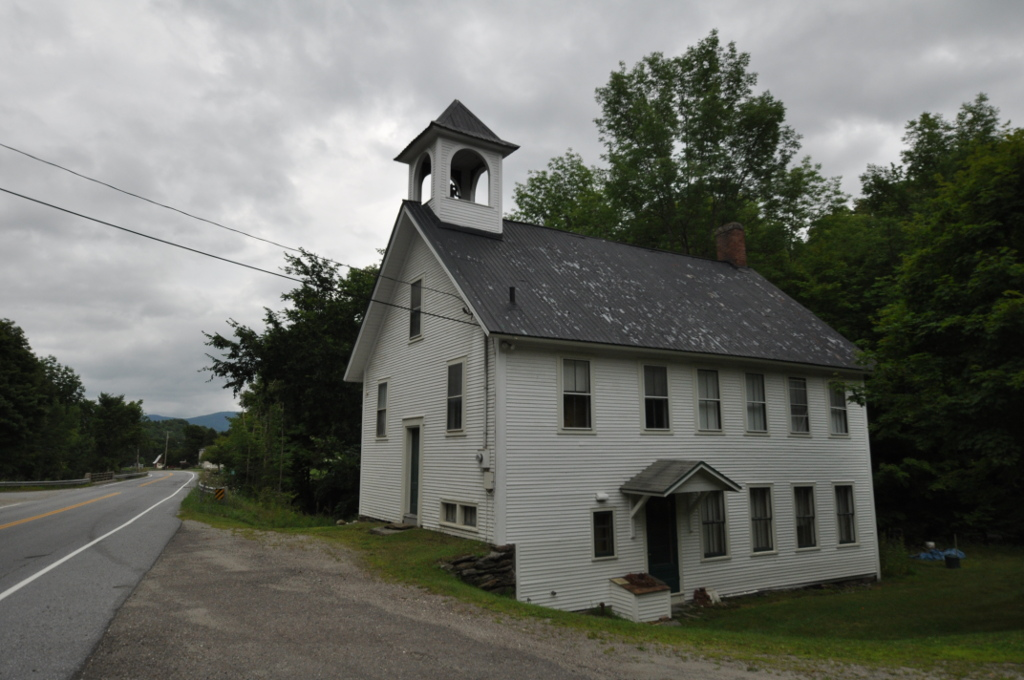
- Fayston Town Hall

- Location in Washington County and the state of Vermont
- Coordinates: 44°13′54″N 72°51′47″W
- Country: United States
- State: Vermont
- County: Washington
- Communities: North Fayston

Area
  - Total: 36.5 sq mi (94.5 km^{2})
  - Land: 36.5 sq mi (94.5 km^{2})
  - Water: 0 sq mi (0.0 km^{2})
- Elevation: 2,038 ft (621 m)

Population (2020)
  - Total: 1,364
  - Density: 37.4/sq mi (14.4/km^{2})
- Time zone: UTC-5 (Eastern (EST))
  - Summer (DST): UTC-4 (EDT)
- ZIP Codes: 05660 (Moretown); 05673 (Waitsfield)
- Area code: 802
- FIPS code: 50-25825
- GNIS feature ID: 1462096
- Website: www.faystonvt.com

Fayston (/ˈfeɪstən/) is a town in Washington County, Vermont, United States. The population was 1,364 at the 2020 census.

== History ==
The town was chartered in 1788 and sold to a speculator. The town was organized in 1805. The Mad River Glen ski area, located in Fayston on Stark Mountain, was founded in 1947. The town was home to a small one-room schoolhouse as well as several family farmers and maple producers, which contributed to the town's economic growth and stability.

== Geography ==
According to the United States Census Bureau, the town has a total area of 36.5 square miles (94.5 km^{2}), all land. The town is located in the Mad River valley and is south of Camel's Hump State Park. Fayston is located on Vermont Route 17. Burnt Rock Mountain is located in Fayston.

== Demographics ==
Historical population
Census	Pop.	Note	%±
1800	18		—
1810	149		727.8%
1820	263		76.5%
1830	458		74.1%
1840	635		38.6%
1850	684		7.7%
1860	800		17.0%
1870	694		−13.2%
1880	638		−8.1%
1890	533		−16.5%
1900	466		−12.6%
1910	452		−3.0%
1920	424		−6.2%
1930	318		−25.0%
1940	284		−10.7%
1950	172		−39.4%
1960	158		−8.1%
1970	292		84.8%
1980	657		125.0%
1990	846		28.8%
2000	1,141		34.9%
2010	1,353		18.6%
2020	1,364		0.8%
U.S. Decennial Census

As of the 2000 census, there were 1,141 people, 484 households, and 312 families residing in the town. The population density was 31.3 people per square mile (12.1/km^{2}). There were 900 housing units at an average density of 24.7 per square mile (9.5/km^{2}). The racial makeup of the town was 98.25% White, 0.53% African American, 0.18% Native American, 0.09% Asian, and 0.96% from two or more races. Hispanic or Latino of any race were 0.96% of the population.

There were 484 households, out of which 30.4% had children under the age of 18 living with them, 56.4% were married couples living together, 6.4% had a female householder with no husband present, and 35.5% were non-families. 25.0% of all households were made up of individuals, and 5.6% had someone living alone who was 65 years of age or older. The average household size was 2.36 and the average family size was 2.85.

In the town, the population was spread out, with 22.8% under the age of 18, 5.7% from 18 to 24, 33.2% from 25 to 44, 28.7% from 45 to 64, and 9.6% who were 65 years of age or older. The median age was 39 years. For every 100 females, there were 103.0 males. For every 100 females age 18 and over, there were 101.6 males.

The median income for a household in the town was $53,472, and the median income for a family was $60,938. Males had a median income of $35,139 versus $26,852 for females. The per capita income for the town was $28,196. About 2.9% of families and 5.5% of the population were below the poverty line, including 4.3% of those under age 18 and 5.6% of those age 65 or over.

== Education ==
It is in the Harwood Unified Union School District. The comprehensive high school of the district is the Harwood Union Middle and High School.
