= Mary Nettie Chase =

American suffragist (1863/64–1959)

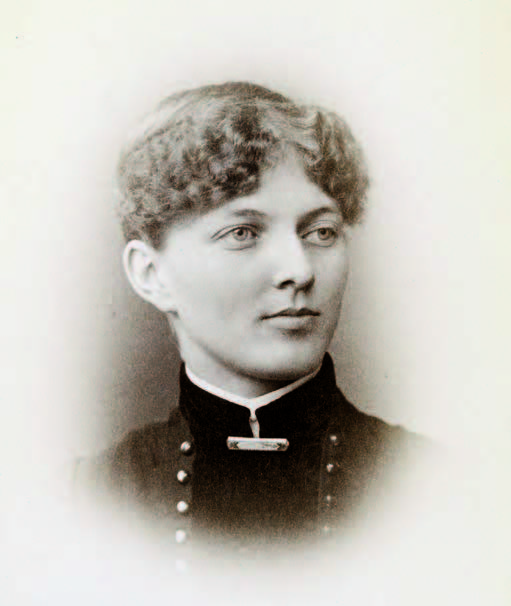
Mary Nettie Chase c. 1885

Mary Nettie Chase (December 28, 1863 - December 30, 1959) was an American educator, suffragist , and peace activist.

== Background ==
There are two accounts of Chase's birth: December 28, 1863, or January 19, 1864, in Madison, New Hampshire. Chase's father, Uriah Chase, worked as a Baptist minister. She married Roscoe G. Watson in June of 1890 and was separated from him by 1900. Chase graduated from Bates College in 1885 with a Master of Arts. From 1887 to 1890 and 1892 to 1895, Chase worked as a teacher at Green Mountain Seminary in Waterbury Center, Vermont.

Chase was a successful suffrage organizer in Vermont and was praised by the Woman's Journal in 1901 for her recruitment efforts. Chase spoke at the 1902 Vermont women's suffrage convention held in West Concord on June 18 and 19. She was a member of the Vermont Woman Suffrage Association (VWSA) and worked as a lecturer for the National American Woman Suffrage Association (NAWSA). From 1901 to 1912, she served as the president of the New Hampshire Woman Suffrage Association (NHWSA).

She worked as the secretary for the peace organization, the Society for the Promotion of International Amity, in 1917. Chase worked as a peace activist throughout World War I. Part of her work included promoting Spanish language classes in New Hampshire. She died in Boston on December 30, 1959.
