= Gale-Bancroft House =

Historic house in Vermont, United States

- U.S. National Register of Historic Places
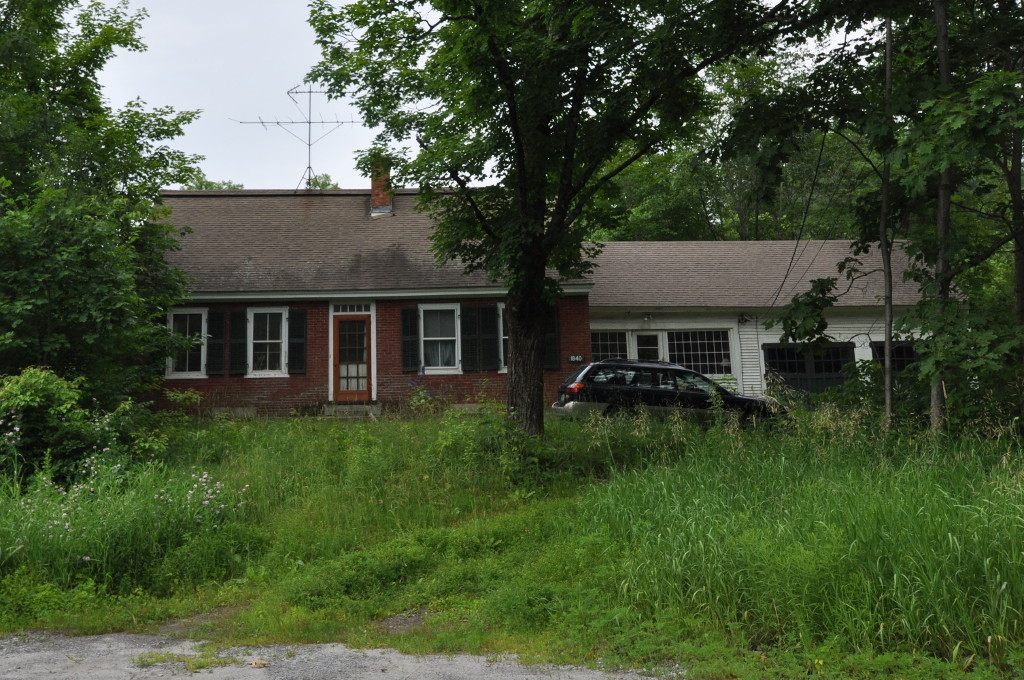

- Location within Vermont Location within the United States
- Location: Brook Rd., Plainfield, Vermont
- Coordinates: 44°16′32″N 72°25′23″W
- Area: 2.2 acres (0.89 ha)
- Built: 1840
- NRHP reference No.: 84000741
- Added to NRHP: November 15, 1984

The Gale-Bancroft House is a historic house on Brook Road in Plainfield, Vermont. Built about 1840, it is one of the significant number of period brick houses in the town, unusually given the region's typical dependence on wood products for residential construction. It was listed on the National Register of Historic Places in 1984.

== Description and history ==
The Gale-Bancroft House stands to the southeast of the village center of Plainfield, on the north side of Brook Road just east of its crossing of Great Brook and west of Creamery Road. It is a modest single-story brick Cape style house, with a gabled roof. It is basically vernacular in style, with a hint of the Greek Revival in its gable returns. A single-story wood-frame ell extends to the east, set back from the front of the main block. The main block has a centered entrance, topped by a four-light transom window, and has a slightly off-center chimney. The interior of the house is relatively little altered since its construction, and has relatively plain vernacular molding. The main parlor has a tin roof that is a later addition. Standing east of the house is a mid-19th century barn of post-and-beam construction.

The exact date of construction of the house is not known. Based on analysis of its architecture, it was probably built after 1840 by S.B. Gale, one of a number of owners of the property between then and 1859. It is one of about a dozen brick houses in the town, that were clearly the work of a relatively small number of builders, but who are poorly documented. The house was used as an undertaker's facility for some years in the 19th century, at which time it was joined to the barn by an ell which has since been removed.

== See also ==
- National Register of Historic Places listings in Washington County, Vermont
