= Waterbury Center Methodist Church =

Historic church in Vermont, United States

- U.S. National Register of Historic Places
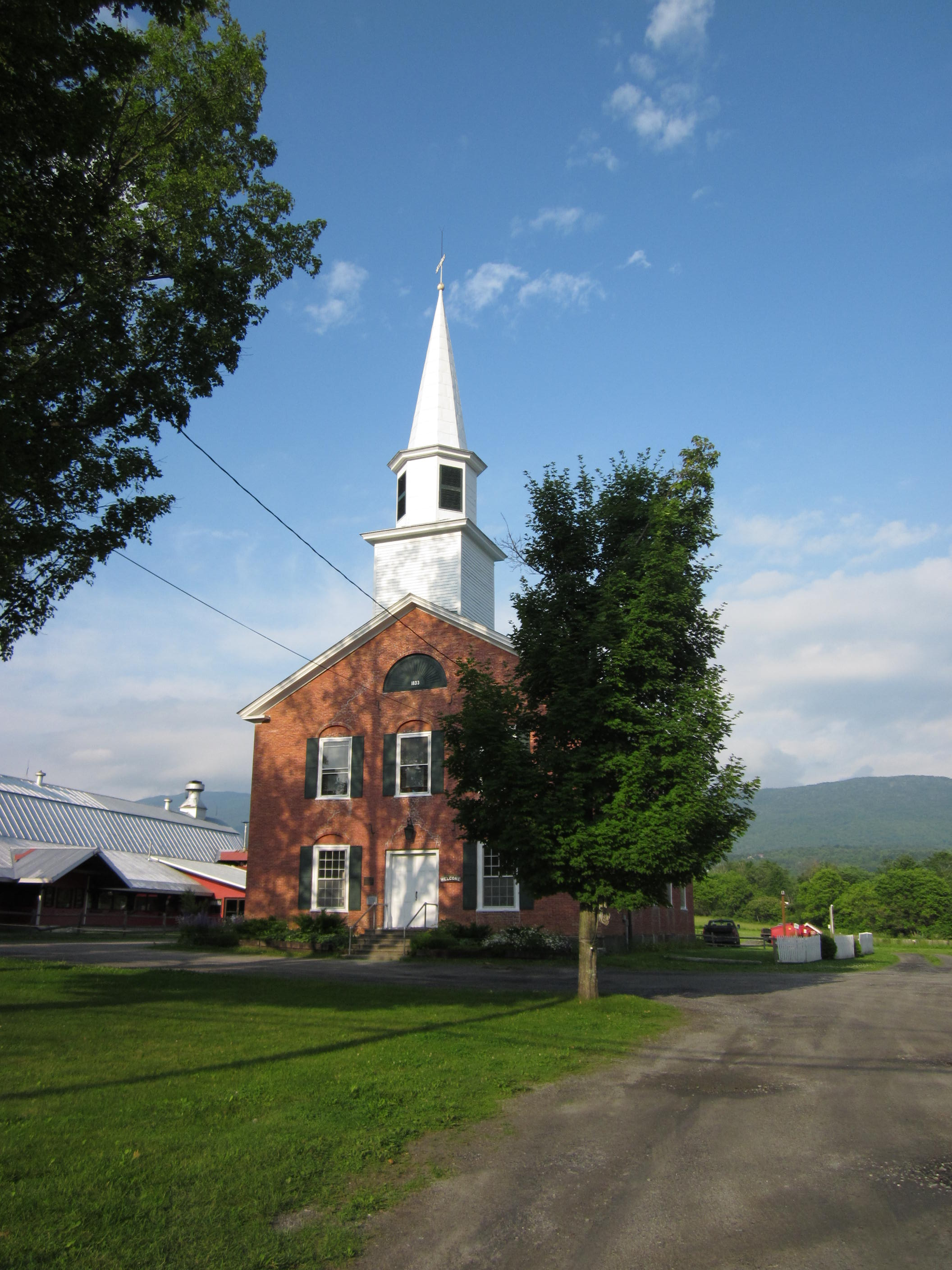

- Location within Vermont Location within the United States
- Location: 3582 Waterbury-Stowe Rd. (VT 100), Waterbury Center, Vermont
- Coordinates: 44°22′51″N 72°43′13″W
- Area: 0.5 acres (0.20 ha)
- Built: 1833
- Architectural style: Federal
- NRHP reference No.: 78000251
- Added to NRHP: January 9, 1978

The Waterbury Center Methodist Church, now the Waterbury Center Community Church, is a historic church building in Waterbury Center, Vermont. Built in 1833, it is a prominent visual landmark in the village, and a good local example of Federal period church architecture. It was listed on the National Register of Historic Places in 1978.

== Architecture and history ==
The Waterbury Center Community Church is in the village of Waterbury Center, on the east side of Vermont 100, a short way north of its junction with Hollow Road. It is a two-story brick building, with a gabled roof. A simple two-stage wood-frame tower rises from the roof ridge, with a plain square first stage, octagonal belfry stage, and steeple. The main facade is three bays wide, with windows set in rectangular openings topped by blind segmented-arch recesses. The main entrance is a double door, topped by a flat brick header. In the gable, there is a half-round fan. The interior originally was a single large space with gallery above, but a full second floor was built in 1858. Elements of the original box pews were used at that time to divide the lower level into a number of spaces, including a kitchen.

The church was completed in 1833, and was built out of brick similar to that used in other nearby period houses. Its stained glass windows were donated in 1894, and in 1919 the congregation merged with that of the local Baptists. The Waterbury Center Community Church was formally incorporated in 1963. The building is a well-preserved example rural Federal period architecture.

== See also ==
- National Register of Historic Places listings in Washington County, Vermont
