= National Register of Historic Places listings in Washington County, Vermont =

Location of Washington County in Vermont

This is a list of the National Register of Historic Places listings in Washington County, Vermont.

This is intended to be a complete list of the properties and districts on the National Register of Historic Places in Washington County, Vermont, United States. Latitude and longitude coordinates are provided for many National Register properties and districts; these locations may be seen together in a map.

There are 75 properties and districts listed on the National Register in the county, including 2 National Historic Landmarks.

This National Park Service list is complete through NPS recent listings posted June 6, 2026.

Contents: Counties in Vermont
Addison - Bennington - Caledonia - Chittenden - Essex - Franklin - Grand Isle - Lamoille - Orange - Orleans - Rutland - Washington - Windham - Windsor

== Current listings ==
	Name on the Register	Image	Date listed	Location	City or town	Description
1	Adamant Village Historic District		May 8, 2023 (#100008954)	Haggett, Martin, Quarry, and Adamant Rds., Center St. 44°19′45″N 72°30′11″W	Calais	
2	Aldrich Public Library	Aldrich Public Library	January 5, 2015 (#15000961)	6 Washington St. 44°11′51″N 72°30′04″W	Barre	
3	Allenwood Farm	Allenwood Farm	December 22, 1983 (#83004229)	U.S. Route 2; 44°16′42″N 72°26′02″W	Plainfield	
4	Athenwood and Thomas W. Wood Studio	Athenwood and Thomas W. Wood Studio	June 13, 1974 (#74000259)	41 and 39 Northfield St. 44°15′21″N 72°34′47″W	Montpelier	
5	Barre City Hall and Opera House	Barre City Hall and Opera House	January 18, 1973 (#73000198)	12 N. Main St. 44°11′48″N 72°30′10″W	Barre City	
6	Barre Downtown Historic District	Barre Downtown Historic District	September 4, 1979 (#79000227)	United States Route 302; 44°11′50″N 72°30′09″W	Barre City	
7	Beck and Beck Granite Shed	Beck and Beck Granite Shed	September 29, 2011 (#11000714)	30 Granite St. 44°11′58″N 72°30′23″W	Barre City	
8	Bridge 31	Bridge 31	August 9, 2006 (#06000703)	Winooski St. 44°20′21″N 72°45′51″W	Waterbury	
9	Bridge No. 27	Bridge No. 27	January 11, 2006 (#05001523)	Town Highway 61, Lover's Ln. 44°11′15″N 72°38′27″W	Berlin	
10	Center Road Culvert	Center Road Culvert	March 2, 2020 (#100005024)	Center Rd. 44°17′10″N 72°31′18″W	East Montpelier	
11	Central Vermont Railway Depot	Central Vermont Railway Depot	April 1, 1975 (#75000145)	Western end of Depot Sq. 44°08′55″N 72°39′30″W	Northfield	
12	Coburn Covered Bridge	Coburn Covered Bridge	October 9, 1974 (#74000260)	Northeast of East Montpelier between Vermont Route 14 and U.S. Route 2, over the Winooski River; 44°16′51″N 72°27′18″W	East Montpelier	
13	Colby Mansion	Colby Mansion	September 10, 1979 (#79000228)	VT 100; 44°20′59″N 72°44′35″W	Waterbury	
14	College Hall	College Hall	April 23, 1975 (#75000146)	Vermont College campus, Ridge St. 44°15′19″N 72°34′04″W	Montpelier	
15	Currier Park Historic District	Currier Park Historic District	September 27, 1990 (#90001454)	Properties bordering Currier Park on Park, North, East and Academy Sts. and adjacent properties on Averill and Cliff Sts; 44°11′50″N 72°29′52″W	Barre City	
16	Parley Davis House	Parley Davis House	September 18, 1989 (#89000242)	Center Road; 44°17′01″N 72°31′47″W	East Montpelier	
17	East Calais Historic District	East Calais Historic District	September 24, 2020 (#100005618)	VT 14, Marshfield Rd., Batten Rd., Back St., and Moscow Woods Rd. 44°21′56″N 72°25′51″W	Calais	
18	East Village Meetinghouse	East Village Meetinghouse	June 30, 1980 (#80000341)	US 2 and VT 14; 44°16′18″N 72°29′12″W	East Montpelier	
19	Gale-Bancroft House	Gale-Bancroft House	November 15, 1984 (#84000741)	Brook Rd. 44°16′31″N 72°25′23″W	Plainfield	
20	Goddard College Greatwood Campus	Goddard College Greatwood Campus	March 7, 1996 (#96000253)	Junction of U.S. Route 2 and Vermont Route 214; 44°16′43″N 72°26′04″W	Plainfield	
21	Great Eddy Covered Bridge	Great Eddy Covered Bridge	September 6, 1974 (#74000261)	Bridge St., east of Vermont Route 100 over Mad River; 44°11′22″N 72°49′26″W	Waitsfield	Also known as the Waitsfield Village Covered Bridge.
22	Green Mountain Seminary	Green Mountain Seminary	January 30, 1978 (#78000245)	Hollow Rd. 44°22′39″N 72°43′05″W	Waterbury Center	
23	Italian Baptist Church	Italian Baptist Church	April 23, 1975 (#75000147)	10 N. Brook St. 44°12′13″N 72°30′30″W	Barre City	
24	Jones Brothers Granite Shed	Jones Brothers Granite Shed	April 26, 2002 (#02000413)	7 Jones Bros. Way; 44°12′42″N 72°31′15″W	Barre City	Now the Vermont Granite Museum.
25	Jones-Pestle Farmstead	Jones-Pestle Farmstead	September 8, 2015 (#15000582)	339 Bridge St. 44°11′11″N 72°49′11″W	Waitsfield	
26	Joslin Farm	Joslin Farm	October 27, 1988 (#88002058)	E. Warren Rd., 1.5 mi (2.4 km) east of junction with Bridge St. 44°10′07″N 72°48′36″W	Waitsfield	
27	Kents Corner Historic District	Kents Corner Historic District	May 8, 1973 (#73000199)	Kent's Corner; also Kent Hill, Old West Church, Robinson Cemetery, Fowler, and Bliss Pond Roads; 44°21′54″N 72°29′18″W	Calais	Second set of addresses represents a boundary increase June 30, 2006
28	Lareau Farmstead	Lareau Farmstead	December 27, 2016 (#16000919)	48 Lareau Rd. 44°10′21″N 72°50′03″W	Waitsfield	
29	Chauncey B. Leonard House	Chauncey B. Leonard House	March 9, 1995 (#95000176)	Northern side of Shed Rd., about 0.2 mi (0.32 km) west of Scott Hill Rd. 44°12′39″N 72°34′46″W	Berlin	
30	Mad River Glen Ski Area Historic District	Mad River Glen Ski Area Historic District	July 5, 2012 (#12000409)	VT 17 (McCullough Turnpike); 44°12′07″N 72°55′02″W	Fayston	Extends into Buels Gore in Chittenden County
31	Lower Cox Brook Covered Bridge	Lower Cox Brook Covered Bridge	October 15, 1974 (#74000262)	Off Vermont Route 12; 44°10′21″N 72°39′12″W	Northfield Falls	
32	Mad River Valley Rural Historic District	Mad River Valley Rural Historic District	August 5, 1994 (#94000836)	Roughly along Vermont Routes 100 and 100B from Waitsfield to Moretown and parts of North and River Rds. 44°13′16″N 72°47′29″W	Moretown and Waitsfield	
33	Martin Covered Bridge	Martin Covered Bridge	October 9, 1974 (#74000358)	Northeast of Plainfield, over the Winooski River off US 2; 44°17′07″N 72°24′48″W	Marshfield	
34	Mayo Building	Mayo Building	July 14, 1983 (#83003222)	Main and East Sts. 44°08′54″N 72°39′22″W	Northfield	
35	McLaughlin Farm	McLaughlin Farm	January 22, 1996 (#95001556)	Town Highway 17 (Bragg Hill Rd.); 44°11′37″N 72°50′45″W	Fayston	Now known as Knoll Farm.
36	Middlesex-Winooski River Bridge	Middlesex-Winooski River Bridge	November 14, 1991 (#91001610)	U.S. Route 2 over the Winooski River; 44°18′22″N 72°41′48″W	Middlesex and Moretown	Historic bridge replaced in 2010.
37	Mill Village Historic District	Mill Village Historic District	June 12, 1979 (#79000229)	Roughly bounded by Vermont Route 100, Interstate 89, and Stowe St. 44°20′35″N 72°44′52″W	Waterbury	
38	Montpelier Historic District	Montpelier Historic District	November 3, 1978 (#78000246)	U.S. Route 2 and Vermont Route 12; also 70–101 E. State St. and 1 West St.; also Monsignor Crosby Ave., Peck Place, Tower Loop Rd., Cross, Downing, Franklin & Wilder Sts. 44°15′41″N 72°34′37″W	Montpelier	Second and third sets of addresses represents boundary increases approved April 17, 1989 and February 20, 2018.
39	National Clothespin Factory	National Clothespin Factory	December 16, 2005 (#05001422)	One Granite St. 44°15′08″N 72°34′16″W	Montpelier	Was the last manufacturer of wooden clothespins in the US; building now houses martial arts studios and other businesses; see also Grave of Jack Crowell
40	Nichols House	Nichols House	January 31, 1978 (#78000247)	Southwest of East Barre off Vermont Route 110; 44°08′59″N 72°27′31″W	East Barre	
41	North Calais Village Historic District	North Calais Village Historic District	September 24, 2010 (#10000772)	N. Calais Rd., Foster Hill Rd., Upper Rd., Moscow Hills Rd., G.A.R. Rd. 44°23′27″N 72°26′37″W	Calais	
42	Northfield Falls Covered Bridge	Northfield Falls Covered Bridge	August 13, 1974 (#74000263)	North of Northfield off Vermont Route 12, over Dog River; 44°10′20″N 72°39′18″W	Northfield	
43	Northfield Graded School	Northfield Graded School	June 11, 2024 (#100010436)	168 North Main Street; 44°09′04″N 72°39′19″W	Northfield	
44	Old Red Mill	Old Red Mill	October 20, 1977 (#77000102)	Vermont Route 12; 44°07′07″N 72°39′27″W	South Northfield	
45	Old West Church	Old West Church	May 8, 1973 (#73000200)	0.8 mi (1.3 km) south of Kent's Corner; 44°21′31″N 72°29′37″W	Calais	
46	Pine Brook Covered Bridge	Pine Brook Covered Bridge	June 13, 1974 (#74000264)	Northeast of Waitsfield over Pine Brook; 44°12′21″N 72°47′32″W	Waitsfield	
47	Plainfield Village Historic District	Plainfield Village Historic District	February 3, 1983 (#83003223)	High, School, Main and Water Sts., and Brook Rd. 44°16′43″N 72°25′32″W	Plainfield and Marshfield	
48	Reynolds House	Reynolds House	August 5, 2020 (#100005433)	102 South Main St. 44°11′29″N 72°29′57″W	Barre	
49	Roxbury Fish Hatchery	Roxbury Fish Hatchery	March 24, 1994 (#94000177)	Western side of Vermont Route 12A, about 1 mile (1.6 km) south of Roxbury; 44°03′46″N 72°44′38″W	Roxbury	Vermont Fish and Wildlife Department's Roxbury Fish Culture Station, the first fish culture station in Vermont, built in 1891
50	Scampini Block	Scampini Block	March 13, 2007 (#07000160)	289 N. Main St. 44°12′07″N 72°30′16″W	Barre City	
51	Slaughter House Covered Bridge	Slaughter House Covered Bridge	June 13, 1974 (#74000265)	North of Northfield off Vermont Route 12 over Dog River; 44°10′07″N 72°39′17″W	Northfield	
52	E. L. Smith Roundhouse Granite Shed	E. L. Smith Roundhouse Granite Shed	September 26, 2011 (#11000704)	23 Burnham Meadows; 44°11′51″N 72°30′19″W	Barre City	
53	Socialist Labor Party Hall	Socialist Labor Party Hall	October 22, 1998 (#98001267)	46 Granite St. 44°11′54″N 72°30′27″W	Barre City	
54	Stony Brook Covered Bridge	Stony Brook Covered Bridge	November 20, 1974 (#74000266)	Southwest of Northfield off Vermont Route 12A, over Stony Brook; 44°07′16″N 72°41′25″W	Northfield	
55	Trow & Holden Stone Tool Manufacturing Complex	Trow & Holden Stone Tool Manufacturing Complex	September 23, 2024 (#100010824)	45 South Main Street; 44°11′38″N 72°30′04″W	Barre City	
56	Joshua Twing Gristmill	Joshua Twing Gristmill	December 29, 1978 (#78000248)	450 N. Main St. 44°12′18″N 72°30′41″W	Barre City	
57	Union Co-operative Store Bakery	Union Co-operative Store Bakery	November 13, 2003 (#03001166)	46½ Granite St. 44°11′55″N 72°30′24″W	Barre City	
58	Union Meetinghouse	Union Meetinghouse	June 30, 1980 (#80000342)	Center Rd. 44°17′00″N 72°31′39″W	East Montpelier	
59	Upper Cox Brook Covered Bridge	Upper Cox Brook Covered Bridge	October 1, 1974 (#74000267)	North of Northfield off Vermont Route 12 over Cox Brook; 44°10′25″N 72°39′20″W	Northfield	
60	Vermont State Hospital Historic District	Vermont State Hospital Historic District	November 8, 2016 (#16000765)	Horseshoe & State Drs., Park Row; 44°19′55″N 72°45′14″W	Waterbury	
61	Vermont Statehouse	Vermont Statehouse	December 30, 1970 (#70000739)	State St. 44°15′44″N 72°34′51″W	Montpelier	
62	Waitsfield Common Historic District	Waitsfield Common Historic District	November 8, 2001 (#01001227)	Joslin Hill Rd., North Rd., East Rd., and Common Rd. 44°11′16″N 72°47′47″W	Waitsfield	
63	Waitsfield Village Historic District	Waitsfield Village Historic District	August 11, 1983 (#83003224)	Vermont Route 100 and Bridge St. 44°11′26″N 72°49′22″W	Waitsfield	
64	Ward 5 School		January 2, 2026 (#100012475)	4 Humbert Street; 44°12′08″N 72°30′45″W	Barre City	
65	Warren Covered Bridge	Warren Covered Bridge	August 7, 1974 (#74000269)	Off Vermont Route 100, over the Mad River; 44°06′40″N 72°51′26″W	Warren	
66	Warren Village Historic District	Warren Village Historic District	November 20, 1992 (#92001532)	Along Town Highways 1, 4, 16 and 17; 44°06′49″N 72°51′24″W	Warren	
67	Waterbury Center Methodist Church	Waterbury Center Methodist Church	January 9, 1978 (#78000251)	Vermont Route 100; 44°22′51″N 72°43′13″W	Waterbury Center	
68	Waterbury Village Historic District	Waterbury Village Historic District	August 24, 1978 (#78000249)	U.S. Route 2; also North Main, Union, Winooski Sts., Adams Ct., Stowe St., Bidwell Ln., Railroad St., Locust Terr., Swazey Ct., High St., Turner Ct., Hill, South Main, and Elm Sts., Parker Ct., Foundry and, Randall Sts., Park Row, Rotarian Pl., Park St., Moody Ct. 44°20′06″N 72°45′17″W	Waterbury	Boundary changes approved September 29, 2021.
69	Wheelock Law Office	Wheelock Law Office	June 18, 1975 (#75000148)	135 N. Main St. 44°11′53″N 72°30′13″W	Barre City	
70	Wiswell House		June 8, 2003 (#100009035)	3296 Main St. 44°24′18″N 72°18′32″W	Cabot	
71	Theodore Wood House	Theodore Wood House	February 10, 2005 (#05000037)	1420 Hollister Hill Rd. 44°18′07″N 72°24′51″W	Marshfield	
72	Woodbury Graded School	Woodbury Graded School	September 30, 1993 (#93001008)	Junction of Town Highway 22 and Vermont Route 14; 44°26′24″N 72°24′59″W	Woodbury	
73	Woodbury Town Hall	Woodbury Town Hall	March 31, 1995 (#95000296)	Vermont Route 14; 44°26′26″N 72°24′57″W	Woodbury	
74	Worcester Town Hall	Worcester Town Hall	November 9, 2005 (#05001234)	12 Worcester Village Rd. 44°22′22″N 72°33′00″W	Worcester	
75	Worcester Village School	Worcester Village School	November 9, 2005 (#05001235)	17 Calais Rd. 44°22′21″N 72°32′55″W	Worcester	

== See also ==
- List of National Historic Landmarks in Vermont
- National Register of Historic Places listings in Vermont
