= Currier Park Historic District =

Historic district in Vermont, United States

- U.S. National Register of Historic Places
- U.S. Historic district
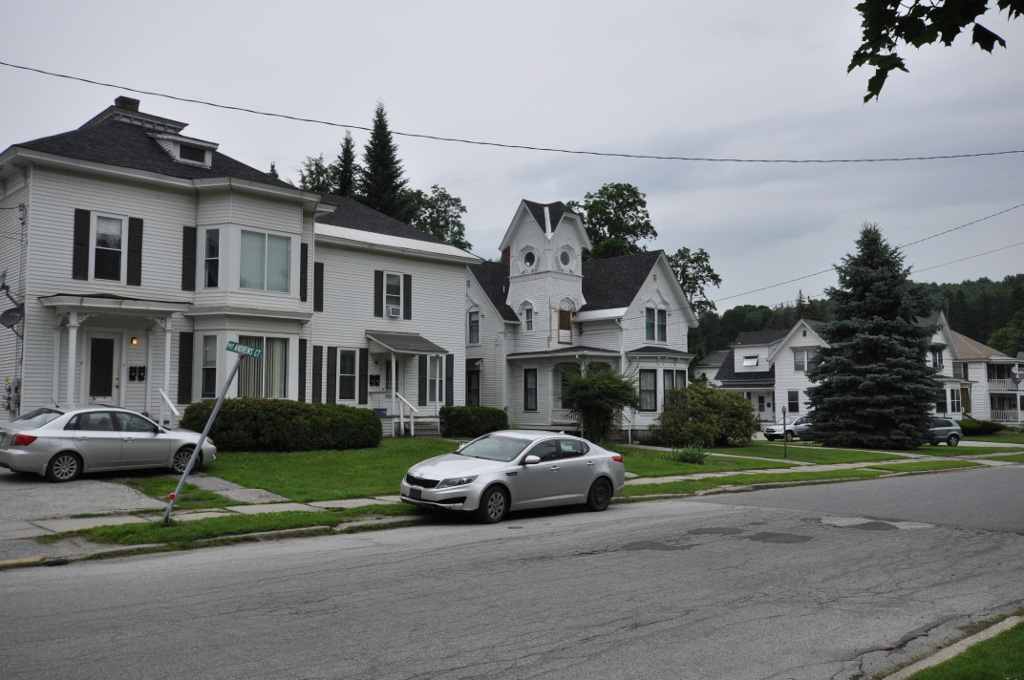

- Location within Vermont Location within the United States
- Location: Properties bordering Currier Park on Park, North, East and Academy Sts. and adjacent properties on Averill and Cliff Sts, Barre, Vermont
- Coordinates: 44°11′50″N 72°29′52″W
- Area: 10 acres (4.0 ha)
- Built: 1883
- Architectural style: Colonial Revival, Italianate, Queen Anne
- NRHP reference No.: 90001454
- Added to NRHP: September 27, 1990

The Currier Park Historic District encompasses a historic late 19th-century affluent residential area of the city of Barre, Vermont. Centered around Currier Park, a rectangular park laid out in 1883 just east of the city's downtown, are a collection of a high quality predominantly Italianate and Queen Anne Victorian residences. The district was listed on the National Register of Historic Places in 1990.

== Description and history ==
The city of Barre rose in the last quarter of the 19th century as a major center of the granite quarrying and processing industry. It experienced rapid growth, resulting in the development of its downtown, and the need for workers increased development pressures on adjacent rural areas. To the east of its downtown was a farm property owned by Stedman Chubb, a stonemason who had purchased it from his father-in-law, Richard Carrier, in 1881. First used by Chubb as a dairy farm, he began laying out Currier Park in 1883. Chubb donated the park to the city in 1883; it was first named Chubb Park in his honor, but was later renamed for his father-in-law. The first houses were built facing the park about 1885, and the area was completely developed by 1905.

The historic district consists of Currier Park and all of the buildings facing it on East, North, Park, and Academy Streets. It extends a bit further from the park along Park, East, and Academy, and also includes abutting properties on the adjacent Averill, Cliff, and Mount Streets. The district directly abuts the Barre Downtown Historic District, which lies to the west and south. The majority of main buildings in the district are in a vernacular Italianate style, although a large minority of the 38 buildings are Queen Anne in style. There are four Colonial Revival houses in the district, built in the early 20th century. The park is rectangular in shape, with a star-shaped path layout and grassy areas dotted with trees.

== See also ==
- National Register of Historic Places listings in Washington County, Vermont
