= Waitsfield Village Historic District =

Historic district in Vermont, United States

- U.S. National Register of Historic Places
- U.S. Historic district
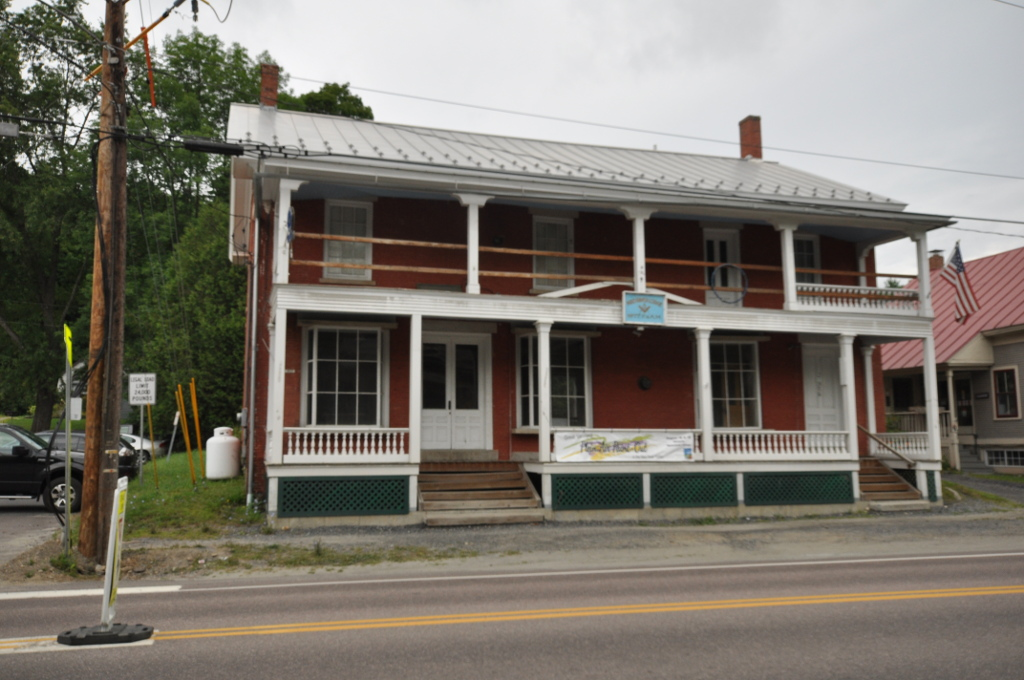

- Location within Vermont Location within the United States
- Location: VT 100 and Bridge St., Waitsfield, Vermont
- Coordinates: 44°11′26″N 72°49′22″W
- Area: 70 acres (28 ha)
- Built: 1817
- Architectural style: Late 19th And 20th Century Revivals, Federal, Greek Revival
- NRHP reference No.: 83003224
- Added to NRHP: August 11, 1983

The Waitsfield Village Historic District encompasses much of the main village center of Waitsfield, Vermont. Extending along Vermont Route 100 on either side of Bridge Street, it is a well-preserved example of a 19th-century village, with only a few sympathetic 20th-century additions. It was listed on the National Register of Historic Places in 1983.

== Description and history ==
The town of Waitsfield was chartered in 1782 and settled by Benjamin Wait. Its early civic and commercial centers were at Waitsfield Common, and near Wait's house, which was located on a rise west of the present village. A road (now roughly Bridge Street), ran between the two, and a bridge spanned the Mad River on the site of the present Great Eddy Covered Bridge as early as 1797. In 1817, the present village center was essentially laid out by members of the Richardson family, who established a store at the crossroads of Bridge Street and what is now VT 100, and built mills to harness the river's water power. The village never achieved significant prominence in manufacturing, however, due to the lack of any nearby railroad connection, and development has been limited since the turn of the 20th century.

The historic district extends north, south, and east from the junction of Route 100 and Bridge Street. Its northern boundary is at Loop Road, and its southern boundary is at a geographic pinching point, where Route 100 passes between a steep rise on the west and the Mad River to the east. To the east, it extends across the Mad River (including the Great Eddy bridge, Vermont's oldest active covered bridge) to a point where the road crosses a dry branch of the river. Most of the buildings are wood-frame structures; there are six brick buildings. The most significant 20th-century building is the Joslin Library, prominently located at the central junction.

== See also ==
- National Register of Historic Places listings in Washington County, Vermont
