= Knoll Farm =

- McLaughlin Farm
- U.S. National Register of Historic Places
- U.S. Historic district
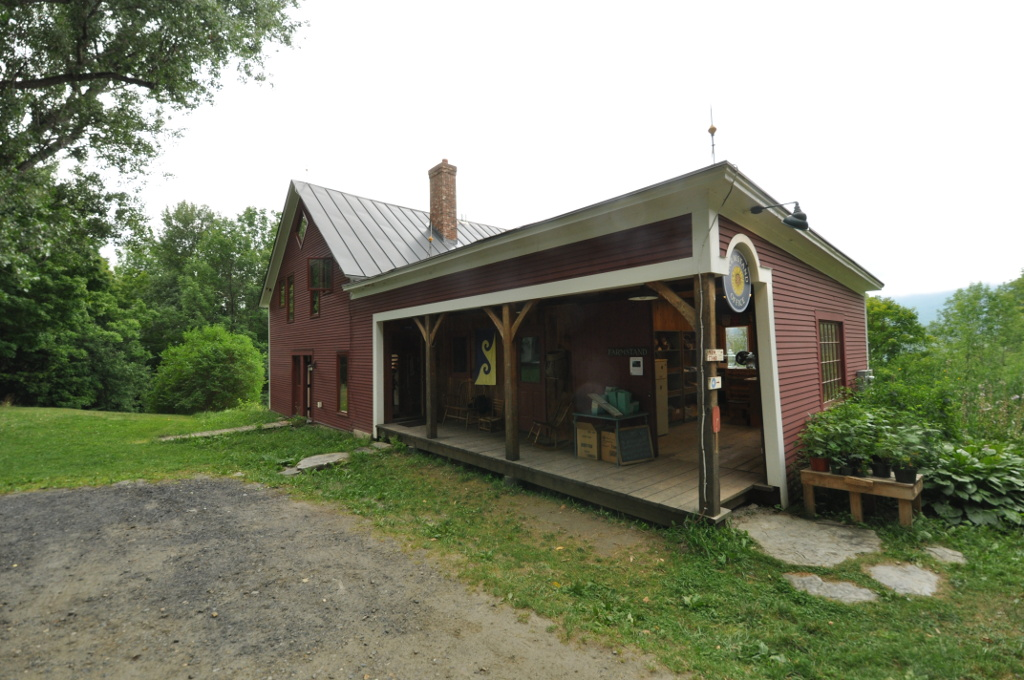

- Location within Vermont Location within the United States
- Location: 700 Bragg Hill Rd., Fayston, Vermont
- Coordinates: 44°11′37″N 72°50′45″W
- Area: 140 acres (57 ha)
- Built: 1904
- Built by: Marshall, Everett
- Architectural style: Italianate
- MPS: Agricultural Resources of Vermont MPS
- NRHP reference No.: 95001556
- Added to NRHP: January 22, 1996

Knoll Farm, also formerly known as McLaughlin Farm, is a historic farm property at 700 Bragg Hill Road in Fayston, Vermont. The farm has seen agricultural use since 1804, and the patterns of use are evident in the surviving farm buildings and landscape. The property, is still actively farmed and also used as a retreat center and is listed on the National Register of Historic Places in 1996.

== Description and history ==
Knoll Farm is located in an upland area above the village of Fayston, and is bounded on its west by Bragg Hill Road. The farm property consists of about 140 acres (57 ha), with a broad open area extending east from the farm complex, which stands near Bragg Hill Road. The eastern and northern portions of the property are a steeper hillside area, historically used for timber production, is now the home for a nationally respected retreat center. The open areas of the farm are a combination of pasture, hay fields, and gardens. The farmstead is separated from the road by an old alignment of Bragg Hill Road, which now serves as a parking area for farm visitors. The farmstead complex includes a 1904 wood-frame farmhouse, a mid-to-late 19th century bank barn set between the old and new alignments of the road, and a second c. 1880 barn east of the house that was moved to this site from the valley below in 1923.

This property was first farmed in the early 19th century by Rufus Barrett. It was considered a favorable property due to its extensive southern exposure, which provided for early snow melt and a longer growing season. Unlike larger farm properties in the Mad River below, its proprietors did not specialize, engaging in a diverse variety of farming activities. It was owned between 1874 and 1935 by three generations of the McLaughlin family, and most of its buildings date to their period of ownership. Farming for profit ended on the property with the McLaughlin's sale of the property in 1935, at which time it became an inn serving the automobile tourist trade. Low-level agricultural activities have continued on the property since then, including by recent ownership, which raises sheep and blueberries while also operating a small conference center on the site.

Knoll Farm was purchased in 1957 by Ann Day and family who stewarded the property for 50 years and connected the farm to a new generation of social and environmental activism. In the 1980s Ann began traveling to Nicaragua through the American Friends Service Committee and made Knoll Farm a place of refuge for people fleeing the civil war for asylum in Canada. Ann would also honor the nature and history of Knoll Farm by making one of the earliest conservation agreements to permanently protect the land in 1982 with the Vermont Land Trust. In 2001, the current owners of Knoll Farm, Peter Forbes, Helen Whybrow and their family, purchased the farm from Ann Day and Vermont Land Trust after being chosen in a competition to bring a new vision to the farm. Active farming returned to Knoll Farm then as did a new generation of “natural-build” buildings which reflect the new owner's commitment to environmental sustainability and education. In 2004, Forbes and Whybrow created Center for Whole Communities, a nonprofit leadership organization, which gathered thousands of social justice and environmental activists and leaders at the farm for a period of 12 years. In 2008, the farm returned to running entirely on wood and sun, a source of energy for the farm that had been replaced by fossil fuels in the 1940s. Today, Knoll Farm is a model working farm specializing in organic fruit production, Icelandic sheep, solar energy production and being a place of refuge for community leaders from around the United States.

== See also ==
- National Register of Historic Places listings in Washington County, Vermont
