= Theodore Wood House =

Historic house in Vermont, United States

- U.S. National Register of Historic Places
- Location within Vermont Location within the United States
- Location: 1420 Hollister Hill Rd., Marshfield, Vermont
- Coordinates: 44°18′7″N 72°24′51″W
- Area: 2 acres (0.81 ha)
- Built: 1887
- Architect: Wood, Chester James
- Architectural style: Second Empire
- NRHP reference No.: 05000037
- Added to NRHP: February 10, 2005

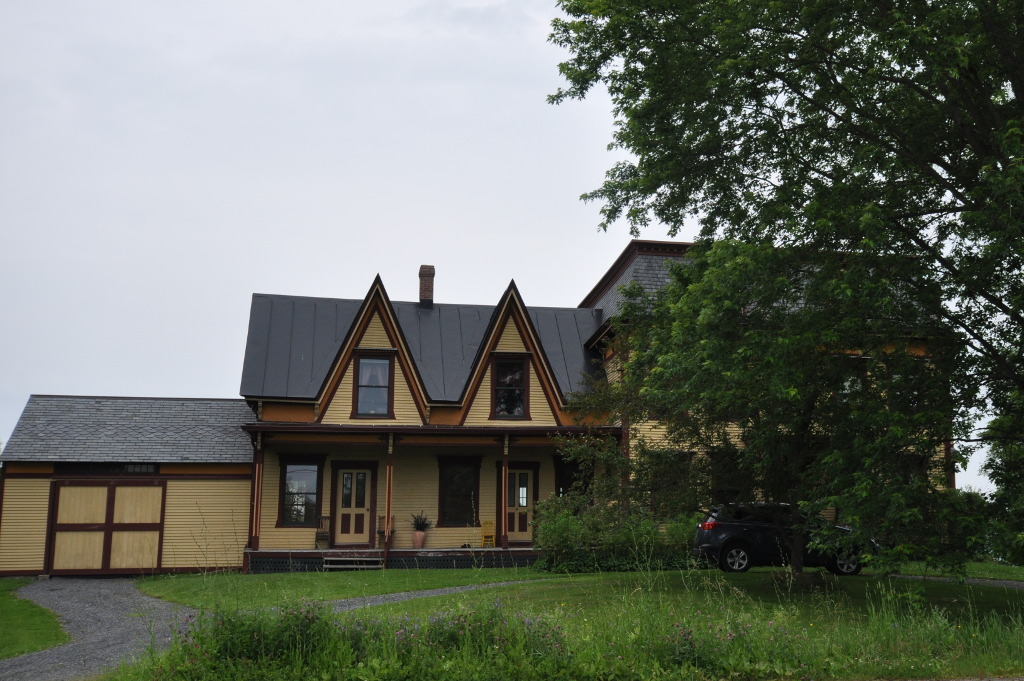
MarshfieldVT TheodoreWoodHouse.jpg

The Theodore Wood House is a historic house at 1420 Hollister Hill Road in Marshfield, Vermont. Built about 1887, it is the only known surviving work of Chester James Wood, a local builder of some reputation, and is the town's only significant surviving example of Second Empire architecture. It was listed on the National Register of Historic Places in 2005.

== Description and history ==
The Theodore Wood House sits on a gentle knoll on Hollister Hill Road in Marshfield, Vermont in a pastoral setting of unpaved roads. Built in 1885, the residence fronts to the south, seventy-five feet from Hollister Hill Road at its intersection with Eaton Cemetery Road. with sweeping views of open pastures and distant mountain views in all directions.

The int

== See also ==
- National Register of Historic Places listings in Washington County, Vermont
