= Union Co-operative Store Bakery =

- U.S. National Register of Historic Places
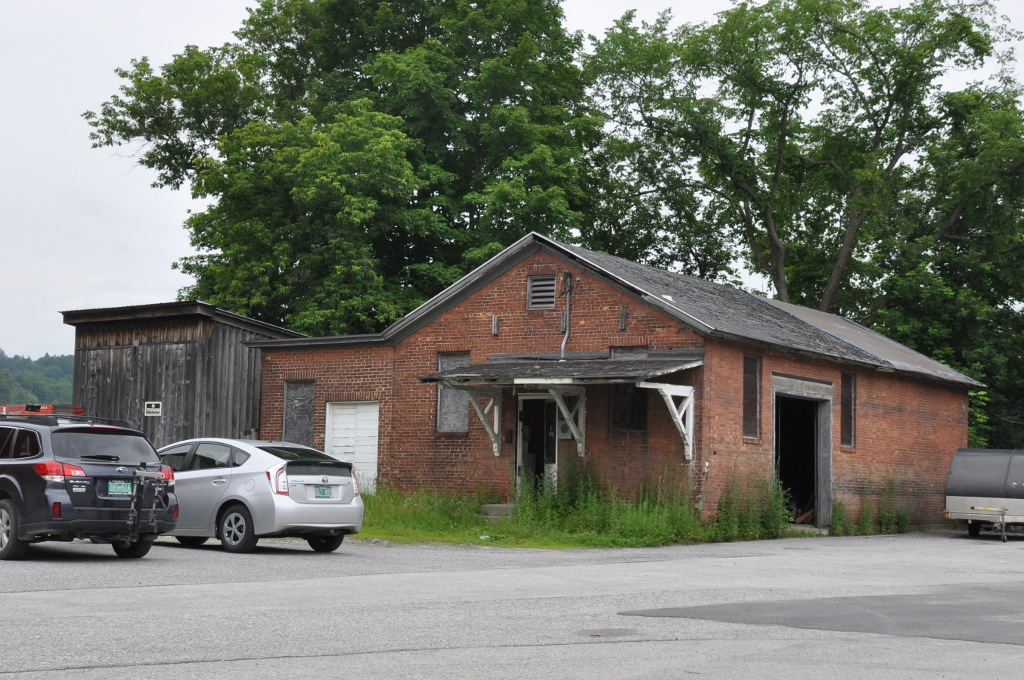

- Location within Vermont Location within the United States
- Location: 46 1/2 Granite St., Barre, Vermont
- Coordinates: 44°11′55″N 72°30′26″W
- Area: less than one acre
- Built: 1913
- NRHP reference No.: 03001166
- Added to NRHP: November 13, 2003

The Union Co-operative Store Bakery is a historic commercial building at 46 1/2 Granite Street in the city of Barre, Vermont, USA.

== Description and history ==
The former Union Co-operative Store Bakery building stands at the back of the parking lot of the Socialist Labor Party Hall on the east side of Granite Street, a short way off Barre's Main Street business district. It is a vernacular single-story brick building, with a gabled roof. The front (west-facing) facade has a pair of window openings (now boarded over) flanking a doorway, with the door and right window sheltered by a shed-roof hood supported by large knee brackets. The south facade has an asymmetrically placed grouping of window openings flanking a large opening with a garage door. A small flat-roofed brick addition extends north, with a further wood-frame shed-roofed addition beyond that.

The main portion of the building was built in 1913, and was an extension of the cooperative grocery store operated out of the Labor Party hall. The bakery was established to meet a growing demand among the city's Italian immigrants for traditional bakery products. Both the bakery and the Labor Party were significant institutions of this community. The bakery building was flooded during Vermont's devastating 1927 floods, and the bakery only operated for two years after that. It served as a training ground for an entire generation of the city's bakers. It was briefly used by a private bakery between 1936 and 1940, and has largely been used for storage since then. None of its baking equipment has survived.

== See also ==
- National Register of Historic Places listings in Washington County, Vermont
