= Old Red Mill =

- U.S. National Register of Historic Places
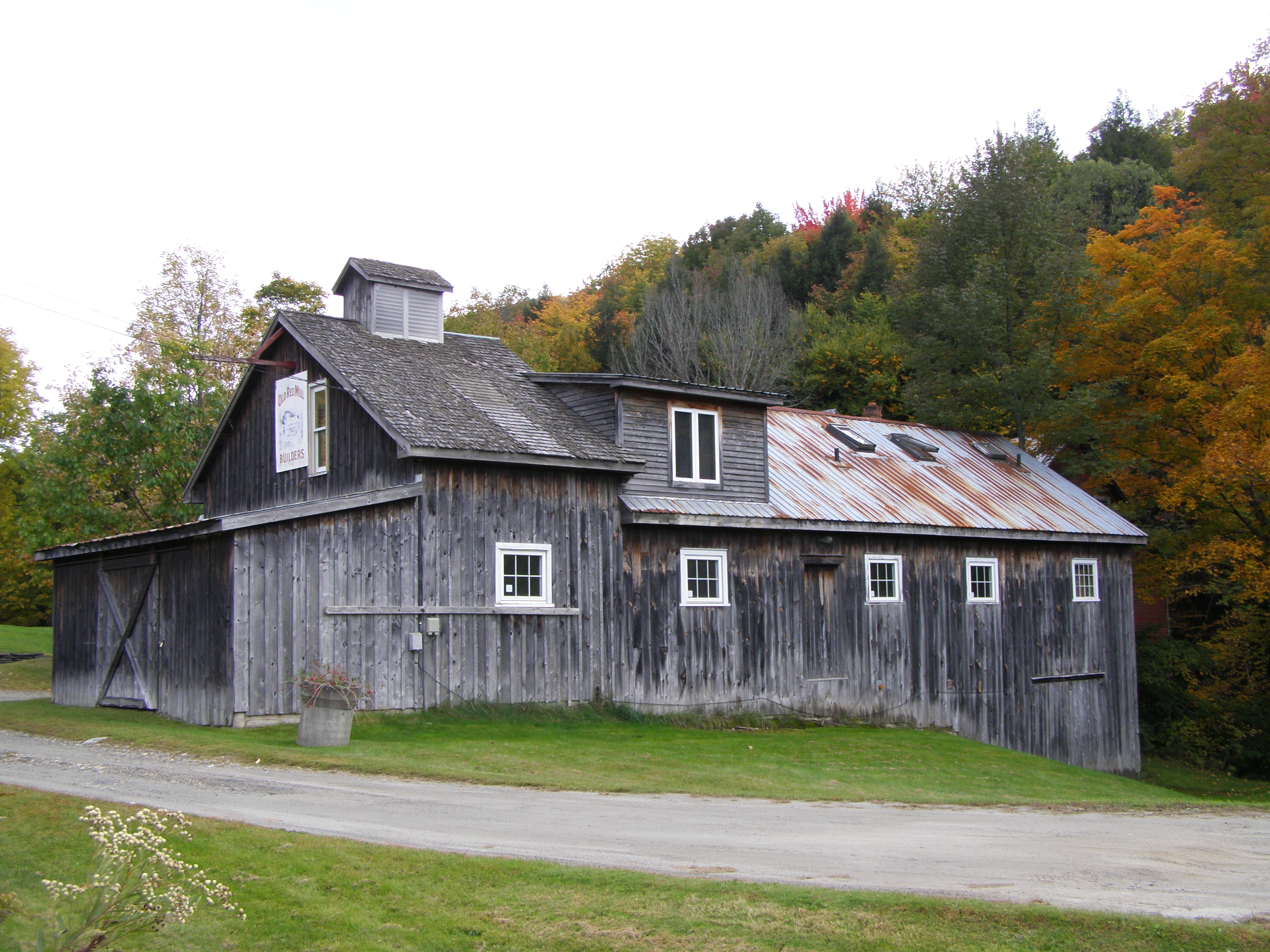

- Location within Vermont Location within the United States
- Location: VT 12, Northfield, Vermont
- Coordinates: 44°7′7″N 72°39′27″W
- Area: less than one acre
- Built: 1897
- NRHP reference No.: 77000102
- Added to NRHP: October 20, 1977

The Old Red Mill is a historic mill complex at Vermont Route 12 and Lovers Lane in southern Northfield, Vermont. Built in 1898, the building houses a nearly intact water-powered grain grinding mechanism from the period. It was listed on the National Register of Historic Places in 1977.

== Description and history ==
The Old Red Mill stands at the northern edge of the village of South Northfield, at the southwest corner of Vermont Route 12 with Lovers Lane. It is set between Route 12 and Sunny Brook, a branch of the Dog River which was the source of its power. It is a single-story wood-frame structure, with a gabled roof and vertical board siding. It is set on a foundation of slate, and has two additions extending away from the brook and toward the road. The first has a higher gabled roof and is capped by a cupola, while the second has a shed roof. The mill received its water power via a concrete dam and penstock, which direct water into a metal turbine. The turbine powers the main drive shaft, from which power was transferred to other devices via leather or rubberized canvas belts. Surviving equipment includes conveyor belts and grain cleaning and milling equipment.

Mills have existed on this site since at least the early 19th century. This mill was built as a replacement for one that burned in 1896 by M.W. Partch in 1897–98. The gristmill operated until the mid-1940s, and was joined in the building by a cider mill in the 1930s. A number of auxiliary outbuildings, primarily for the storage of grain, have been demolished.

== See also ==
- National Register of Historic Places listings in Washington County, Vermont
