= Joshua Twing Gristmill =

- U.S. National Register of Historic Places
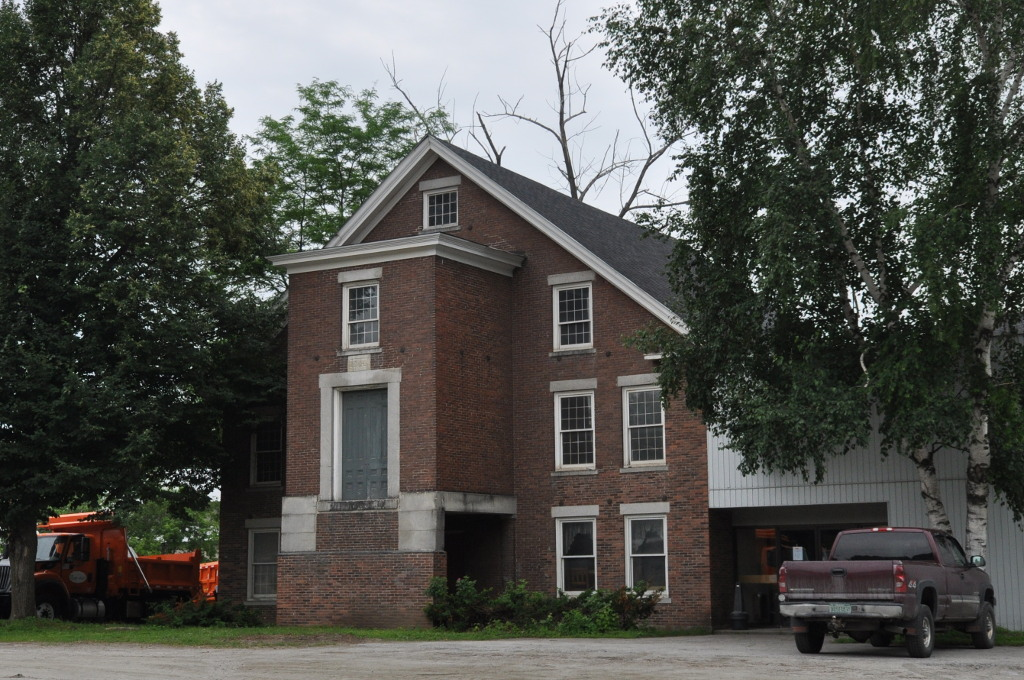

- Location within Vermont Location within the United States
- Location: 450 N. Main St., Barre, Vermont
- Coordinates: 44°12′18″N 72°30′41″W
- Area: 1 acre (0.40 ha)
- Built: 1844
- Built by: Twing, Joshua
- Architectural style: Greek Revival
- NRHP reference No.: 78000248
- Added to NRHP: December 29, 1978

The Joshua Twing Gristmill is a historic industrial facility at 450 North Main Street in the city of Barre, Vermont. Built in 1844, it is a remarkably high-style example of Greek Revival architecture for an essentially utilitarian industrial structure. Joshua Twing, its builder, was engaged for many years in a variety of industrial pursuits, primarily considered with engineering improvements in water wheels and turbines. The building was listed on the National Register of Historic Places in 1978.

== Description and history ==
The Joshua Twing Gristmill is located north of downtown Barre, in an industrial area on the west side of North Main Street (United States Route 302) south of its junction with Berlin Street. It is set between the road and railroad tracks that parallel it and the Stevens Branch of the Winooski River. It is a 2-3/4 story brick building with a gabled roof. Windows are set in rectangular openings, with stone sills and lintels. Projecting from the center of the main facade is an unusual stair tower, whose ground level is fronted by a brick wall with stone headers, and is open at the sides, allowing a wagon to pass underneath the second level. A large entrance is set in a granite frame on the second level, and was originally accessed by stairs that have been removed. The interior of the stair tower includes trap doors to facilitate the movement of goods to the building's third level. The interior of the building has a number of high-style Greek Revival features, including a double-spiral staircase and marbleized columns.

Joshua Twing purchased this property in 1807, at which time a sawmill and gristmill stood on it. Over a period of decades, he built a series of mills and industrial structures on the property, of which this gristmill is the only one to survive. Twing's major business was in the production of iron parts, for which he built a foundry in 1818. He produced parts for use in mills, including waterwheels and possibly turbines, but also engaged in other pursuits, including the custom grinding of grains. The facilities continued to be used until the turn of the 20th century for the production of water power technology; most of the complex was demolished in the 1960s.

== See also ==
- National Register of Historic Places listings in Washington County, Vermont
