= Worcester Town Hall =

- U.S. National Register of Historic Places
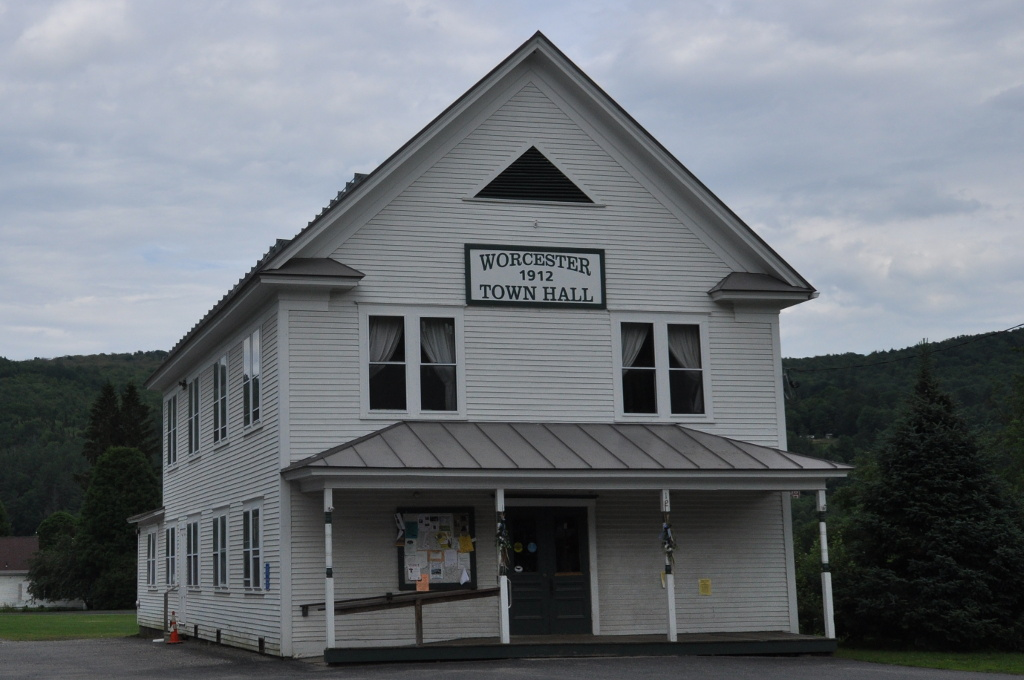

- Location within Vermont Location within the United States
- Location: 12 Worcester Village Rd., Worcester, Vermont
- Coordinates: 44°22′23″N 72°33′0″W
- Area: 0.5 acres (0.20 ha)
- Built: 1912
- Architectural style: Queen Anne
- MPS: Historic Government Buildings MPS
- NRHP reference No.: 05001234
- Added to NRHP: November 9, 2005

Worcester Town Hall is the historic center of civic activity in Worcester, Vermont. Built in 1912 at the center of the rural community's main village, it has served since then as home to the community's town meetings, and for social gatherings and events. It was listed on the National Register of Historic Places in 2005.

== Description and history ==
Worcester Town Hall is located at the center of Worcester village, at the southeast corner of Worcester Village Road (Vermont Route 12) and Calais Road. It is a 2 1/2-story wood-frame structure, with a gabled roof and clapboarded exterior. It is basically vernacular in character, with modest Queen Anne detailing in its large gable returns and the turned posts supporting the front porch roof. Paired sash windows are set on the second story above the entrance, and a triangular fan is set in the gable. The interior has a front lobby, with flanking stairs to the second floor. On each floor, a hallway leads toward the rear, flanked by smaller rooms, leading to a larger meeting space. The downstairs space is smaller, the flanking rooms each housing kitchen spaces, while the upper meeting hall has a stage at the far end.

The town of Worcester was chartered in 1763, but was abandoned in 1816, the "Year Without a Summer", when many crops failed. It was resettled in 1821, its early town meetings held in a local tavern. In 1846 a combination church and town hall was built, providing space for both town meetings and the local Congregationalists. That building was destroyed by fire in 1904. The present building was completed in 1912 on the site of the previous hall. It has been home to town meetings and social gatherings since then; the town's offices, which were never located in the previous building, are located in a different building constructed in 1990.

== See also ==
- National Register of Historic Places listings in Washington County, Vermont
