= Colby Mansion =

Historic house in Vermont, United States

- U.S. National Register of Historic Places
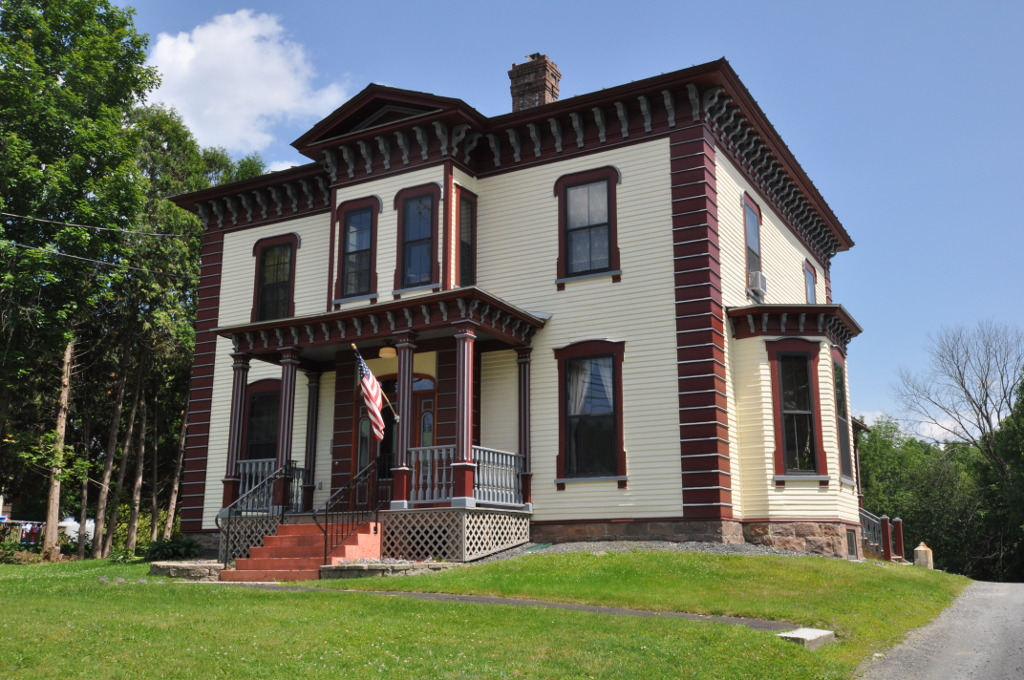

- Location within Vermont Location within the United States
- Location: VT 100, Waterbury, Vermont
- Coordinates: 44°20′59″N 72°44′35″W
- Area: 1 acre (0.40 ha)
- Built: 1870
- Architect: Colby, George J.
- NRHP reference No.: 79000228
- Added to NRHP: September 10, 1979

The Colby Mansion is a historic house on Vermont Route 100 in Waterbury, Vermont. It was built in 1870 by George J. Colby, a proponent of ideas of house construction for healthy living, and exhibits all of the major features of his published works. It was listed on the National Register of Historic Places in 1979.

== Description and history ==
The Colby Mansion stands in Waterbury's Colbyville village, a short way south of the junction of VT 100 with Laurel Road and Crossroad Road. It is set on the southeast side of Route 100, roughly opposite a modern hotel. It is a two-story wood-frame structure, with a shallow-pitch hip roof and clapboarded exterior. Its Italianate style includes quoined corners, bracketed eaves, molded window surrounds with small brackets and ears, and a front porch with paneled square posts, turned balusters, and bracketed roof line. The center bay on the second floor projects above the porch, with a gabled roof, two windows in front, and narrow windows on each side.

The house was built in 1870 to a design by George J. Colby, a prominent local industrialist. Colby was an advocate of healthy living, and published ideas concerning the proper construction and outfitting of residences to that end in a series of articles in 1871. His ideas, all present in this house, included symmetrical composition, balloon-frame construction, forced hot air heat, indoor plumbing (including sinks in each bedroom), and natural woodwork for interior finishes.

== See also ==
- National Register of Historic Places listings in Washington County, Vermont
