= Center Road Culvert =

- U.S. National Register of Historic Places
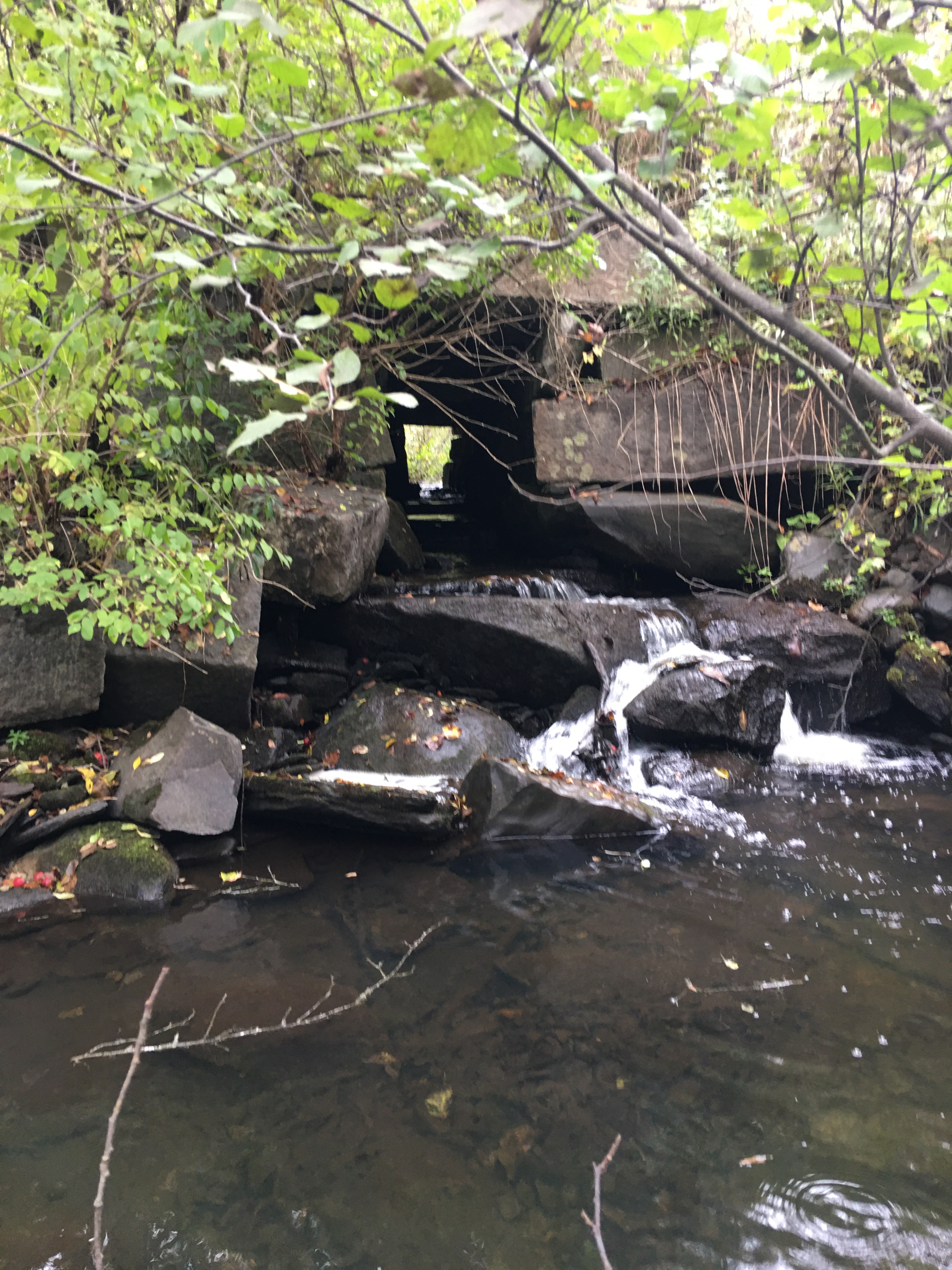

- Location within Vermont Location within the United States
- Location: Center Road over Mallory Brook, East Montpelier, Vermont
- Coordinates: 44°17′10″N 72°31′18″W
- Area: less than one acre
- Built: 1899
- Architectural style: Stone culvert
- NRHP reference No.: 100005024
- Added to NRHP: March 2, 2020

The Center Road Culvert is a historic stone culvert on Center Road at Mallory Brook in East Montpelier, Vermont. It was built in 1899 as an early project after the establishment of the Vermont Highway Commission in 1898, and is a well-preserved example of dry-laid stone box culvert. The last major work on the culvert was performed in 1930, after it suffered damage in Vermont's devastating 1927 floods. VTrans recommended the culvert undergo preservation rather than replacement following damage from Hurricane Irene, and Mallory Brook is to be rerouted through a larger modern structure. It was listed on the National Register of Historic Places in 2020.

== See also ==
- National Register of Historic Places listings in Washington County, Vermont
- List of bridges on the National Register of Historic Places in Vermont
