= Chauncey B. Leonard House =

Historic house in Vermont, United States

- U.S. National Register of Historic Places
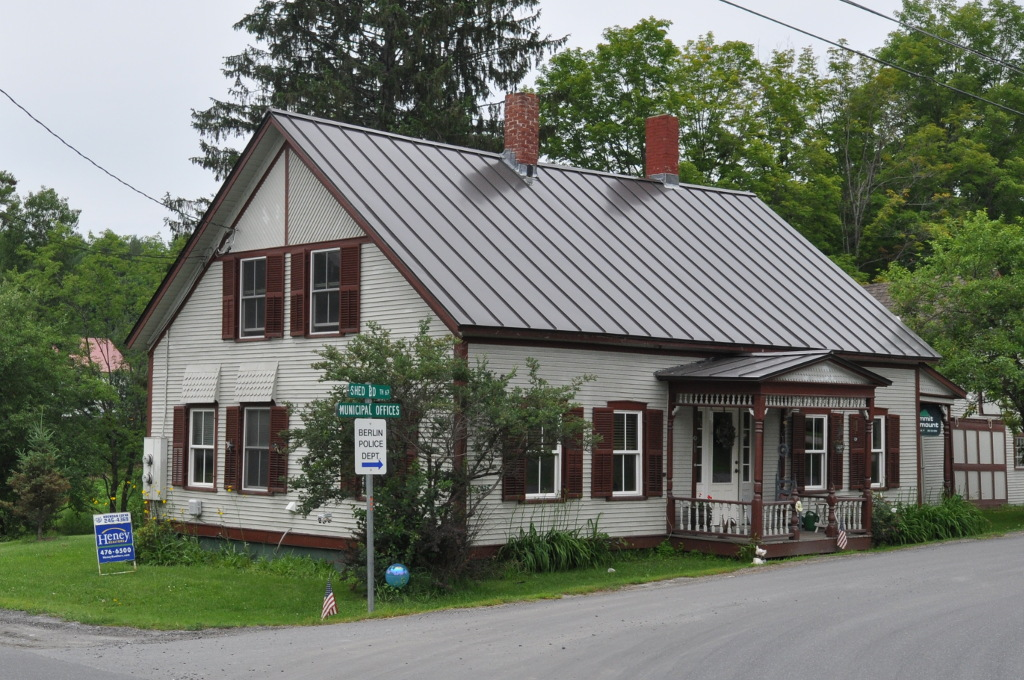

- Location within Vermont Location within the United States
- Location: Shed Rd. at Crosstown Rd., Berlin, Vermont
- Coordinates: 44°12′39″N 72°34′48″W
- Area: 0.4 acres (0.16 ha)
- Built: 1845
- Architectural style: Greek Revival, Queen Anne
- NRHP reference No.: 95000176
- Added to NRHP: March 9, 1995

The Chauncey B. Leonard House is a historic house on Shed Road at Crosstown Road in Berlin, Vermont. Built about 1845, it is one of the oldest houses in Berlin, built in the Berlin Corners area that was once the town center. It was listed on the National Register of Historic Places in 1995.

== Description and history ==
The Chauncey B. Leonard House stands at the northwest corner of Shed Road and Crosstown Road, about 0.2 miles (0.32 km) west of Paine Turnpike, a historically major north–south route through the area, and just east of Pond Brook, impounded in historic times for the construction of mills. The house is a modest 1 1/2-story wood frame Cape style structure, with a gabled roof and clapboarded exterior. It is five bays wide and three deep, and faces Shed Road, now the access road to the town's municipal complex. The main entrance is sheltered by a porch with Victorian turned posts and balusters, and a spindled valance above. Ground floor windows on the facade facing Crosstown Road are topped by slight projections decorated with scallop-cut shingles, and the gable above has angled siding at the peak.

The Berlin Corners area developed as a small village in the early 19th century, and became more prominent as a civic center after the town's first meeting house (located on Turner Hill) burned down in 1838. Located at the outlet of Berlin Pond, Pond Brook provided water power for grist and saw mills, and was the town's early economic center. Chauncey Leonard, a blacksmith, built his house here about 1845, and it was for many years associated with various owners of the mills. The house's Queen Anne alterations were made by Mary Perkins, who purchased it in 1892 and lived here for forty years.

== See also ==
- National Register of Historic Places listings in Washington County, Vermont
