= Green Mountain Seminary =

- U.S. National Register of Historic Places

- Location within Vermont Location within the United States
- Location: Hollow Rd., Waterbury Center, Vermont
- Coordinates: 44°22′39″N 72°43′5″W
- Built: 1869
- Architectural style: Italianate
- NRHP reference No.: 78000245
- Added to NRHP: January 30, 1978

Green Mountain Seminary is a historic seminary building on Hollow Road in Waterbury Center, Vermont. Built in 1869 as a Free Will Baptist coeducational school, it has seen educational uses since its construction, and is a prominent local example of Italianate architecture. It was listed on the National Register of Historic Places in 1978.

== Description and history ==
The former Green Mountain Seminary stands on a rise overlooking Hollow Road to the west, just north of the main intersection at the center of Waterbury Center. It is a 3 1/2-story wood-frame structure built in a T shape, with a cross-gabled roof, clapboarded exterior, and a high stone foundation. The building corners are quoined, and the entrances are sheltered by a hoods with elaborate scrolled brackets. The eaves and gable edges also feature paired brackets. The building originally had a cupola at the center of the roof, but this was removed in 1941.

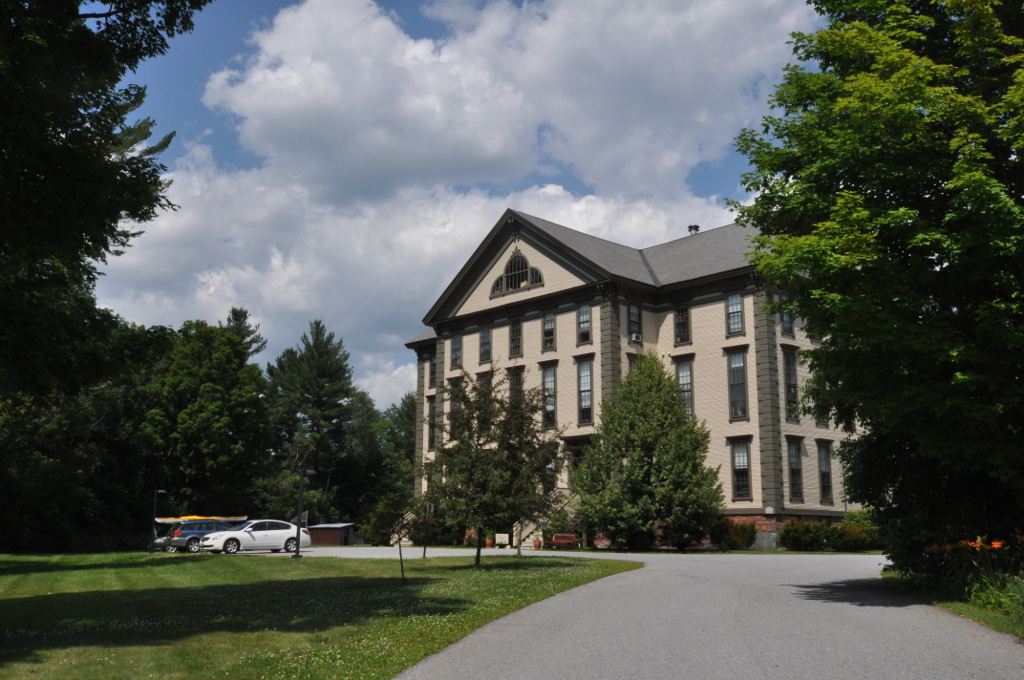
The seminary building in 2015

The seminary building was built in 1869 as a co-educational Free Will Baptist school, with an addition to the south facing part of the structure completed in 1871. As originally laid out, the lower two floors were used for educational purposes and included a chapel, while the third floor and attic level were used for men's housing. The building went through a variety of educational and boarding uses until 1895, when it was deeded to the town for use as a graded school building. Between 1947 and 1952 the building was the meeting site for the Green Mountain Horology society, whose members restored the historic Riley Whiting grandfather clock. As of 2009 the building is home to the Hunger Mountain Day Care Center and the Waterbury Center Library.

== See also ==
- National Register of Historic Places listings in Washington County, Vermont
