= Joslin Farm =

- U.S. National Register of Historic Places
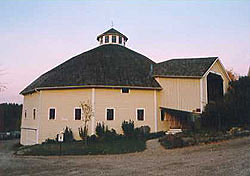

- Location within Vermont Location within the United States
- Location: 1661 E. Warren Rd., 1.5 miles (2.4 km) E of jct. with Bridge St., Waitsfield, Vermont
- Coordinates: 44°10′7″N 72°48′36″W
- Area: 84 acres (34 ha)
- Built: 1860
- Built by: Joslin, James Julian "Jules"
- Architectural style: Greek Revival, Polygonal barn
- NRHP reference No.: 88002058
- Added to NRHP: October 27, 1988

Joslin Farm is a historic farm property at 1661 East Warren Road in Waitsfield, Vermont. First developed c. 1830, the farm is home to one of Vermont's shrinking number of round barns. Now used as a bed and breakfast called The Inn at the Round Barn, the farm property was listed on the National Register of Historic Places in 1988.

== Description and history ==
Joslin Farm is located in a rural area of central Waitsfield, on 84 acres (34 ha) straddling East Warren Road south of Waitsfield village. The land east of the road is mostly open fields, while that to the west is open near the road, and wooded as it rises a hill. The small complex of farm buildings is set on the east side of the road, with the round barn at the northern end, and the elongated main house to its south. The barn is actually a twelve-sided timber-frame structure, arranged as a bank barn with ground access on three levels. The house is a vernacular 2 1/2-story wood-frame structure, with modest Greek Revival elements. It is extended to the north by a series of ells ending in a carriage barn.

The farm property was purchased by Cyrus Joslin in November 1831, and was his home until his death in 1866. The oldest portion of the house is probably one of its ells, with the present main block a later construction. The barn was probably built in 1910 by Joslin's grandson Clem. The property was operated in the 20th century as a dairy farm, and ceased those operations in 1977. The buildings have since been rehabilitated for use as a bed and breakfast inn.

== See also ==
- National Register of Historic Places listings in Washington County, Vermont
