= Lareau Farmstead =

- Lareau Farm
- U.S. National Register of Historic Places
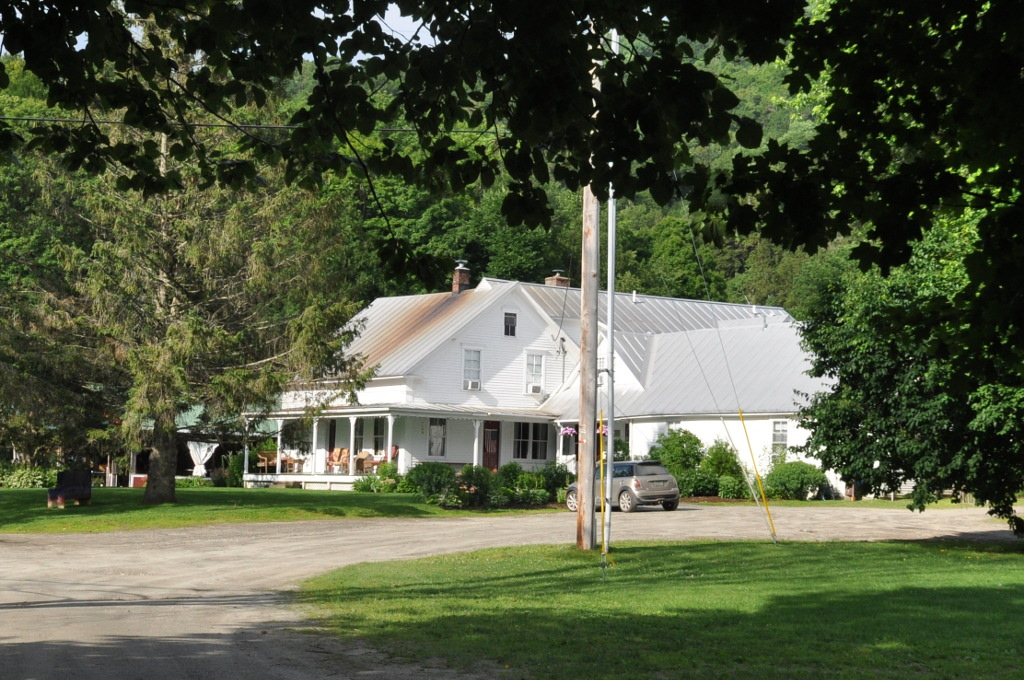

- Location within Vermont Location within the United States
- Location: 48 Lareau Rd., Waitsfield, Vermont
- Coordinates: 44°10′21″N 72°50′3″W
- Area: 25 acres (10 ha)
- Built: 1795
- Architectural style: Greek Revival
- NRHP reference No.: 16000919
- Added to NRHP: December 27, 2016

Lareau Farm is a historic farm property at 48 Lareau Road in Waitsfield, Vermont. First settled in 1794 by Simeon Stoddard and his wife Abiah, two of the town's early settlers, the farmstead includes both a house and barn dating to that period. Now serving primarily as a bed and breakfast inn, the farm property was listed on the National Register of Historic Places in 2016.

== Description and history ==
The Lareau Farm consists of 25 acres (10 ha) on the west side of Vermont Route 100, south of Waitsfield Village and just north of the road's crossing of the Mad River. The farmstead is set near the river, and is accessed via the short Lareau Road. The complex includes a typical New England connected farmstead, which has a main block connected via a series of ells to a horse and carriage barn. North of the house stands a dairy barn, and a modern event pavilion stands to the south. The main block of the house is a 1-1/2 story Cottage style Cape, with a raised half-story. It has corner pilasters and an entablature in the Greek Revival, and was built about 1835.

The farm property was first developed about 1795 by Doctor Simeon Stoddard, who arrived in the area in 1794 along with Benjamin Wait, for whom the town is named. Stoddard built the oldest portion of the dairy barn, an English barn form that was rotated and enlarged in 1895. He also built as a house what is now the ell of the main house. The property underwent significant enlargement under the ownership of Pliny Lockwood in 1895; in addition to enlarging the original barn, he also built the horse barn at the north end of the house. The property was purchased Philippe and Fleurette Lareau in 1940. It presently serves as a bed and breakfast.

== See also ==
- National Register of Historic Places listings in Washington County, Vermont
