= National Clothespin Factory =

- U.S. National Register of Historic Places
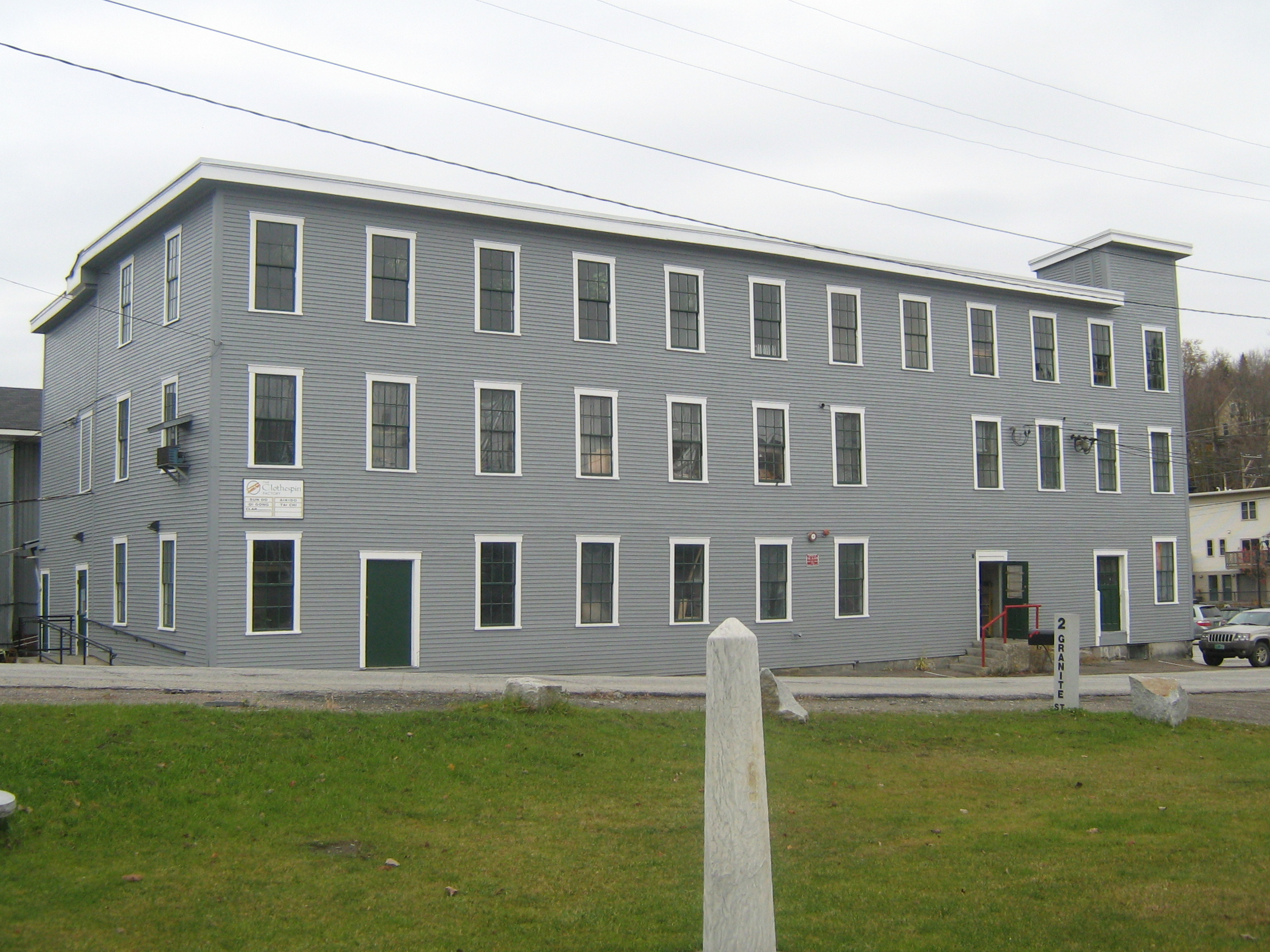

- Location within Vermont Location within the United States
- Location: One Granite St., Montpelier, Vermont
- Coordinates: 44°15′8″N 72°34′16″W
- Area: 0.3 acres (0.12 ha)
- Built: 1918
- Architectural style: Wood frame factory
- NRHP reference No.: 05001422
- Added to NRHP: December 16, 2005

The National Clothespin Factory is a historic industrial building at One Granite Street in Montpelier, Vermont. Built in 1918, it is a significant local example of an early 20th-century wood-frame factory, and was home to the nation's last manufacturer of wooden clothespins. Now adapted for other uses, the building was listed on the National Register of Historic Places in 2005.

== Description and history ==
The former National Clothespin Factory is located in an industrial area southeast of downtown Montpelier, on the north side of Granite Street between the railroad tracks and the Winooski River. The main building is a three-story wood-frame structure, with a flat roof. It is twelve bays wide and two deep, with three asymmetrically placed entrances on the long street-facing facade, and a short tower at the northeast corner. Additions extend the building to the north, and there is a single-story shed-roofed office building between the main factory and the river.

The National Clothespin Company, founded in 1887, was one of two clothespin manufacturers in Montpelier, originally occupying space at One Main Street. It had this facility constructed in 1918, and operated here until 2003. Of a maximum of fifteen clothespin factories in the nation, it was the last to close down, the industry harmed by low-cost foreign competition and the advent of powered clothes dryers. The building is one of Vermont's best-preserved wooden factory buildings of the early 20th century, including among other items an original period elevator, manufactured by the Energy Elevator Company of Philadelphia.

== See also ==
- National Register of Historic Places listings in Washington County, Vermont
