= Union Meetinghouse (East Montpelier, Vermont) =

Historic church in Vermont, United States

- U.S. National Register of Historic Places
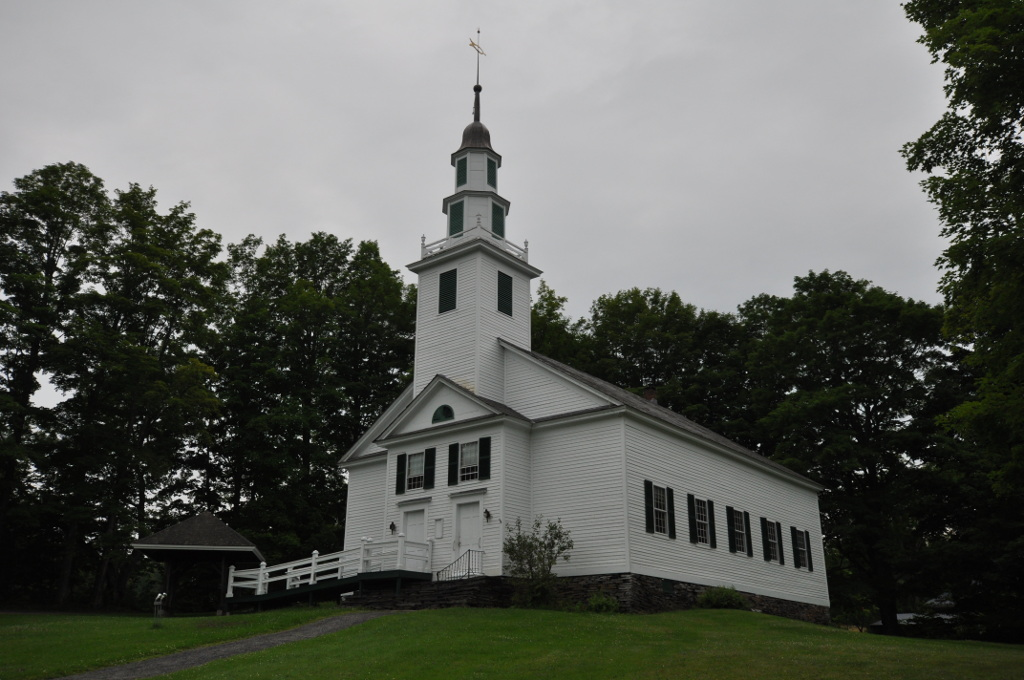

- Location within Vermont Location within the United States
- Location: Center Rd., East Montpelier, Vermont
- Coordinates: 44°17′0″N 72°31′39″W
- Area: 0.8 acres (0.32 ha)
- Built: 1823
- Architectural style: Federal
- NRHP reference No.: 80000342
- Added to NRHP: June 30, 1980

The Union Meetinghouse, also known as The Old Meeting House and the East Montpelier Center Meeting House, is a historic church on Center Road in East Montpelier, Vermont. Built in 1823–26, it is the oldest church building in the greater Montpelier area, and a well-preserved example of Federal period church architecture. It served as a union church for multiple denominations for many years, and housed the annual town meetings until 1849. The building was added to the National Register of Historic Places in 1980. It is now home to a non-denominational community congregation.

== Description and history ==
The Old Meetinghouse stands near the geographic center of the township that is now divided into Montpelier and East Montpelier. It stands on the south side of Center Road, a short way west of its junction with Brazier Road. It is a 1 1/2-story wood-frame structure, with a gabled roof, clapboarded exterior, and stone foundation. A two-bay entry vestibule projects from the center of the front facade, and a tower rises astride the main ridge and that of the vestibule. The tower's square base includes a louvered upper section, and is capped by a cornice and balustrade. The next two stages are octagonal and decreasing in size, with a bellcast roof and spire at the top. There are two entrances in the projecting pavilion, framed by simple corner boards and topped by cornices, with small sash windows directly above. The fully pedimented gable of the projection has a Federal style fan at the center.

The church was built in 1823–26 on land given by Parley Davis, the area's first surveyor and settler, as a town common. Davis had hoped that the area would become Montpelier's town center. The building was used for services by a number of congregations of different denominations, and hosted Montpelier's town meetings until 1849, when East Montpelier was separated. It held some of East Montpelier's town meetings until 1890, when its first town hall was built. Use of the building by religious groups declined in the early 20th century, but was revived in 1965 with the formation of the non-denominational Old Meeting House Society.

== See also ==
- National Register of Historic Places listings in Washington County, Vermont
