= Woodbury Graded School =

- U.S. National Register of Historic Places
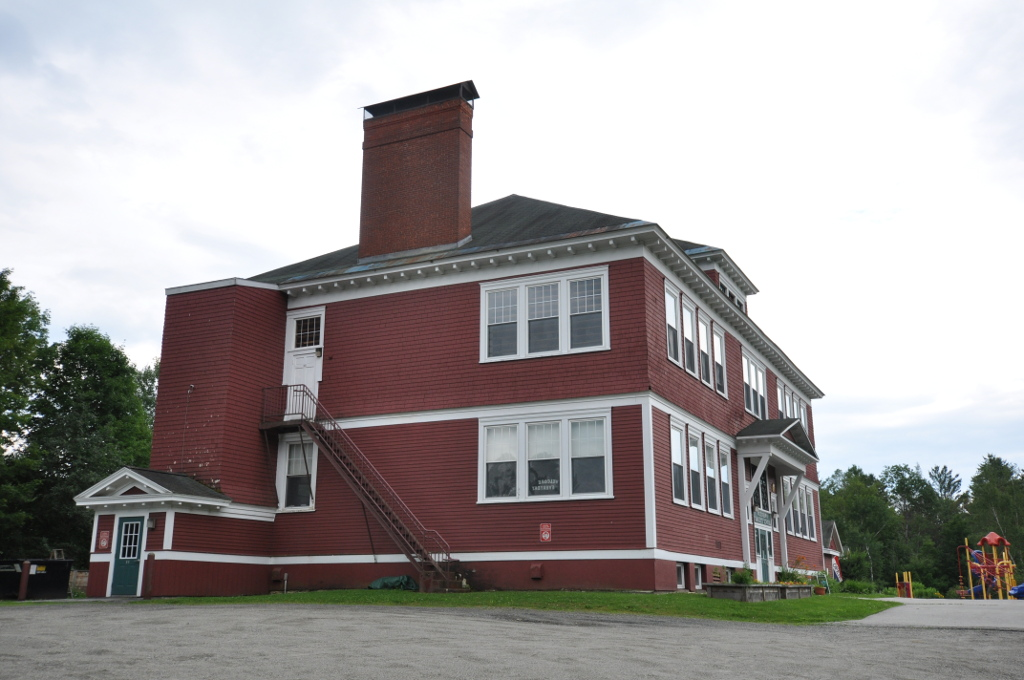

- Location within Vermont Location within the United States
- Location: 63 Valley Lake Rd., Woodbury, Vermont
- Coordinates: 44°12′6″N 72°30′47″W
- Area: 5 acres (2.0 ha)
- Built: 1914
- Architectural style: Colonial Revival
- MPS: Educational Resources of Vermont MPS
- NRHP reference No.: 93001008
- Added to NRHP: September 30, 1993

The Woodbury Graded School is a historic school building located at 63 Valley Lake Road in Woodbury, Vermont. Built in 1914, it is a prominent local example of Colonial Revival architecture, and of a period grade school. The building continues to serve its original purpose, now called the Woodbury Elementary School, and was listed on the National Register of Historic Places in 1993.

== Description and history ==
The Woodbury Graded School is located on the western fringe of Woodbury's small village center, on the south side of Valley Lake Road. It is a two-story wood-frame building, with a hip roof and exterior of wooden shingles and clapboards. The roof has an eave with exposed rafter ends, two large chimneys rising from the long ends, and a hip roofed dormer at the center of the long side. The main entrance, centered on the long side, is sheltered by a broad gable-roofed hood, supported by plain triangular brackets; its gable and eave have similar exposed rafter ends. The entry area includes a main entrance halfway between the basement and first floor levels, with a handicap ramp rising on the right side to a second entrance at the first floor. It has bands of sash windows, a characteristic of period schools mandated by state standards.

The school was built in 1919, as part of the town's efforts to consolidate its district schools, and to handle an influx of students after the area's economy boomed because of its successful granite quarries. The building has continued to serve as the town's primary school since its construction, and presently serves grades K-6.

== See also ==
- National Register of Historic Places listings in Washington County, Vermont
