= Woodbury Town Hall =

- U.S. National Register of Historic Places
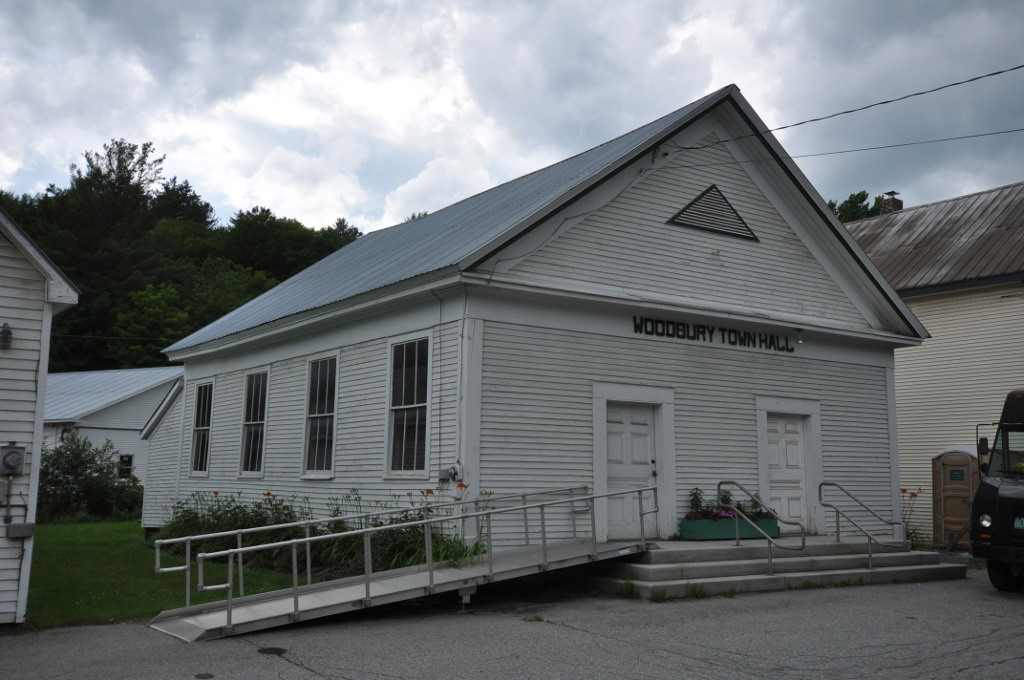

- Location within Vermont Location within the United States
- Location: VT 14, Woodbury, Vermont
- Coordinates: 44°26′26″N 72°24′57″W
- Area: less than one acre
- Built: 1842
- Architectural style: Greek Revival
- NRHP reference No.: 95000296
- Added to NRHP: March 31, 1995

Woodbury Town Hall is center of town government of Woodbury, Vermont. It is located on the west side of Vermont Route 14 in the town's village center. Built in 1842, it is a well-preserved example of a vernacular Greek Revival municipal building. It was listed on the National Register of Historic Places in 1995.

== Description and history ==
Woodbury Town Hall is one of a cluster of buildings at the center of Woodbury village. Set just south of the junction of Vermont 14 and Valley Lake Road, it is set back about 50 feet (15 m) from Route 14, between the fire station and the village store. These buildings are fronted by a common parking area, with a small town green separating that from the main road. The town hall is a single-story wood-frame structure, with a front gable roof and clapboarded exterior. Its main facade is symmetrical, with a pair of entrance. The building corners and entrances have wide trim borders, and the gable above is fully pedimented, with a triangular fan at its center. The interior contains a single large chamber, with a stage at the far end, and a small kitchen in a rear ell.

The town of Woodbury was settled in 1781, and held its first recorded town meeting in 1806. Its early town meetings were held in a district school near the town center. This town hall was built in 1842 after the town's growing population prompted the need for a larger civic meeting space. Local residents believe that the land on which it stands only remains the town's as long as the building continues to be used for town meetings.

== See also ==
- National Register of Historic Places listings in Washington County, Vermont
