= Waterbury Center State Park =

State park in Washington County, Vermont

- Interactive map of Waterbury Center State Park
- Type: State park
- Location: 177 Reservoir Rd. Waterbury Center, Vermont
- Coordinates: 44.3818°N 72.7296°W
- Area: 90 acres (36 ha)
- Created: 1986
- Operator: Vermont Department of Forests, Parks, and Recreation
- Open: Day use
- Website: https://vtstateparks.com/waterbury.html

Waterbury Center State Park is a 90-acre day-use state park on the 850-acre Waterbury Reservoir in Waterbury Center, Vermont. It is located in Mount Mansfield State Forest. It was created in 1986.

Activities includes swimming, boating, fishing, hiking, picnicking, bicycling, wildlife watching, and winter sports.

Facilities include a swimming beach, picnic areas and grills, boat rentals, a trailer boat ramp, concession area and restrooms. There is a universally-accessible trail that includes two accessible fishing platforms.

Little River State Park is a campground park also located nearby on Waterbury Reservoir.
