= Parley Davis House =

Historic house in Vermont, United States

- U.S. National Register of Historic Places
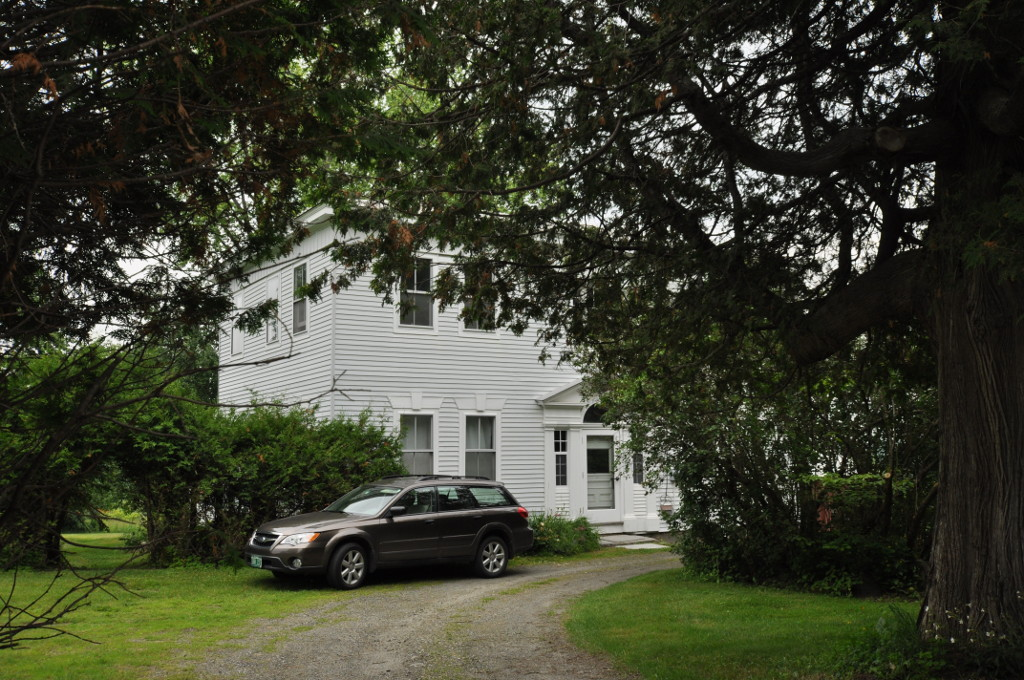

- Location within Vermont Location within the United States
- Location: Center Rd., East Montpelier, Vermont
- Coordinates: 44°17′1″N 72°31′46″W
- Area: 3.1 acres (1.3 ha)
- Built: 1799
- Architectural style: Federal
- NRHP reference No.: 89000242
- Added to NRHP: September 18, 1989

The Parley Davis House is a historic house on Center Road in East Montpelier, Vermont. Built in stages between 1795 and about 1805, it is one of the oldest buildings in the community, built by one of the first settlers of Montpelier, and served as the site of town government until 1828. It was listed on the National Register of Historic Places in 1989.

== Description and history ==
The Parley Davis House stands in the village of East Montpelier Center, on the north side of Center Road. The main block is a two-story wood-frame structure, with a hip roof and clapboarded exterior, to which an older Cape-style frame house is attached to the rear as an ell. The main block exhibits quality Federal woodwork, including an elaborate front entry with pilasters and sidelight windows beneath a half-round transom and gabled pediment. A Palladian window is above the entry. The interior of the main block retains original Federal period woodwork, while the rear ell reflects late 19th-century alterations.

The oldest portion of the house is the rear ell. In 1791, Parley Davis built a log cabin. About 1795, he built a wood-frame cabin on this site, which was enlarged c. 1799 to the Cape frame seen as the ell today. About 1805, he built the Federal period main block of the house. Parley Davis was one of the first white settlers in the area, establishing mills that enabled further development of the area to take place. His home was also where early town meetings (of what was then Montpelier) took place until 1828, when they were moved to the nearby Methodist church. His house now stands as an important example of the evolution of architecture in early Vermont.

== See also ==
- National Register of Historic Places listings in Washington County, Vermont
