= Middlesex–Winooski River Bridge =

- U.S. National Register of Historic Places
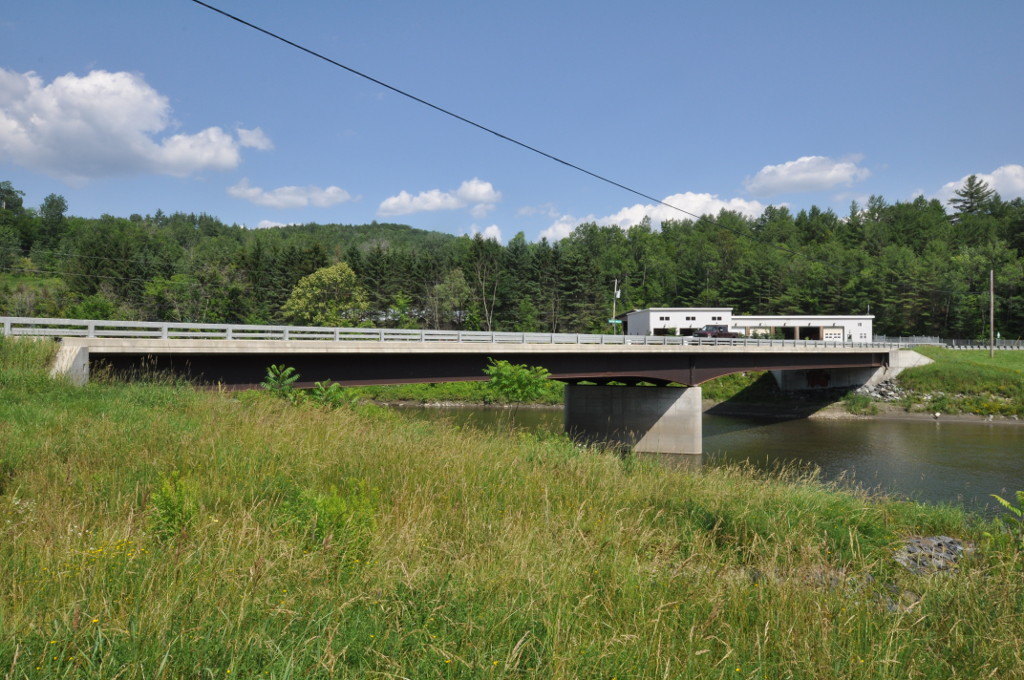

- Location within Vermont Location within the United States
- Location: US 2 over the Winooski River, Middlesex, Vermont
- Coordinates: 44°18′22″N 72°41′48″W
- Area: less than one acre
- Built: 1928
- Built by: American Bridge Company
- Architectural style: Pratt through truss bridge
- MPS: Metal Truss, Masonry, and Concrete Bridges in Vermont MPS
- NRHP reference No.: 91001610
- Added to NRHP: November 14, 1991

The Middlesex–Winooski River Bridge is a steel girder bridge carrying U.S. Route 2 (US 2) across the Winooski River in a rural area on the town line between Moretown and Middlesex, Vermont. The two-span bridge was built in 2010, replacing a 1928 three-span Pratt through truss, which was listed on the National Register of Historic Places in 1991.

== Setting ==
The Middlesex–Winooski River Bridge is located northwest of the village center of Middlesex, in the Winooski River floodplain. The river flows north at the crossing, ultimately heading northwesterly to Burlington and Lake Champlain. The bridge is set at an angle on concrete abutments and pier, with an orientation from southeast to northwest. The bridge was built in 2010.

== Historic bridge ==
The historic bridge was set in a similar orientation to the modern bridge. It had two long spans, each 120 feet (37 m), carried by Pratt through trusses, and short 57-foot (17 m) girder span at the north end. The bridge trusses were fabricated by the American Bridge Company and the bridge was completed in 1928. In 1927, this part of the Winooski River watershed was subjected some of the state's most devastating flooding. US 2 was at that time the principal road artery between Burlington and Montpelier, and many bridges (both highway and railroad) were either swept away or suffered significant damage, resulting in the isolation of Middlesex village. The 1928 bridge was built as part of the state's crash program to build more than 1,200 bridges.

== See also ==
- List of bridges on the National Register of Historic Places in Vermont
- National Register of Historic Places listings in Washington County, Vermont
