= Jones–Pestle Farmstead =

- U.S. National Register of Historic Places
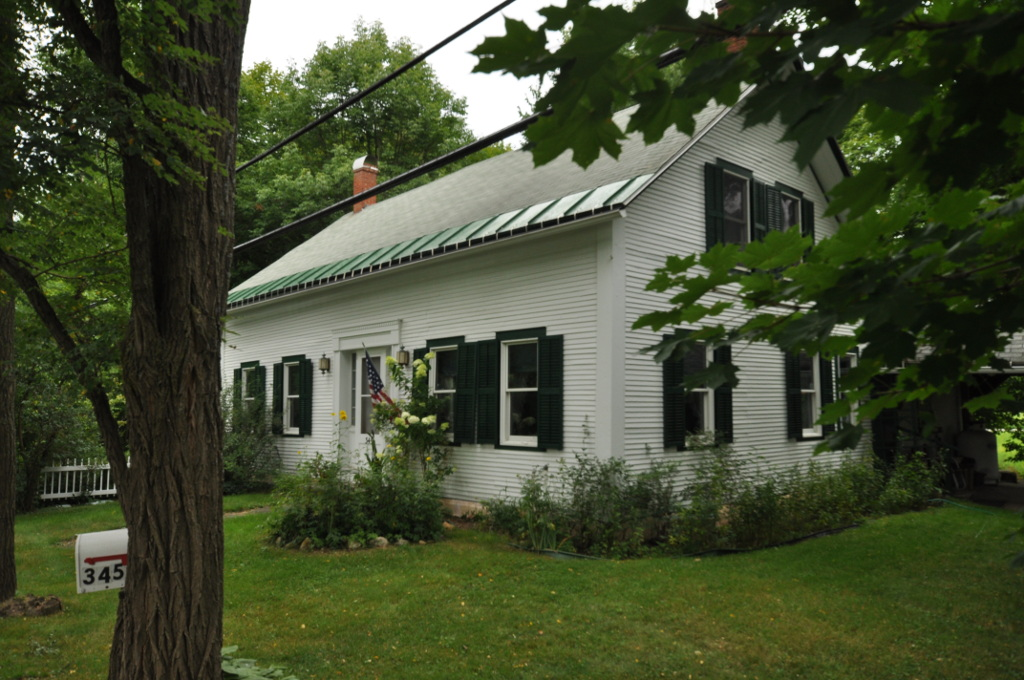

- Location within Vermont Location within the United States
- Location: 339 Bridge St., Waitsfield, Vermont
- Coordinates: 44°11′11″N 72°49′11″W
- Area: 13 acres (5.3 ha)
- Built: 1840
- Architectural style: Greek Revival
- NRHP reference No.: 15000582
- Added to NRHP: September 8, 2015

The Jones–Pestle Farmstead is a historic farm property at 339 Bridge Street in Waitsfield, Vermont, United States. First developed in the 1820s, it is a well-preserved 19th-century disconnected farm complex. It was listed on the National Register of Historic Places in 2015.

== Description and history ==
The Jones–Pestle Farmstead is located on the southeastern edge of Waitsfield village, on 13 acres (5.3 ha) straddling Bridge Street. The farmstead is a cluster of buildings on either side of Bridge Street just northwest of its junction with East Warren and Joslin Hill Roads. The main house, a 1 1/2-story wood frame Cape, is set near the road on the north side, connected by a breezeway to a horse barn. Across the street is a c. 1825 English barn, with a granary standing next to it. The house has a modest Greek Revival entrance surround.

The property was probably established as a farm in the 1820s by Daniel Thayer, an early settler of Waitsfield who also established mills on the nearby Mad River. Thayer left Waitsfield in 1853, and the property came into the hands of Orvis Jones. The property remained in the Jones family until 1938, when it was acquired by the Pestles. Ray Pestle served as principal of the local high school, and raised dairy cattle on the property until 1966, when regular agricultural use of the property ended. The farm complex is a well-preserved example of a disconnected farmstead, and the barn is one of the oldest in the region.

== See also ==
- National Register of Historic Places listings in Washington County, Vermont
