= Lover's Lane Bridge =

- Bridge No. 27
- U.S. National Register of Historic Places
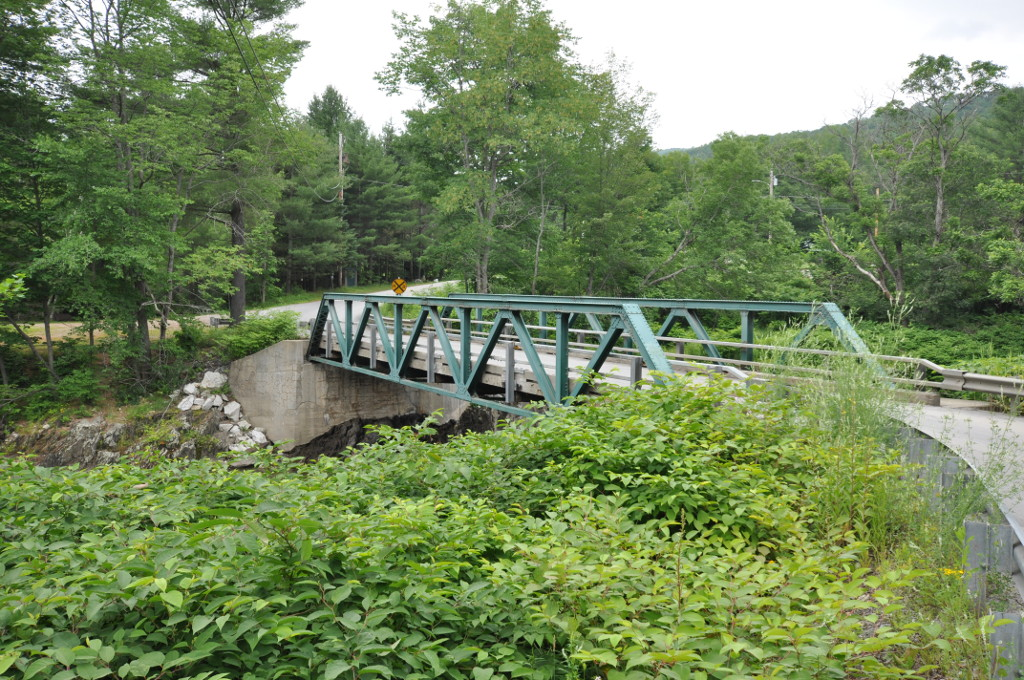

- Location within Vermont Location within the United States
- Location: Town Hwy 61, Lover's Ln., Berlin, Vermont
- Coordinates: 44°11′22″N 72°38′27″W
- Area: less than one acre
- Built: 1918
- Architectural style: Warren pony truss
- MPS: Metal Truss, Masonry, and Concrete Bridges in Vermont MPS
- NRHP reference No.: 05001523
- Added to NRHP: January 11, 2006

The Lover's Lane Bridge is a historic bridge spanning the Dog River in Berlin, Vermont. Built in 1915, it is a rare early 20th-century example of a Warren pony truss bridge. It was listed on the National Register of Historic Places in 2006 as Bridge No. 27.

== Description and history ==
Lover's Lane is a short east–west road located in southern Berlin, joining Chandler Road to the west and Vermont Route 12 to the east, each of which run roughly parallel to the north-flowing Dog River. The bridge across the river is oriented roughly northeast–southwest, at a point where the river briefly bends to the west. It is a single-span Warren pony truss structure, 85 feet (26 m) in length, resting on modern concrete abutments. The truss elements are made of rolled steel joined by bolts, a replacement for original rivets. The bridge floor is also a modern replacement, consisting of rolled steel flange beams supporting a wooden deck.

The bridge was built about 1918, replacing an earlier wooden structure (probably an open wooden truss bridge). It was built at a time when Vermont's bridge construction, including local bridges such as this one, was becoming increasingly influenced by professional engineers hired by the state's Department of Transportation. This bridge is one of a shrinking number of structures to survive from that period.

== See also ==
- National Register of Historic Places listings in Washington County, Vermont
- List of bridges on the National Register of Historic Places in Vermont
