= Worcester Village School =

- U.S. National Register of Historic Places
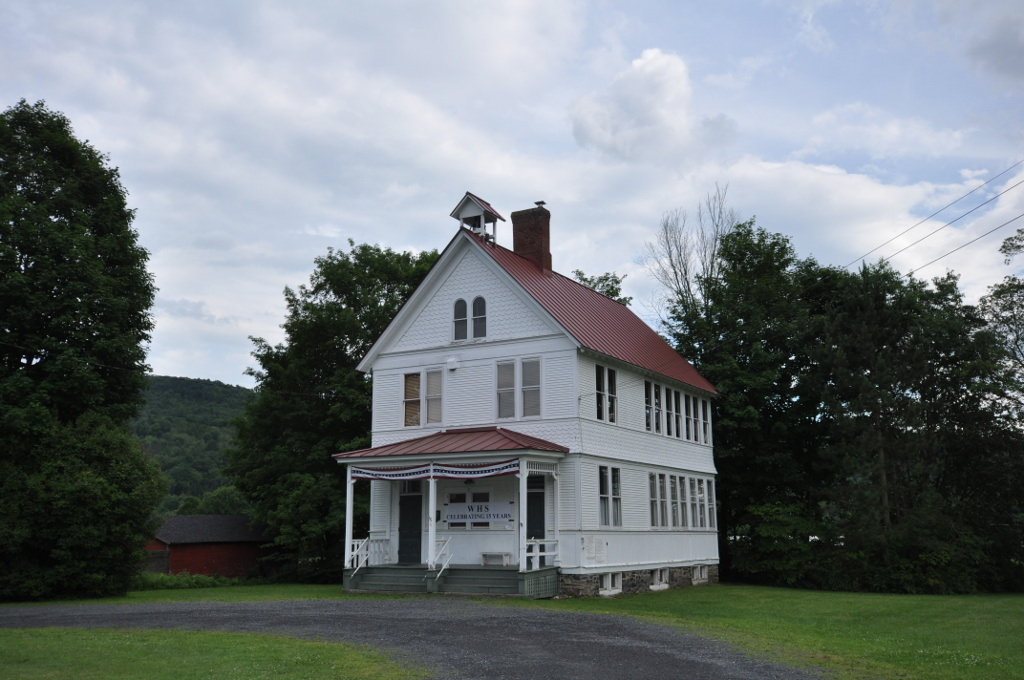

- Location within Vermont Location within the United States
- Location: 17 Calais Rd., Worcester, Vermont
- Coordinates: 44°22′21″N 72°32′55″W
- Area: less than one acre
- Built: 1892
- Architectural style: Queen Anne
- MPS: Educational Resources of Vermont MPS
- NRHP reference No.: 05001235
- Added to NRHP: November 9, 2005

The Worcester Village School is a historic school building at 17 Calais Road in Worcester, Vermont. It was built in 1892, and is a good early example of a town-wide partially graded school with restrained Queen Anne features. It served as a school until 1979, and is now owned by the local historical society. It was listed on the National Register of Historic Places in 2005.

== Description and history ==
The former Worcester Village School building stands on the south side of Calais Road, a short way east of the crossroads center of Worcester's main village. It is a 2 1/2-story wood-frame building, with a front-facing gable roof and exterior finished mainly in wooden clapboards. The front facade is symmetrical, with a pair of entrances sheltered by a hip-roofed single-story porch supported by chamfered square posts. Bands of fishscale shingles separate the first and second floors, with paired sash windows on the second floor. The eastern side of the building has bands of sash windows toward the rear, providing significant natural light to the classroom spaces. The interior is virtually intact, with front vestibules leading to large classroom spaces which occupy most of each floor. The only major alteration is that portions of the vestibule have been turned into restrooms.

The school was built in 1892, and is a rare example of a two-room 19th-century school house. It is also noted for the quality of the surviving exterior Queen Anne elements. The school was built after the state abolished the district school system, and served grades 1–4 on the ground floor and 5–8 on the upper floor. The district school it replaced was moved across the street and converted into a residence. This building was used as a school until 1979, and served from 1980 to 2004 as a day care center. It is now owned by the local historical society.

== See also ==
- National Register of Historic Places listings in Washington County, Vermont
