= East Village Meetinghouse =

Historic church in Vermont, United States

- U.S. National Register of Historic Places
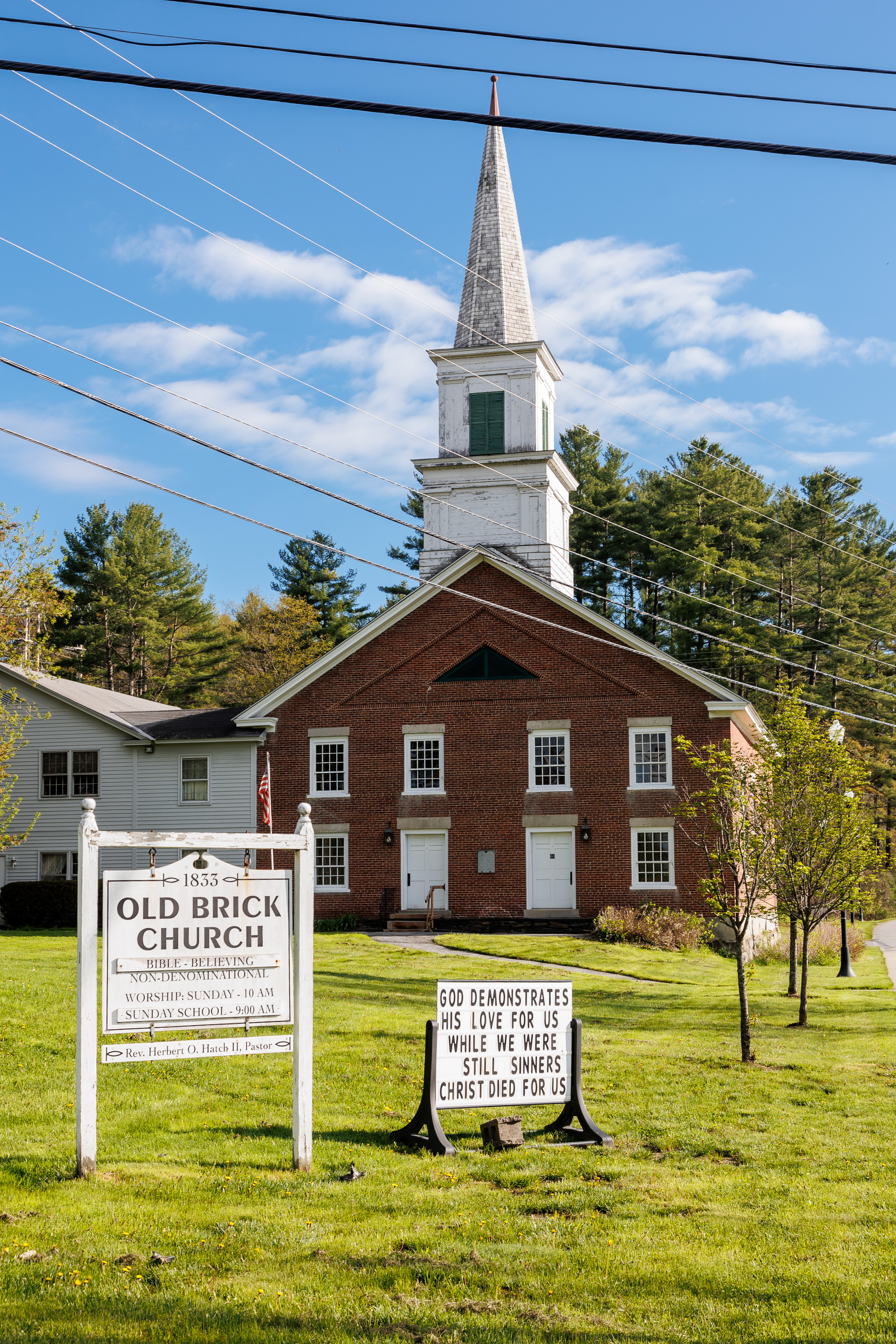

- Location within Vermont Location within the United States
- Interactive map showing the location of East Village Meetinghouse
- Location: 55 VT 14, East Montpelier, Vermont
- Coordinates: 44°16′19″N 72°29′16″W
- Area: 0.5 acres (0.20 ha)
- Built: 1833
- Architect: multiple; Stillman & Truman Kelton
- Architectural style: Greek Revival
- NRHP reference No.: 80000341
- Added to NRHP: June 30, 1980

The East Village Meetinghouse, also known as the Old Brick Church, is a historic church at 55 Vermont Route 14 in East Montpelier, Vermont. Built in 1833-34, it is a fine local example of Greek Revival architecture, and has been the focal point of the historic East Village for most of its history. It was listed on the National Register of Historic Places in 1980.

== Architecture and history ==
The Old Brick Church stands in the village center of East Montpelier, on a parcel bounded on the south by US Route 2, the east by Vermont Route 14, and the west by Quaker Road. Its walls are brick laid in American bond, and its foundation is cut granite. It is 1-1/2 stories in height, with a gabled roof from which a square tower rises. The tower's first stage has corner pilasters rising to an entablature and cornice, while the second houses the belfry, with louvered rectangular openings, corner pilasters, and surrounding entablature above. An eight-sided steeple completes the tower. The front facade is oriented to the southwest, and is symmetrical. It is four bays wide, with sash windows in most bays, and two entrances in the center two bays of the ground floor. In the gable above is a recessed panel that has a triangular louver at the center. The interior has original slip pews facing the pulpit on the rear wall. The pulpit is original, but was at first located on the front wall, from which it was moved during renovations in the early 20th century.

The village of East Montpelier was settled in 1825, and this church was built in 1833-34 on land donated by Arthur Daggett. The building team was led by Truman and Stillman Kelton, and included men who later worked on the Vermont State House. It was built as a union meeting house, serving both Congregationalist Unitarians and Methodists. About 1858, the Methodists withdrew from use of the building. Between 1940 and 1951 it was reduced to having only summer services, but has since held services year-round.

== See also ==
- National Register of Historic Places listings in Washington County, Vermont
