= Reynolds House (Barre, Vermont) =

Historic house in Vermont, United States

- U.S. National Register of Historic Places
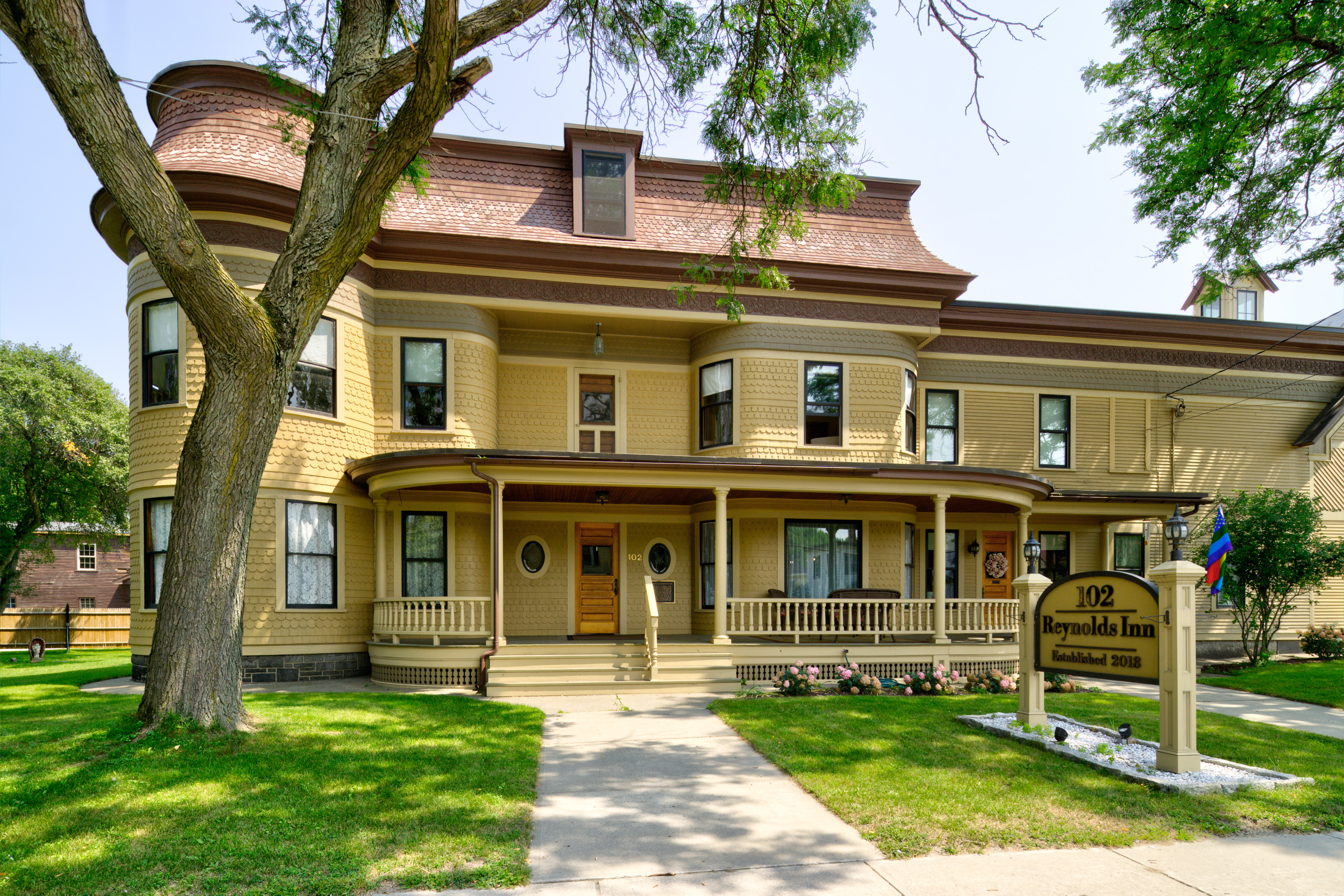

- Location within Vermont Location within the United States
- Location: 102 S. Main St., Barre, Vermont
- Coordinates: 44°11′29″N 72°29′57″W
- Area: less than one acre
- Built: 1892
- Architect: Alfred Willis Lane
- Architectural style: Late Victorian
- NRHP reference No.: 100005433
- Added to NRHP: August 5, 2020

The Reynolds House, currently the Reynolds House Inn, is a historic home at 102 South Main Street in the city of Barre, Vermont. Built in the 1892, it is a well-preserved high-style example of Late Victorian architecture, exhibiting both Queen Anne and Second Empire features. Built for a local merchant, it is a rare survivor of what was once a series of high-profile residences south of downtown Barre. It was listed on the National Register of Historic Places in 2020.

== Description and history ==
The Reynolds House is located south of downtown Barre, occupying a roughly triangular plot at the junction of South Main Street (Vermont Route 14) and Hill Street. It is a large 2 1/2-story wood-frame structure, with a mansard roof and shingled exterior. An ell extends from the main block, joining it to a period carriage barn. Prominent features include a round turret at the northwest corner, a single-story porch with turned balustrade across most of the main facade and ell, and a rounded projecting bay. The interior retains many original features, including chandeliers, builtin cabinets, and trim.

The house was built in the 1892 and finished in 1898 for George J. Reynolds his wife Jane and their son William. George was a Massachusetts native who married Jane, a woman from Barre and operated a general store in downtown Barre. The business that was started by George was a hardware store that boasted the top of the line Glenwood Heating stoves. Reynolds' neighbors included a mayor of the city and owners of some of the local granite quarries. As the latter business came to dominate the city's economy, Reynolds' business changed to serve both that business and its workers. Reynolds was a significant force in the development of downtown Barre, serving on the boards of numerous local banks and businesses. The house remained in the family until 1995; the carriage barn suffered damage by fire in 2014.

== See also ==
- National Register of Historic Places listings in Washington County, Vermont
