= Scampini Block =

- U.S. National Register of Historic Places
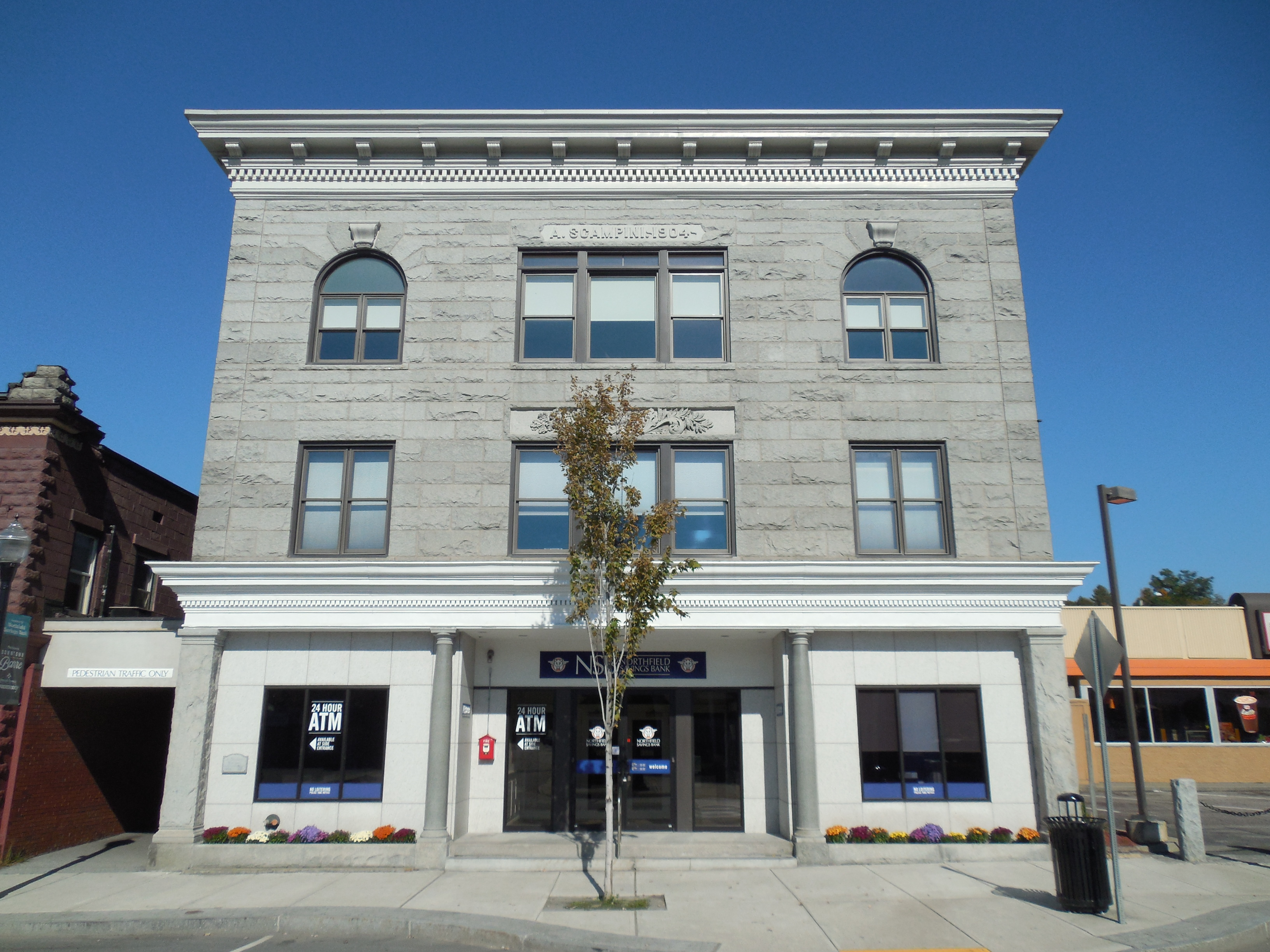

- Location within Vermont Location within the United States
- Location: 289 N. Main St., Barre, Vermont
- Coordinates: 44°12′7″N 72°30′16″W
- Area: 0.2 acres (0.081 ha)
- Built: 1904
- Architect: Colburn, F.E.
- Architectural style: Renaissance
- NRHP reference No.: 07000160
- Added to NRHP: March 13, 2007

The Scampini Block is a historic commercial building at 289 North Main Street in the city of Barre, Vermont. Built in 1904, it is an elegant showcase of the skills of local granite carvers, and was for many years a social center for the area's large immigrant stoneworkers. It was listed on the National Register of Historic Places in 2007.

== Description and history ==
The Scampini Block stands in downtown Barre, on the northeast side of North Main Street nearly opposite its junction with Granite Street. It is a three-story granite structure with a flat roof. The front facade is divided into three sections, articulated by rusticated square pilasters at the corners and smooth Tuscan columns flanking the center section of the ground floor, which support a complex projecting cornice. The ground-floor bays primarily consist of modern c. 1978 granite panels, flanking a central entrance; these features are a replacement for a historic plate glass commercial storefront with recessed entrance. The upper levels are faced in rusticated granite, with second-floor windows set in rectangular openings, and third-floor windows in the outer bays set in round-arch openings. The main roof cornice projects, with supporting modillions and a band of dentil moulding. The building's side walls are finished in brick. The interior includes imported Italian marble floors, and significant original features remain in the upper floors, which now house offices.

The block was built in 1904 by Angelo Scampini, an Italian immigrant who arrived in Barre in 1889, and in 1893 opened a shop. His shop was a center of the local Italian immigrant population, many of whom had come from Italy's stone quarrying areas in search of work. This new block, many of its features executed by Italian artisans, expanded on this role, provided a meeting hall on the third floor. In addition to Scampini's store on the ground floor, the building house offices of fraternal societies, labor unions, and granite companies, and the meeting hall was used by a number of fraternal organizations, including the Knights of Columbus, International Order of Odd Fellows, and others.

== See also ==
- National Register of Historic Places listings in Washington County, Vermont
