= North Calais Village Historic District =

Historic district in Vermont, United States

- U.S. National Register of Historic Places
- U.S. Historic district
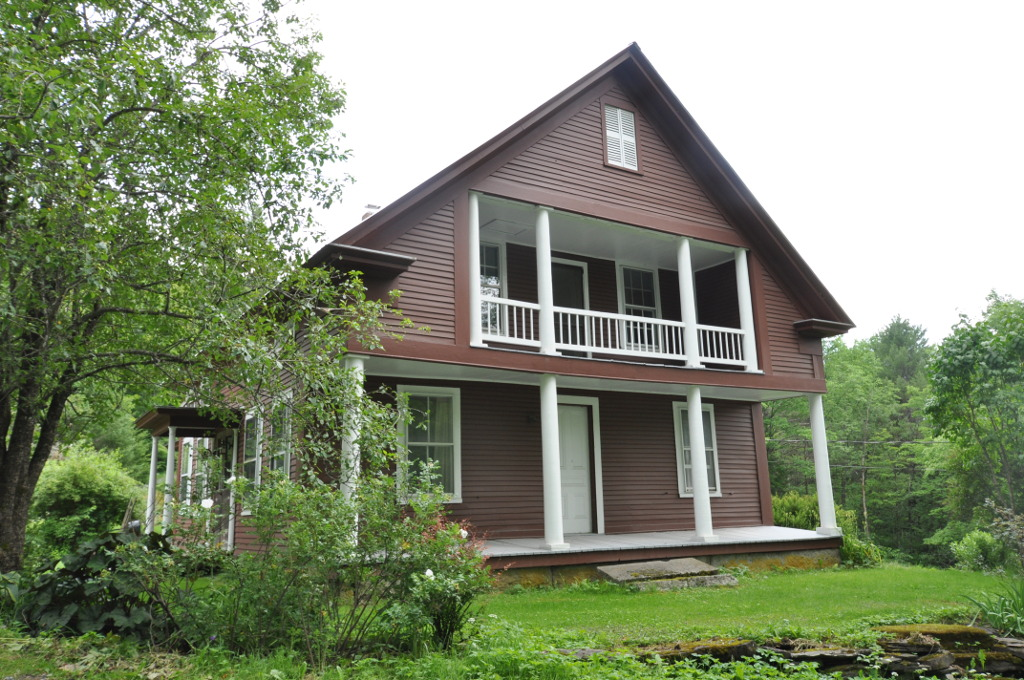

- Location within Vermont Location within the United States
- Location: N. Calais Rd., Foster Hill Rd., Upper Rd., Moscow Hills Rd., G.A.R. Rd., Calais, Vermont
- Coordinates: 44°23′27″N 72°26′37″W
- Area: 25 acres (10 ha)
- NRHP reference No.: 10000772
- Added to NRHP: September 24, 2010

The North Calais Village Historic District encompasses a linear 19th-century mill village in Calais, Vermont. It extends mainly along North Calais Road, paralleling Pekin Brook below Mirror Lake, where ruins of its former industrial past are still evident. It was listed on the National Register of Historic Places in 2010.

== Description and history ==
The historic district is generally arrayed along North Calais Road, between its junction with Upper Road in the north and just beyond Nelson Pond Road in the south. A second, smaller axis of buildings are found along Upper Road, running south from the same junction to Dondone Road, a short spur that crosses Pekin Brook to the join the two major roads. Part of the district is also found along the GAR Road, which runs northwest along the southern shore of Mirror Lake. Almost all of the buildings in this area are residential wood-frame structures, 1-1/2 to 2 1/2 stories in height. Most are Greek Revival in style. Non-residential buildings include a village hall and general store. Foundational remnants and ruins of the area's mills, and of a large early tavern, are found lining the banks of Pekin Brook.

North Calais is one of the rural community's five village centers, which all arose in some isolation from one another due to the folded hilly terrain. The earliest documented mills on Pekin Brook date to the early 19th century. The village benefited in the mid-19th century from the abundant waterpower to provide a number of services to the surrounding rural areas, including the processing of wool from sheep, which became a major industry in Vermont in the 19th century. The village also benefited from its presence on the stagecoach route between Montpelier and Newport, continuing north into Canada. The village was bypassed by railroad development in the late 19th century, and its relatively small mills declined in the early 20th century, the buildings eventually succumbing to fire, neglect, and demolition. A number of the village's higher quality homes were built by the various mill owners.

== See also ==
- National Register of Historic Places listings in Washington County, Vermont
