= Plainfield Village Historic District =

Historic district in Vermont, United States

- U.S. National Register of Historic Places
- U.S. Historic district
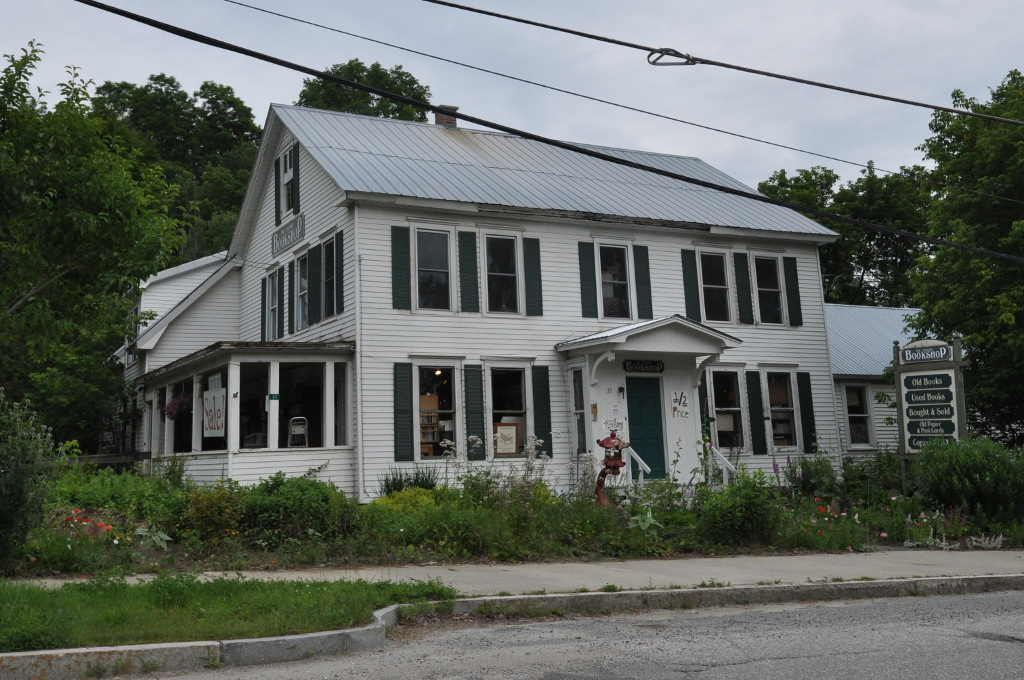

- Location within Vermont Location within the United States
- Location: High, School, Main and Water Sts., and Brook Rd., Plainfield and Marshfield, Vermont
- Coordinates: 44°16′43″N 72°25′32″W
- Area: 37.5 acres (15.2 ha)
- Architectural style: Greek Revival, Italianate
- NRHP reference No.: 83003223
- Added to NRHP: February 3, 1983

The Plainfield Village Historic District encompasses a significant portion of the village of Plainfield, Vermont. Located in northernmost Plainfield on United States Route 2 (and extending a shortway into adjacent Marshfield), the village grew in the 19th century as a mill town and service community for the surround agricultural areas, and has a well-preserved collection of Greek Revival and Italianate architecture. It was listed on the National Register of Historic Places in 1983.

== Description and history ==
The town of Plainfield is located in the Winooski River valley east of Montpelier, the state capital. Its northernmost corner is crossed by US 2, which follows the river valley. At the river's confluence with Great Brook, a waterfall provided power for grist and sawmills in the late 18th century. The village arose around this mill privilege, lining the main road on the north side of the river, across the river in the area northeast of the confluence. Despite a number of fires and floods that destroyed the mills, they were repeatedly rebuilt, and other industries also arose to take advantage of the water power. Today, only the dam on the river remains as a reminder of this industrial past. The village now acts as a service center for nearby Goddard College, and for commuters to Montpelier.

The historic district extends along US 2 between Towne Avenue in the west and roughly Hillside Drive in Marshfield to the east. It extends across the river along Main Street to Creamery Street, and along River Street just across Great Brook. A modest number of commercial buildings are clustered along US 2 and Main Street, while most of the remaining buildings are residential. The most common architectural styles are the Greek Revival and Italianate styles of the mid-19th century, when the village was at its economic height, and include an unusually large number of brick houses. Public buildings include the town hall (a Greek Revival former Universalist church) and library, as well as the local Methodist church (also Greek Revival, 1852).

== See also ==
- National Register of Historic Places listings in Washington County, Vermont
