= Waterbury Center, Vermont =

Census-designated place in Vermont, United States

- Census-designated place
- Location within Vermont Location within the United States
- Coordinates: 44°22′32″N 72°43′18″W
- Country: United States
- State: Vermont
- County: Washington
- Town: Waterbury

Area
  - Total: 0.44 sq mi (1.13 km^{2})
  - Land: 0.44 sq mi (1.13 km^{2})
  - Water: 0 sq mi (0.0 km^{2})
- Elevation: 650 ft (200 m)

Population (2020)
  - Total: 390
- Time zone: UTC-5 (Eastern (EST))
  - Summer (DST): UTC-4 (EDT)
- ZIP Code: 05677
- Area code: 802
- FIPS code: 50-77050
- GNIS feature ID: 2807156

Waterbury Center is an unincorporated village and census-designated place (CDP) in the town of Waterbury, Washington County, Vermont, United States. As of the 2020 census, it had a population of 390.

== Geography ==
The CDP is in northwestern Washington County, east of the geographic center of the town of Waterbury, 3.5 miles (5.6 km) north of the main village of Waterbury. Vermont Route 100 runs through the west side of Waterbury Center, leading south to Interstate 89 at Waterbury village and north 6 miles (10 km) to Stowe. The community is bordered to the west by Waterbury Center State Park, on the east arm of Waterbury Reservoir, an impoundment on the Little River, which flows south to the Winooski River west of Waterbury village.

== Education ==
It is in the Harwood Unified Union School District. The district's comprehensive high school is Harwood Union Middle and High School.

== Notable people ==
- Jake Blauvelt, American professional snowboarder
