= Woodbury Granite Company =

Quarry in New England

Coordinates: 44.4388°N 72.3942°W

- Type: Private
- Industry: Granite
- Founded: 1887 in Woodbury, Vermont, US
- Headquarters: Hardwick, Vermont, US
- Area served: United States
- Key people: George H. Bickford
- Products: architectural granite; mausoleums, monuments
- Total equity: US$ 1,000,000 (1917)
- Number of employees: 1,400 (1914)

The Woodbury Granite Company (WGC) was a producer of rough and finished granite products. Incorporated in 1887, purchased and significantly reorganized in 1896, and expanded by merger in 1902 and thereafter, the company operated quarries principally in Woodbury, Vermont, but its headquarters and stone-finishing facilities were located in nearby Hardwick. Beginning as a quarrier and seller of rough stone, the company expanded into the business of finishing cut stone and grew from there. It made its name as a supplier of architectural (structural) granite, and grew to become the United States' largest producer, supplying the stone for many notable buildings, including several state capitols, numerous post offices, and many office buildings.

With the growing national economy and civic and community pride spurring the construction of many granite public buildings, the company flourished in the years around 1910. Changes in architectural styles and in building techniques during the following years greatly harmed the market for architectural granite, and the company's coarser-grained stone could not compete with competitors' finer-grained granite for carving monuments and gravestones, nor could the company compete with the established actors in that market. The company went into decline, which was exacerbated by the Great Depression, and ceased operations in 1935.

== Background ==
The Green Mountains of Vermont have long been known for the quantity and quality of their granite, marble, and slate, but Vermont's remoteness, transportation problems, and difficulties in carving the hard stone (in the case of granite), largely prevented the development of a cut stone industry. In the early 19th century, Vermont granite was used locally for building. Originally, granite was collected from exposed outcrops and "boulder quarries"; only later did it become necessary to cut stone from the ground. The early granite industry in New England was dominated by coastal companies, which were able to ship their products by water. This situation lasted until the middle of the 19th century, when some marble quarries were opened in the Hardwick area. The increasing affluence of the United States in the 1880s and 1890s created a market for marble and granite that sparked the development of the industry in northern Vermont. The first "granite shed" (stone trimming and finishing facility (Note: Although they were large—perhaps 30,000 square feet (2,800 m^{2})—the finishing facilities were called "sheds" for their open layouts and cathedral-like ceilings.)) was completed in Hardwick in 1870. Granite quarries were opened on Robeson Mountain (Vermont's largest deposit of building granite, with a deposit measuring some 2 1/2 × 4 1/2 miles (4 × 7.2 km)) in nearby Woodbury in the 1870s, but transportation limitations prevented much development of the industry.

A large stone is cut in the Woodbury quarry.

The construction of the Portland & Ogdensburg Railroad (later the St. Johnsbury and Lake Champlain Railroad) to Hardwick in 1872 made it possible to ship granite in quantity from northern Vermont to the outside world, opening new markets. The railroad later built a short spur, the Hardwick Branch, from Granite Junction (near the northwestern edge of Hardwick village) south through the stonecutting district along Cooper Brook, toward Woodbury. Hardwick became a granite-cutting center, although much of the granite finished there was actually from elsewhere, such as Woodbury, the town some six miles (10 km) to the south.

Largely inspired by the World's Columbian Exposition (and especially its "White City") in 1893, granite became a popular building material for commercial and government buildings and other structures. In the era of the robber barons, the Beaux Arts style imparted to public buildings a sense of grandeur that invited proud governments and wealthy patrons to demonstrate their wealth and public benevolence in a way rarely seen before. While the finer-grained granite of Barre was preferred for monuments and gravestones, the coarser-grained Woodbury stone found a market in "architectural" uses such as buildings and paving, (Note: "Coarse" granite typically has feldspars over 0.4 inches (10 mm), while "medium" granite has those under 0.4 in and over 0.2 inches (5.1 mm) and "fine" under 0.2 in.) for which the Barre stone was too expensive. In addition, the northern stone had greater compressive strength than Barre's, making it preferable for construction of larger, heavier structures such as buildings, bridges, and mausoleums.

== Incorporation ==
The Voodry & Town granite quarry, located on the side of Robeson Mountain in Woodbury, was opened in 1880. Charles A. Watson, George O. Woodcock, and W.H. Fullerton incorporated the Woodbury Granite Company (WGC) in 1887. In 1888, after buying the Voodry & Town quarry, the WGC began operations there; this quarry came to be known as the Gray Quarry for the color of its stone. The quarry yielded a supply of large, defect-free slabs of uniformly-grained, medium-gray granite, which were well-adapted for building. The company sold these rough-hewn stones to other companies, which finished them by trimming, cutting, and polishing the stone. In time, Ernest Fletcher, who owned the first Woodbury Quarry, acquired much of the Woodbury Company's stock.

John S. Holden was president of the company, but was not involved in its day-to-day operations.

George H. Bickford was secretary and treasurer, and later general manager, of the company.

The increase in demand for architectural granite ran up against bottlenecks in the supply chain, particularly in the transportation of quarried stone to cutting houses. By 1894, the Hardwick and Woodbury Railroad (H&W RR) was incorporated to transport granite from the Woodbury quarries (in particular the Carter and WGC quarries at Robeson Mountain) to the stone finishing sheds in Hardwick and the St. Johnsbury & Lake Champlain Railroad. Although enough capital was raised to begin construction of the H&W Railroad in 1895, the money ran out before the railroad was completed. Ernest Fletcher, the new owner of the Carter quarry, attempted to persuade the Town of Hardwick to buy railroad stock to fund the rest of the construction of the line, but in three successive votes, the town declined, amid a consensus that the quarry owners, not the town, would benefit.

In July of the same year, John S. Holden and Charles W. Leonard purchased the Woodbury Granite Company; this event would greatly affect Hardwick and Woodbury. The company had not been enjoying great success simply selling rough quarry blocks to others for finishing; the value of its product was likely too small, and the difficulty of transporting it too great. Holden had owned a Pennsylvania oil refinery that he sold to the Standard Oil Co.; he reinvested the oil proceeds in textile mills and succeeded there as well, so he had considerable money to put into his next venture.

Leonard was a businessman with a number of interests, and had been a partner with Holden in a Bennington woolen mill. He went on to become a director of the Waltham Watch Company and a holding company for streetcar operations. The textile business was cooling, and the two were looking to diversify their investments. The reorganized Woodbury Granite Company was capitalized at US$150,000; its officers included Holden as president and Holden's son-in-law, George H. Bickford, as secretary and treasurer. Bickford was the only one of the three who was actively involved in the running of the company; the others were "silent partners". Holden's brother, Daniel, was assigned to the quarry and set about modernizing it; the new owners quickly installed two 75-ton derricks.

After both Hardwick and Woodbury declined to help fund the completion of the H&W RR, Messrs. Holden and Leonard bought enough shares in the railroad to insure its construction to the quarries. With their purchase, control of the railroad passed from Fletcher and his allies, and the WGC became its plurality shareholder. People in Woodbury, especially, were concerned with this shift of control, but the railroad gave assurances of equal treatment of all local granite companies, and agreed to provide free switch connections in its first year. By 1897, the railroad was completed to the top of Robeson Mountain and the Woodbury quarries. Bickford replaced Daniel Holden as superintendent of the WGC in 1898. The quarries developed rapidly, and Woodbury Granite's success was secured.

== Expansion ==
Sanborn Fire Insurance map of the company's granite finishing facilities (right), 1905.

The availability of reliable, inexpensive transportation of granite from the hillside quarries to the Hardwick finishing sheds was vital to the growth and development of the local granite industry in Hardwick and Woodbury. In addition, the ability to transport heavy machinery to the quarries allowed the cutting of larger blocks of stone, which could be taken away by the railroad. While the WGC had previously sold rough quarry blocks, Holden, Leonard, and Bickford chose to expand into manufacturing finished building granite. With a quarry railroad at their disposal and the prospect of electric power (Hardwick Village had approved a municipal power plant in July), they decided in 1897 to locate granite finishing facilities in Hardwick village. in 1898, George Bickford moved his family to Hardwick. Bickford, More & Co. was incorporated in 1899 to finish the granite quarried by the WGC. Charles H. More owned a large and successful granite company in Montpelier, and made a good partner for Bickford. An experienced producer of finished granite for both monumental and building uses, he brought stonecutting know-how to the partnership; Holden and Leonard were silent partners in this enterprise as well. Bickford served as general manager of the company and directed the construction of an important granite finishing facility in Hardwick. This originally consisted of a large linear shed (Shed No. 1) as well as a semi-circular shed (No. 2). The first shed was 200 feet (61 m) long. The sheds were located near the H&W RR tracks between the electric generating station at the southern edge of Hardwick village and the railroad's junction with the St. Johnsbury & Lake Champlain Railroad at Granite Junction, near the northwest corner of the village.

Bickford, More & Co. was an immediate success. Beginning with small monuments and architectural details, the company expanded into small buildings. With the construction of the second shed, additional workers were hired and more equipment purchased. A powerhouse was built in an annex. In 1902, Bickford, More & Co. was merged into the WGC, which became an integrated company that could both quarry the stone and finish it.

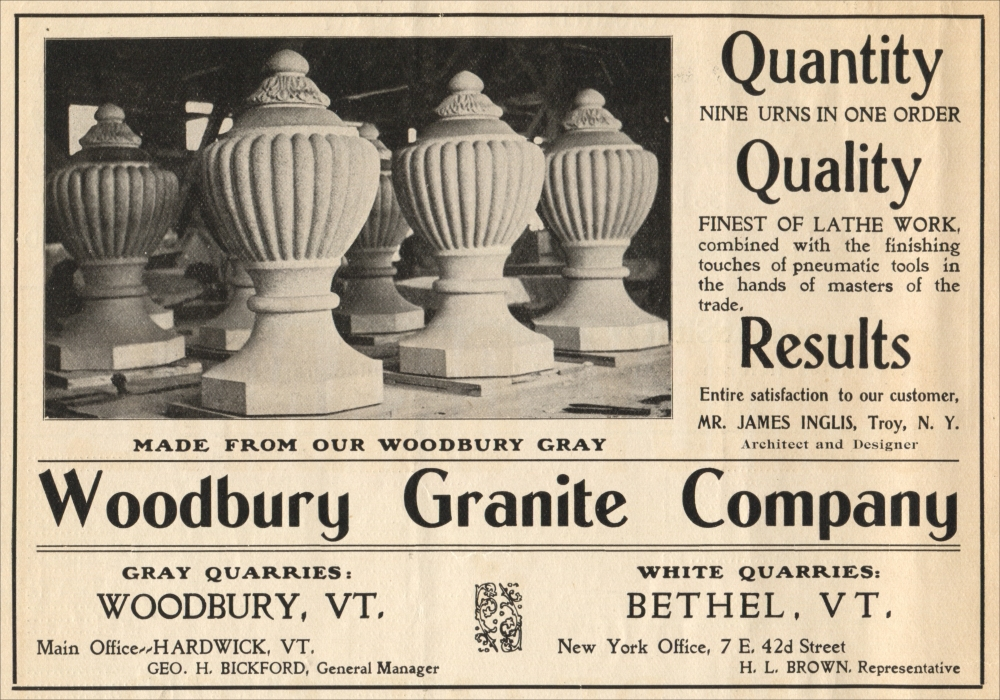
The company began with small carving jobs, as shown by this advertisement in the Monumental News of April 1903.

The newly-consolidated WGC moved quickly to build its capacity. Shed No. 1 was enlarged and two more straight sheds (Sheds 3 and 4) were constructed nearby. Boxing shops, air compressor houses, boiler and grinding rooms, gang saw and surfacer sheds, and carpentry and machine shops were constructed. In 1906, the company built an additional circular shed (No. 5) to house carvers whose work included column capitals, panels, ornamentation, statuary, and lettering. Eight railroad spurs ran across the 870-foot (265 m) long stone yard; an overhead traveling crane allowed 16 railroad cars to be unloaded and loaded simultaneously. With the confidence and backing of his father-in-law, Bickford was able to make the needed investments to undertake and complete execute large projects. The company made major investments in machinery and tools for its finishing sheds and quarries. To power them, it built its own hydropower facility, supplementing the village's plant.

According to historian Paul Wood, the company's name was made when it won the contract to provide finished granite for the new Pennsylvania State Capitol building in 1903. The contract, at the time the largest building granite contract in history, called for the delivery and setting of 400,000 cubic feet (11,000 m^{3}) of finished stone in the extraordinary span of 24 months. Many in the industry saw these terms as impossible to meet. The shareholders of the company pledged their personal fortunes to guarantee the company's performance, and the Woodbury company was awarded the contract. "Hardwick To Boom!" boasted the Hardwick Gazette on March 26. "$2,000,000 contract is secured for the Pennsylvania Capitol Building, Woodbury Gray Granite to be finished in Hardwick. Two years' work, Hundreds of new employees will be needed." The size of the capitol contract can be surmised by comparison to the value of Vermont's combined granite output in 1909: $2,811,744. (Note: That is the federal government's figure, which has been questioned. The Vermont State Geologist opined that the actual figures were "very much greater".) In less than eight months, finished stone began arriving on site in Pennsylvania. In the second year of the contract, thirty one-piece columns, 30 feet (9.1 m) high, were quarried, finished, and delivered. The entire contract was fulfilled in 22 months—two months early. The general contractors, George F. Payne & Son, wrote the WGC to "express our great satisfaction at the manner in which you have handled your work, and think we can safely say, so far as the execution of the granite work is concerned, it was the quickest piece of work ever done." The WGCs reputation was made.

== Florescence ==
George Bickford was both an excellent salesman and a competent administrator, notes Wood. He selected able managers who could be trusted to run the company while he was away selling its products. In 1903, the same year as the Pennsylvania Capitol contract, WGC began work at its Bethel White Quarry (still in operation) and also built a finishing shed in Bethel. Bethel White Granite, described as the world's whitest granite, is also one of the physically hardest and thus most difficult to obtain (the white stone is so reflective that many quarry workers would wear dark glasses). In 1906, WGC built a second and larger finishing shed at Bethel. Seven years later, in 1913, the company bought the E.B. Ellis Co. white quarry in Bethel and its cutting plant in Northfield after the Ellis company went bankrupt as a consequence of poor estimating on a bid. The Ellis company's auditor, George James, became WGC's assistant general manager and secretary-treasurer.

The company made the most of its success in building state capitols.

Riding on its fame after the Pennsylvania Capitol success, WGC won a set of large building contracts, including the Cook County (Illinois) Courthouse (1906), the Wisconsin State Capitol (1907), the City Hall-County Building in Chicago (1908, including 36 columns 75 feet (23 m) high and 9.333 feet (2.845 m) in diameter—at the time the world's largest Corinthian orders), and the Bankers Trust Co. building, built in 1910 on the most expensive parcel of land in New York City. Woodbury Gray granite became a benchmark and industry standard. That name and others were trademarked by the WGC. A point of particular pride was the construction of Hardwick's Memorial Building (dedicated 1913), built by the company of local stone cut by local stonecutters.

The company grew rapidly: it employed 132 people in 1900, which became 500 in 1905, and 800 in 1911. By 1914, WGC had a total of 1,400 employees in multiple quarries in Woodbury and Bethel and cutting and finishing plants in Hardwick, Bethel and Northfield. As of 1911, it had four million dollars of unfinished work on its books and had begun subcontracting work to other granite companies in Hardwick as well as to companies as far away as Concord, New Hampshire, and Westerly, Rhode Island. In 1912, the company signed 117 new building contracts—one every three days—including for 32 office buildings, 19 mausoleums, 14 banks and post offices, and five railroad stations, as well as hotels, courthouses, and private residences. The same year, it opened its White quarry in Woodbury, allowing it to sell a wider range of stone. "Hardwick White" became another of its brands.

The last day of 1912 saw WGC's stone-setting crews working on these projects throughout the eastern United States: the Washington, D.C., Post Office; the Wisconsin State Capitol; the Miners Bank Building (Wilkes-Barre, Pennsylvania); the Turk's Head Building (Providence, R.I.); the Northwest Mutual Life Building (Milwaukee, Wisconsin); and Soldiers & Sailors Memorials in Wichita, Kansas, Bloomington, Illinois, and Princeton, Illinois. In 1913, the Woodbury Granite Company was the largest granite business in the world under a single management. In 1914, its annual payroll was reported to be more than one million dollars. That year, the company published a booklet of photos of "some of the buildings and monuments" built with its stone, opposite accolades from architects, contractors, and owners. By 1917, the company had supplied the granite for seven state capitol buildings: Pennsylvania, Wisconsin, Kentucky, Michigan, Iowa, Idaho, and Kansas.

Recognizing the importance of carved stone (as opposed to simply cut blocks and shapes), in 1906 the company built a shed to be occupied by carvers and sculptors alone. This shed had roof doors, which allowed a derrick to deposit stone directly at the carvers' work stations, eliminating the need to move the stone by hand through side doors (a process known as shedding in). By 1910, George Bickford had recruited Frederick A. Purdy, an established sculptor in the Midwest, to come to Hardwick and take charge of all of the company's carving business, likely as an independent contractor. By 1912, the company had built an addition to the carvers' shed. In the period from mid-1915 to mid-1918, Purdy employed nearly two dozen carvers, many of them Italians trained in the sculpture schools of their homeland.

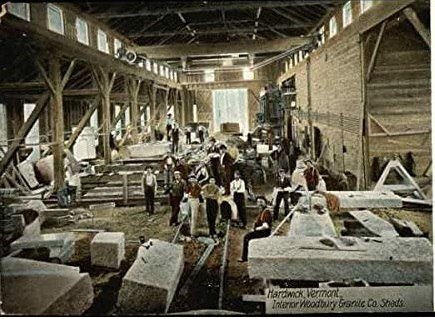
The interior of a granite cutting shed (probably Shed No. 1), as depicted in a contemporary postcard.

As the granite industry grew, it began to outstrip the local power supply. Although the WGC owned its own generation plant, it also bought electricity from the Village of Hardwick. In 1911, the electric lights in the village began to flicker at night; an investigation blamed the municipal generating station and proposed damming a nearby creek to provide a steady supply of water. At least one granite company, concerned about the reliability of the electric system, moved to a nearby town. The WGC, looking to expand its capacity, proposed to lease and operate the municipal power plants; the offer alarmed the owners of the other, smaller granite companies, but the management abilities of George Bickford were well known to the Village government, which approved a management contract in 1912. Fearful of the company's influence, the "old guard" of the village allied with the smaller granite operators, and a purchase option was struck from the management contract. When the contract expired in 1917, the world was a different place, and it was not renewed.

In 1917, the WGC was capitalized at one million dollars, more money than the next seven Vermont granite companies combined. The company owned or controlled each of the elements of the chain needed to produce and deliver its product: quarries, the quarry railroad, and cutting plants, as well as the water rights, hydropower, and steam electric generating plants to power them, timberlands and a sawmill, a bank, piece-setting crews, and branch sales offices in New York, Chicago, and Washington. By controlling each step of the process, it could assure its ability to meet contract deadlines and estimate costs accurately—which further enabled it to win contracts and assure predictable profits. The company did not design buildings, but upon winning a contract, it assumed complete responsibility for a project, turning architectural drawings into designs for hundreds of cut stones, producing the stones, and sending crews to construction sites to assemble the stones.

That same year, the company won a contract to build the Forest Lawn Memorial Park mausoleum in Maplewood, Minnesota. The showpiece of this structure is a 20-foot (6 m) wide bas-relief carving of the Last Supper in the style of Leonardo da Vinci's painting in the pediment. Four weeks were devoted to making the models for the piece, which was done by Purdy and his principal assistant. Another five weeks were consumed by the rough carving, and the faces, hair, hands, and clothing took ten weeks, although some of that time overlapped with the roughing-out. Also overlapping was the final carving with pneumatic tools, which was done for six weeks, with the final hand carving by the highest-paid carver lasting two weeks. The work was carved in four sections, which were crated, shipped, and installed in the front of the building between two smaller side pieces.

== Decline ==
Wood notes that four factors can be seen to have combined to cause the decline of the Woodbury Granite Company. George H. Bickford died unexpectedly in 1914 at the age of 45 after appendicitis surgery. He was succeeded as general manager by William C. Clifford, manager of the Bethel branch, who shifted the focus of the company from Hardwick to Bethel and eventually bought the company. The loss of its highly competent manager and ace salesman set the stage for the decline of the WGC. The same year, World War I broke out. While the United States stayed out of the war until 1917, the turning of American manufacturing towards production of war material and the low priority of granite in wartime meant that new cutting and finishing equipment was nearly impossible to obtain. Building with granite slowed, and the Hardwick branch of the company became less active; in 1917, it suspended operations for a few months.

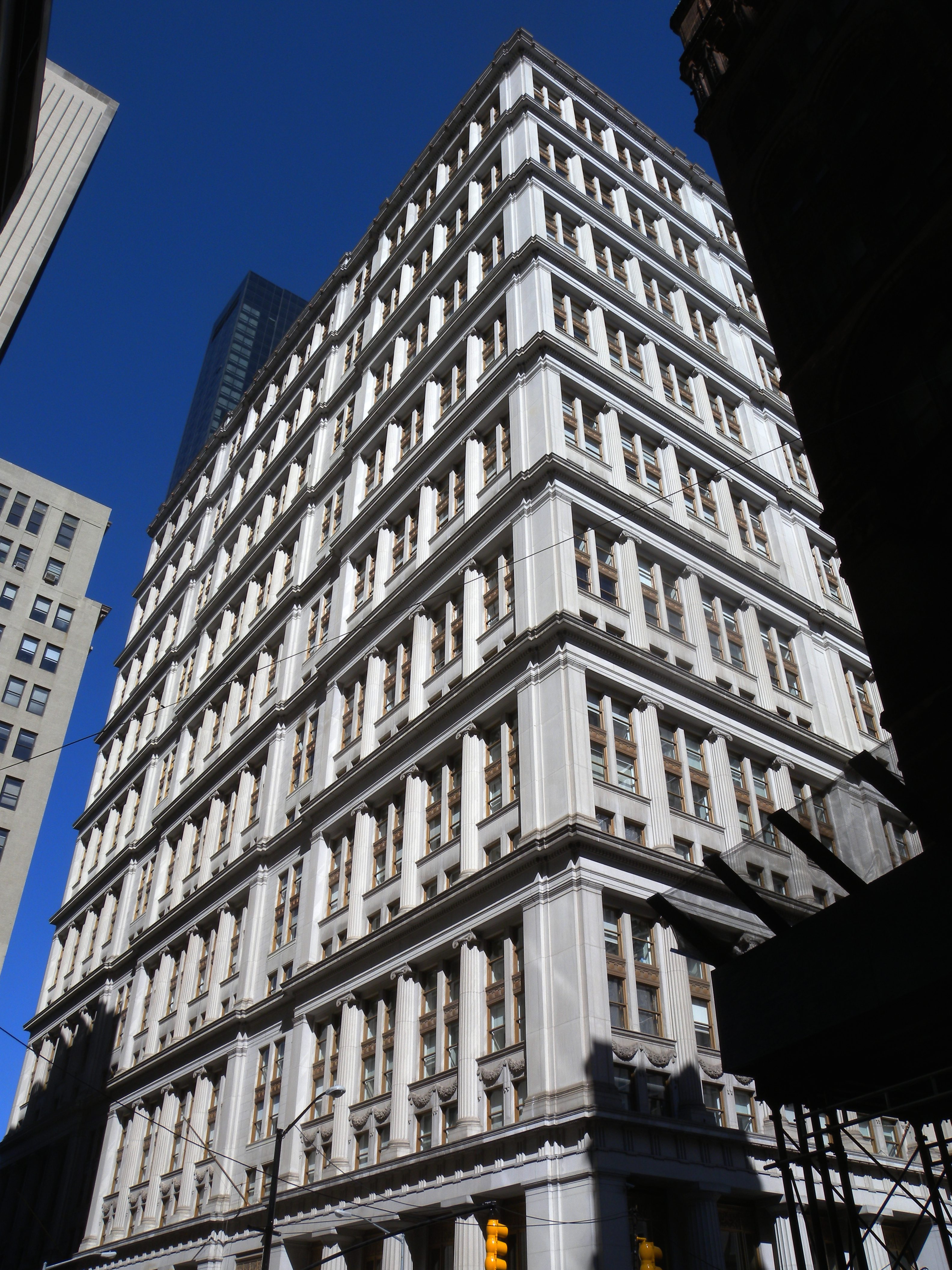
The Western Union/A.T.&T. Building in New York was the company's last large building. The extent of the architectural detailing can be seen in close-up.

The most significant factor in the company's decline, however, arose with a shift in construction techniques. In early stone buildings, the walls supported the whole weight of the structure. However, when land values in metropolitan areas rose, landowners were motivated to build taller and taller buildings. As the buildings grow taller, it becomes increasingly impractical to build bearing-wall buildings, because of both the cost of additional material and labor and on account of the loss of floor area and windows in the valuable lower stories because of the increasingly thick walls needed to support the much heavier building. The steel-framed "skyscraper" was—and still is—the solution. While granite was frequently used for the outsides of prestigious steel-frame buildings, the stone blocks of facing stones (ashlars) were 4 to 12 inches (10 to 30 cm) thick—much smaller than those used in bearing-wall construction. These required much less stone, so demand for granite fell. In addition, other, lower-cost materials were increasingly used for the façades of buildings. The A.T.&T. building in New York, constructed in 1922, was the last large building the company built.

After Bickford's death, his successors seem to have lost interest in carving over time. Despite the promotion of monuments, Frederick Purdy's carving sheds were listed as vacant in 1922, although it appears that he was working elsewhere in Hardwick for some time afterwards

As the building granite market declined, the WGC shifted to monuments and mausoleums. This put it in direct competition with well-established monumental granite centers, such as Barre. While the WGC had opened its Woodbury "Blue" quarry in 1911, and promoted that stone as "Imperial Blue Granite for high-class polished monuments" and "The blue that never fades", it did not succeed. In 1924, however, the company reopened the Blue Quarry and instituted an aggressive promotional campaign through retailers. The company produced catalogs and brochures to help sell gravestones and monuments and instituted the "Memorock" brand for memorials, monuments and mausoleums. Other granite cutters boasted that they used Woodbury stone, and the company was big enough that two of its products, Woodbury Gray and Bethel White, were used as comparisons in advertisements for other granite companies. However, the WGC struggled in competition with the established monument granite companies. The company was reorganized in 1927; W.C. Clifford was its president. The next year, however, F.L. Hardy became the company's president, and corporate headquarters were moved to Bennington.

The final blow was the Great Depression, which saw a collapse in the economy in general, but in the market for luxury goods (such as mausoleums) in particular. Building granite was an unattainably extravagant product for nearly everybody, and the company had nothing else to sell. In 1935, the Woodbury Granite Company closed its operations and sold its finishing plant and its quarry facilities to John B. Hall & Associates. The company had been in business 48 years, and its decline had taken some two decades.

== Legacy ==
Shed No. 4 is the company's only surviving finishing shed.

In 1952, the company's Shed No. 1 burned down. The building was a total loss because granite sheds were built almost entirely of wood; once a fire became established, it was nearly impossible to extinguish. A few small-scale granite businesses continued to operate in Hardwick after 1952, but the loss of Woodbury Shed No. 1 marked the symbolic end of the town's granite industry. Although at least one Robeson Mountain quarry continues to operate, there are no operating granite finishing facilities left in Hardwick.

The Swenson Granite Works, of Concord, New Hampshire, bought the closed Woodbury quarry in the 1950s. The quarry was later reopened to supply stone for an expansion of the Pennsylvania State Capitol Complex. Woodbury Gray granite is still marketed under that name. Thanks to a revival of interest in granite furnishings, particularly in residential use, the Woodbury quarry (Latitude 44.4392°, Longitude -72.39391° (WGS84)) produces about 500,000 cubic feet (14,000 m^{3}) of stone a year. Woodbury Gray is promoted as being good for building stone and monuments, as well as such modern uses as countertops, sinks, pool coping, sills, ornamental stone, walls, floors, paving, and design projects.

The last surviving granite shed, Woodbury Granite Company's Shed No. 4, still stands in Hardwick. All of the others have been lost, principally to fire. Shed No. 4 has been empty for decades, in a state of arrested decay. There are plans to revive it as a community center.

== Buildings ==
Buildings and structures built with stone supplied by the Woodbury Granite Company include:

Iowa State Capitol (steps and platforms)

Kentucky State Capitol (base course and interior polished columns)

Pennsylvania State Capitol (1903)

Wisconsin State Capitol

Michigan State Capitol

Idaho State Capitol

Kansas State Capitol

City Hall-County Building, Chicago, Illinois

Cleveland City Hall, Ohio

Des Moines City Hall, Iowa

Hartford City Hall, Connecticut

Youngstown, Ohio, City Hall

Essex County Court House, Newark, New Jersey

Mahoning County Court House, Youngstown, Ohio

Post Office, Court House, and Custom House, Providence, R.I.

Post Office, Grand Rapids, Michigan

Post Office, Minneapolis, Minnesota

Post Office, New Bedford, Massachusetts

Post Office, Hamilton, Ohio

Post Office, Washington, D.C.

American Bank Note Company Building, New York

Bank of Amityville, Amityville, New York

Bank of Portsmouth, Virginia

Bank of the Ohio Valley, Wheeling, West Virginia

Bankers Trust Co. Building, New York City

Belleville Savings Bank, Belleville, Illinois

Bridgeport Trust Company, Bridgeport, Connecticut

Citizens Bank, Michigan City, Indiana

Citizens National Bank, Wooster, Ohio

Citizens Savings Bank, Cedar Falls, Iowa

Commonwealth Trust Company, Pittsburgh, Pennsylvania

First National Bank, Creston, Iowa

First National Bank, Lidgerwood, North Dakota

Franklin Savings Institutions, Greenfield, Massachusetts

Importers & Traders National Bank, New York, New York

Mahoning National Bank, Youngstown, Ohio

Merchants and Illinois National Bank, Peoria, Illinois

Miners Bank, Wilkes-Barre, Pennsylvania

National Savings Bank, New Haven, Connecticut

Ohio National Bank, Columbus, Ohio

Old Colony Trust Co. Building, Rochester, New York

Peninsular Bank, Detroit, Michigan

People's Bank, McKeesport, Pennsylvania

Peoples Savings Bank, Toledo, Ohio

Title Guarantee & Trust Co. Building, New York, New York

Union Trust Co. Building, Rochester, New York

Fergus Reid Building, Norfolk, Virginia

Glens Falls Insurance Co. Building, Glens Falls, New York

Insurance Exchange, Chicago, Illinois

Masonic Temple, 115 Eastern Avenue, St. Johnsbury, Vermont

Northwestern Mutual Life Insurance Co. Building, Minneapolis, Minnesota

Rike-Kumler Building, Dayton, Ohio

Rothschild Building, Chicago, Illinois

S. Phillipson Building, Chicago, Illinois

Turk's Head Building, Providence, Rhode Island

Western Union/A.T.&T. Building (1922), New York, New York.

Burlington Station, Galesburg, Illinois

Union Station, Memphis, Tennessee

Union Station, Washington, D.C.

Syracuse University Library, Syracuse, New York

Syracuse University Gymnasium, Syracuse, New York

Kirby Hall of Civil Rights, Lafayette College, Easton, Pennsylvania

East High School, Des Moines, Iowa

High School, Grand Rapids, Michigan

High School, Omaha, Nebraska

City Hall Square Building, Chicago, Illinois

Flower Memorial, Watertown, New York

Governor Page Monument, Hyde Park, Vermont

Lowry Memorial, Minneapolis, Minnesota

Memorial Archway, Port Huron, New York

Memorial Building, Hardwick, Vermont

Museum of Fine Arts, Minneapolis, Minnesota

National Museum, Washington, D.C.

Navy Memorial, Vicksburg, Mississippi

Pendergast Memorial, Case Park, Kansas City, Missouri

Soldiers and Sailors Memorial, Princeton, Illinois

Soldiers and Sailors Memorial, Wichita, Kansas

Soldiers and Sailors Monument, Indiana

Soldiers and Sailors Monument, Bloomington, Illinois

Soldiers and Sailors Monument, Scranton, Pennsylvania

Soldiers Monument, Ashtabula, Ohio

Soldiers Monument, Manchester, Vermont

Boundary Channel Bridge, Washington, D.C.

Forest Lawn Mausoleum, Maplewood, Minnesota

State Memorial Building, Topeka, Kansas (base)

Church of the Immaculate Conception, Minneapolis, Minnesota

Pro-Cathedral, Minneapolis, Minnesota

Carnegie Library, Syracuse, New York

Connecticut State Library, Hartford, Connecticut

Homeopathic Hospital, Pittsburgh, Pennsylvania

Hotel Pontchartrain, Detroit, Michigan

National Hotel, Rochester, New York

Harry Payne Whitney Residence, New York, New York

Mandell Residence, Boston, Massachusetts

Mullane Residence, New York, New York

Bureau of Engraving and Printing, Washington, D.C.
