= Hardwick and Woodbury Railroad =

American railway line in Vermont

Coordinates: 44.5057°N 72.3737°W

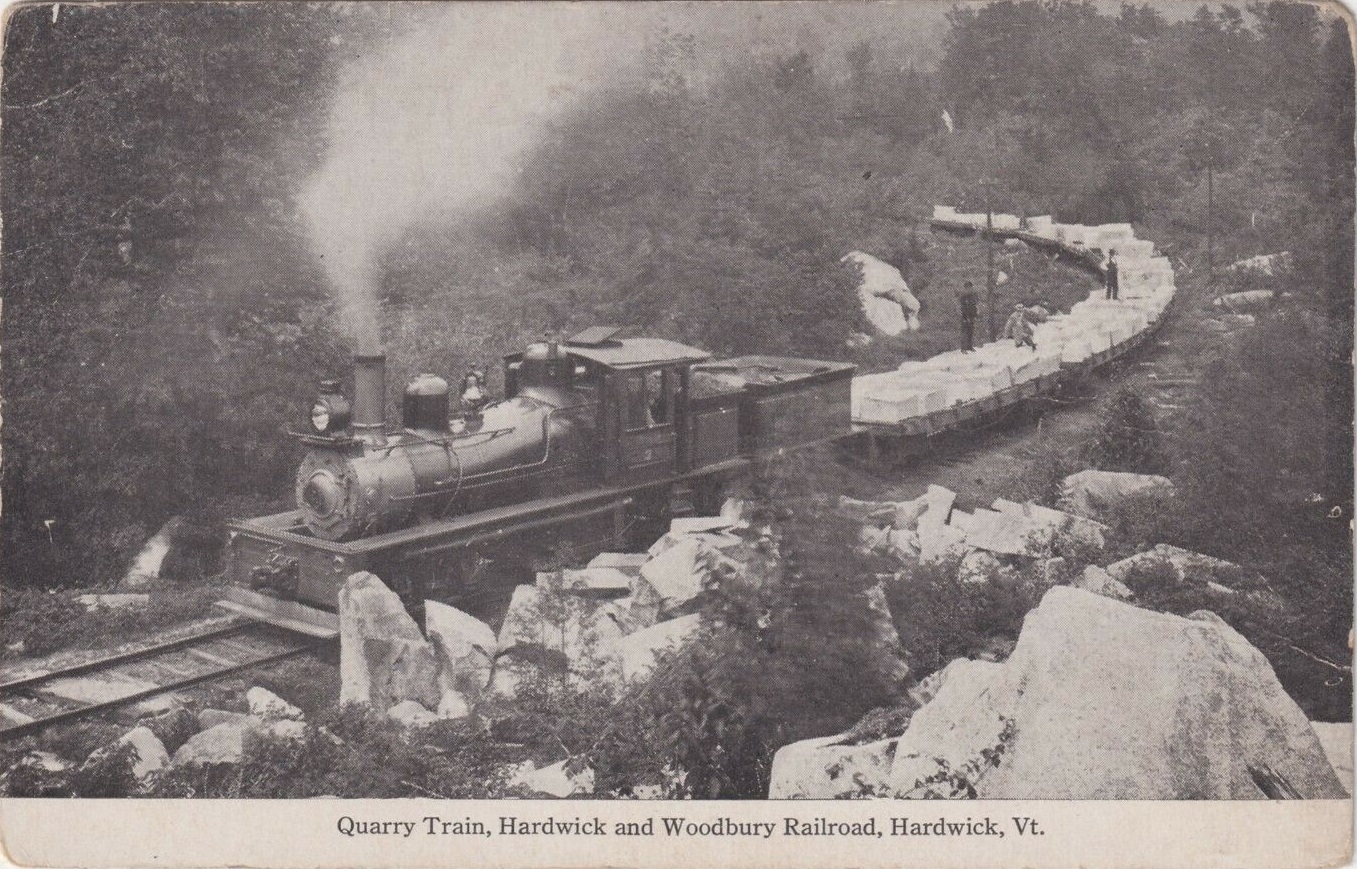
- Hardwick & Woodbury locomotive No. 3 pulls a quarry train, as depicted on a 1917 postcard.

Overview
- Headquarters: Hardwick, Vermont, US
- Locale: Vermont
- Dates of operation: 1897–1934
- Successor: (abandoned)

Technical
- Track gauge: 4 ft 8 1/2 in (1,435 mm) standard gauge
- Length: 9 miles (14 kilometres) mainline, including leased track

The Hardwick and Woodbury Railroad (H&WRR, or H&W) was a short-line railroad serving the towns of Hardwick and Woodbury, Vermont. Built to serve the local granite industry by bringing rough stone from the quarries to the cutting-houses, the railroad was about 7 miles (11 km) long, plus leased track, extended to about 11 miles (18 km) at its greatest extent. It connected with only one other railroad, the St. Johnsbury & Lake Champlain, in Hardwick.

The business arc of the Hardwick & Woodbury was typical of most short line, single-industry railroads. Built as an industrial road in 1895–1897, the line never grew beyond the granite industry, and its fortunes largely followed those of the Woodbury Granite Company, its principal customer and plurality shareholder. With the slump in demand for architectural granite, and especially large stones, caused by changes in building construction techniques and then the Great Depression, the railroad ceased operations and abandoned its track in 1934. The rails were removed in 1940, and little trace remains of the railroad today.

== Background ==
The Green Mountains of Vermont have long been known for the quantity and quality of their granite and marble, but the weight of the stone combined with difficulty of carving granite largely prevented the development of a stone-cutting industry in northern Vermont until some marble quarries opened in the Hardwick area in the middle of the 19th century. The first "finishing shed," where the rough-hewn stone was cut, shaped and polished, was built in Hardwick in 1870. Granite quarries opened on Robeson Mountain in nearby Woodbury, Vermont’s largest deposit of building granite, in the 1870s but transportation limitations prevented much development of the industry.

A team of twenty horses and oxen hauling granite on the main street of Hardwick Village, c. 1895. Such traffic caused ongoing damage to the village streets and led to the building of the quarry railroad.

The construction of the Portland and Ogdensburg Railway to Hardwick in 1872 (it later became the St. Johnsbury and Lake Champlain Railroad) enabled the shipping of quantities of northern Vermont stone to the outer world and facilitated the growth of the local granite industry. Though it had limited granite of its own, Hardwick became a granite-cutting center hosting a dozen sheds finishing granite by 1890. Rough-cut granite was brought from the quarries to and through the town in heavy horse-drawn wagons, which caused congestion and damaged roads and bridges. In 1892, after pressure from both civic leaders and quarry owners, the railroad built the Hardwick Branch, also known as the Quarry Railroad, a spur from Granite Junction near the western edge of Hardwick village to Buffalo Crossing by the southern fringe of the village. This eliminated granite-carrying wagons from the village’s central streets. Over time, it also concentrated the granite industry in five clusters along the Hardwick Branch at Lower Wolcott St., at West End, at Woodbury Granite Co., at E.R. Fletcher Granite Co., and at Buffalo Crossing.

Largely as a result of the World’s Columbian Exposition in 1893, granite became a very popular building material for commercial and government buildings. While the finer-grained granite of Barre was preferred for monuments and gravestones, the coarser-grained Woodbury stone found a market in "architectural" uses such as buildings and paving. As demand grew, the granite-finishing operations in Hardwick began to look farther afield for sources of the raw stone. While some quarries had been opened in nearby Woodbury, transportation of the stone to the finishing sheds was problematic: it was slow and difficult, and caused significant damage to the roads. The limitations of horse-drawn wagons would prevent much further growth in the local industry. Ordinarily, a horse was needed for every ton of granite hauled by wagon. It once took an 18-horse team three days to move a large column of rough granite from the quarry to Hardwick (a distance of 6 miles (9.7 km) or more, depending on the route), after which 20 road culverts needed to be rebuilt. Such a team might be followed by a one-horse wagon loaded with axes, shovels, peavies, and other tools to repair the damage. Transportation was somewhat easier in the winter, as the frozen ground would not give way, and snow allowed the use of sleds, which encountered less friction.

The incorporation of the Village of Hardwick in 1891 and the new government’s interest in improving the community’s infrastructure, including its streets, intensified the interest in an alternative means of transportation for the granite. Meanwhile, the Village’s establishment of piped water, a fire department, and an electric department allowed for further growth of industry. The opening of a rail link to the competing Barre quarries raised the spectre of the local industry’s being out-competed. The St.J.&L.C. was asked to extend the Hardwick Branch to the quarries in Woodbury but, already in a weak financial condition and facing unfavorable economic conditions, declined.

== Incorporation and construction ==
Faced with lack of interest from other quarters, the quarry owners decided to build their own railroad. The Hardwick and Woodbury Railroad Company was chartered ("for the purpose, and with the right, of building a railroad... from some point on the St. Johnsbury & Lake Champlain R.R. in the town of Hardwick to the mountain quarry of the Woodbury Granite Company in the town of Woodbury" ) by an act of the state legislature November 23, 1894, with the stipulation that construction must begin within two years, and be completed in five. The company’s charter permitted the railroad to cease operations from December through March, although this did not happen. The corporation’s initial capital was set at $50,000, with an option to increase the amount "if necessary." The larger local granite companies and many of their officers bought stock, as did a number of townspeople. By 1902, the Fletcher Granite Co. owned one-third of the railroad’s stock. The new company held its first regular meeting in March 1895.

The rented Hinckley locomotive pushes a track-laying train toward Burnham Hill.

As the St. Johnsbury & Lake Champlain Railroad had already built the 1.7 miles (2.7 km) Hardwick Branch track to serve the granite sheds on the west side of Hardwick, construction of the new railroad began at the end of that spur, which was leased from the St.J.&L.C. for one dollar per year. The St.J.&L.C. also provided 56-pound (per yard, or 27.8 kg/m) rails, spikes, and ties for the new company to begin construction of its main line. The H&W rented some flat cars and a locomotive—a 4-4-0 Hinckley—from another regional railroad, the Boston & Maine, which was affiliated with the St.J.&L.C. A wooden derrick and rail header (track-laying crane) were built on one of the rented flat cars. This arrangement allowed two rails to be laid every nine minutes.

The route was surveyed in the summer of 1895. As local labor was used as much as possible, the actual work of grading the roadbed was delayed until the haying season was over. Much of the roadbed was cut from the sides of the hills, and grading was done with hand tools, wheelbarrows, and horse-drawn carts. Five miles of roadbed were graded in 1895, and the remainder was graded in the summer of 1896. Grading work came to a halt when the ground froze, and the first rails were laid thereafter. Wooden trestles were built to span gorges along the right of way. In a process that continued until 1904, the trestles were subsequently replaced with "grout" or waste stone, which was used to fill the ravines. The fill was "fine" grout from the cutting sheds, as large blocks falling could have destroyed the trestle structures. The largest—and last filled—of the gorges took 6,600 carloads of grout.

Varnum & Gilfillan, a St. Johnsbury-based contracting concern, was hired for culvert construction and trestle filling. This company brought Italian immigrant labor from Boston, preferring this source to the local farmers who also had farms to tend. A number of them stayed and worked in the granite finishing shops, becoming pillars of the community.

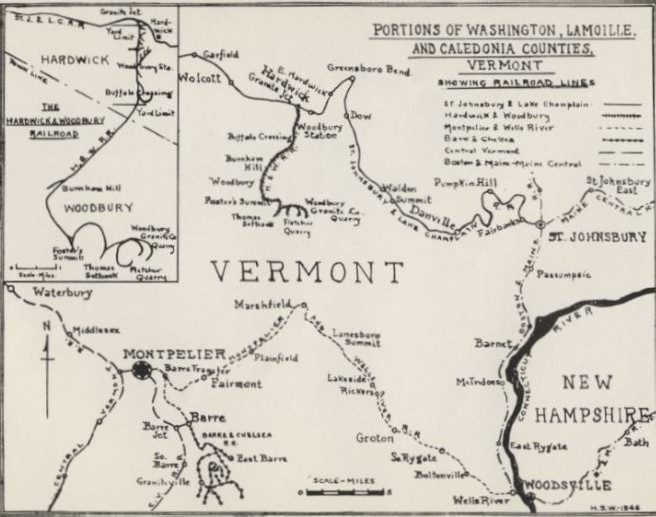
The Hardwick & Woodbury inset on a map of the railroads of northeastern Vermont, c. 1920.

Five miles of new track was constructed to a point known as Burnham Hill in Woodbury by 1896. By then, the rented B&M engine had reached the limit of its usefulness, and money ran short. Work wound down until the new owners of the Woodbury Granite Company (John S. Holden and Charles W. Leonard) bought enough stock in the railroad to become its principal (although not majority) shareholders and a Lima Locomotive Works Shay, bought from the Barre & Chelsea Railroad, arrived in mid-1897. The new locomotive was in poor condition, requiring some re-working to get it serviceable. It was given the number 1 and renamed "E. H. Blossom" in honor of the H&W’s General Manager.

The last few miles of track were difficult to build as they ascended Robeson Mountain to the quarries through the series of switchbacks and tight turns, that kept the grade of the track below a maximum of 7%. The average grade of the last two miles was 5%. The end of the line, at the Fletcher quarry, rose 1,740 feet (530 m), about 1,000 feet (300 m) above the railroad’s origin in Hardwick.

Construction of the main line was completed to the Woodbury quarry around October 1, 1897. The total cost of construction was reported to be $50,691.69 (equivalent to $1,961,768 in 2025). There were 16 miles (26 km) of track in total (counting the leased span), only 9 of which could be called main line. Originally, there was no way to turn around a locomotive on the entire line: a crew would need to travel over the St.J.&L.C. track to Morrisville to use the turntable there. A wye was built at Foster’s Summit, and later another wye was installed near the H&W engine house in Hardwick. The main line passed thirteen listed "stations" functioning as waypoints for calculating shipping costs but not a single company-owned building on the entire route. (Note: These "stations" were tariff points, for calculating shipping charges. By 1910, there were 32 of them, and by 1922, there were 40: 28 within the yard limits and 12 more between the yard and the Fletcher quarry.) Despite the railroad’s name, the track did not extend to Woodbury village.

The directors of the railroad promised equal treatment of all local granite companies and free construction of siding tracks during 1897. Soon, branches extended to the "Blue" and "White" quarries of the Woodbury Granite Company and the Fletcher quarry. Woodbury’s "Gray" quarry atop Robeson Mountain was the end of the main line. The larger quarries were served by multiple sidings; the Gray quarry had at least six, but these were removed and rebuilt as convenient to serve the quarrying areas. At the other end of the line, in Hardwick, sidings extended to the granite sheds; no less than seven sidings served the Woodbury Granite Co.’s facilities. The railroad’s "yard" comprised all of the track—main line and sidings—between Buffalo Crossing and Granite Junction. The yard was sometimes called Woodbury Station.

The finished railroad had 43 curves with a maximum curve of 21 degrees. Stub switches were used throughout. The two main-line switchbacks were dubbed the Thomas and Fletcher switchbacks. There were nine unprotected grade crossings of roads. Although the State Railroad Commissioners were critical of the condition of the railroad, particularly its safety features, in their 1899 inspection report, it was allowed to operate because it was designed and intended to be a low-speed freight handler. Despite official concerns, there were no train collisions on the railroad, and its injury and fatality record was better than the Vermont statewide average. However, the railroad’s use of link-and-pin couplers meant that the brakemen had the most dangerous work on the railroad, and several were killed or injured. The first operational fatality was in 1901 (another had occurred during construction). In July 1904, three flatcars, loaded with grout, ran down the mountain, crashing into the engine house and wrecking Locomotive No. 2, a flatcar, and the engine house; this appeared to be the work of vandals who released the cars’ brakes. Derailments were a frequent occurrence on quarry, mine, and timber railroads because of the light rails, sharp curves, and scanty ballasting often used in their construction; the H&W saw multiple derailments. Rerailer frogs, essentially ramps to get a derailed car’s wheels back on the track, were always carried on trains.

With the completion of the railroad, the quarries developed rapidly. Additional granite-finishing facilities were built around the Hardwick end of the railroad and the local granite industry became concentrated there. Hardwick became an important granite center and its population mushroomed; town boosters proclaimed it to be the "building granite capital of the world."

== Operations ==
As might be expected of a railroad built for an industrial purpose, the H&W’s business was dominated by freight. Passenger revenue was less than 1% of freight revenue. In 1899, the railroad carried only 712 paying passengers; by 1906, this was down to 448, accounting for just $111 in revenue. Freight, in turn, was dominated by granite: in 1898–99, granite accounted for 99.37% of the total freight transported. Small amounts of lumber, merchandise, household goods, coal, and "miscellaneous items" accounted for the rest of the freight. The freight tariff for ca. 1896-1899 was about 6 cents per ton-mile, so shipping cost only about 4% of the value of the stone: the quarry owners’ bet was a good one.

A 60,000-pound (27,000 kg) block of granite aboard a flat car.

Built quickly and cheaply, and for heavy freight, the railroad was more expensive to run than many of its contemporaries, as the heavy cargo tended to overpower the light construction. Frequent maintenance and repair work were needed; repairs and tie replacement accounted for about one-third of the railroad’s expenses. Sagging or loose rails were a constant problem, and the track needed to be reballasted every year from 1903. Locomotives were repaired by an engineer in the engine house in Hardwick, while car repairs were performed at the car repair shop at Buffalo Crossing.

Although the original directors of the railroad were largely aligned with the Fletcher quarrying interests, the later purchase of stock by the new owners of the Woodbury Granite Co. allowed them to take control of the company. The board of directors was controlled by directors affiliated with the Woodbury company in 1902, with only two directors representing other quarrying interests. By 1908, those two had left the board and the company was firmly in the control of the WGC. The railroad’s growth was largely driven by the success and growth of the WGC, particularly once that company won the contract for the granite for the Pennsylvania State Capitol in 1903. The 30-foot columns specified in the contract could not have been transported practically without a railroad.

The railroad's first snowplow was a primitive contraption.

The railroad company’s charter allowed it to suspend service in the winter, and the front page of the local freight tariff always included a notice that carriage was "subject to the right to suspend operations upon statutory notice" from December through March. However, the railroad did not close for the winter throughout its operation although there were some shorter closures late in its existence. As a result, snow was an issue for the railroad. The railroad's first snowplow was built by the railroad’s first engineer; it had to be removed and attached to the other end of the locomotive at each switchback. Around 1900, this plow was replaced with a plow obtained from a timber railroad. This proved unsatisfactory, and a second-hand plow was bought from the St. Johnsbury & Lake Champlain when that railroad obtained a new one. This third plow served the H&W for the rest of its existence. For lighter snowfalls, the railroad had a "flanger", designed by a conductor and built in Lyndonville. It was built on a single long truck and was quite effective.

The railroad's custom-built flanger was used to clear the track after light snowfalls.

The railroad’s busiest years were 1906 through 1916, and its revenue peaked (at approximately $65,000) in 1913. At the height of its operations, it had about 30 employees, including two train crews, one based at each end of the line. As might be expected from a small workforce, the employees performed many duties that did not align with their positions on the payroll. In 1916, the railroad was reported to have 3 steam locomotives, 54 freight cars, and one caboose. Limited by the switchbacks, train length averaged ten to fifteen cars in the busy years; the largest train was reported to have been 22 cars long. The largest single load carried was a 61-ton stone from the "White" quarry of the WGC. The railroad’s earnings varied widely with the demand for granite, but on at least one occasion the profits were sufficient to justify paying a 6% dividend on common stock and 12% on preferred.

Railroad operations were of three varieties: main line hauling, quarry switching, and yard switching. Main line hauling involved running trains up and down the mountain, bringing supplies up, and stone down. Quarry switching was moving loaded and empty cars among the sidings at the quarries, and composing them into trains. Yard switching involved moving cars to, from, and within the yard, and especially the finishing sheds, assembling trains, and exchanging cars with the St.J.&L.C. at Granite Junction. The company had two train crews, a main line crew and a yard crew. The main line crew performed the quarry switching as well as the runs up and down the mountain, and consisted of a conductor, engineer, fireman, and two brakemen (one at each end of the train). This crew typically made two round trips a day between the quarries and Hardwick.

The locomotive was always placed at the downhill end of the train, where its braking power could be used to slow the whole train. Flat cars had manual brakes, which would be set and released by the brakemen on orders from the engineer. The Shay locomotives used considerable amounts of water, which could be replenished at three points along the route: the stream by Buffalo Crossing, a low spot between Burnham Hill and Foster Summit, and a tank at the quarries.

The yard area around Buffalo Crossing had such facilities as a coal pit, a car repair shop, a sawmill and electric power plant. A coal trestle served both the power plant and the locomotives, which remained below the trestle on a loading siding, allowing their tenders to be loaded with coal from the coal cars above using gravity. Locomotives were repaired in the engine house in the West End. Other facilities included a track scale, which allowed car weights—and thus shipping charges—to be calculated.

== Decline ==
The business arc of the Hardwick & Woodbury was typical of most short line, single-industry railroads. The H&W was built to transport rough granite, and never had another industry of significance along its tracks. (Note: The U.S. Geologic Survey’s 1909 map shows about a dozen quarries along the railroad’s route.) As a result, the railroad’s fortunes were inextricably tied to those of the local granite industry, particularly its dominant operator, the Woodbury Granite Company. It is possible, notes Wood, that the decline of both companies began with the sudden death of George H. Bickford, treasurer of the railroad and secretary-treasurer (later general manager) of the granite company, in 1914. During World War I, granite was a low priority, and new granite-working equipment was difficult or impossible to obtain, leaving companies to make do with old equipment. A shift to concrete and steel-frame construction (which used granite only for façades) after the war led to a decline in the market for architectural granite. As demand for the sole product slumped, so did the fortunes of the railroad. Improved roads allowed for transportation by truck, and the smaller pieces of granite that were increasingly becoming the industry norm did not require railroads to move them. The railroad suffered years of diminishing traffic and cutbacks. By 1923, the railroad ran one train per day in each direction, six days a week. The number of trains declined to one per week, and the workforce was cut until only three employees were left.

As the railroad slumped, the St. Johnsbury & Lake Champlain Railroad assumed responsibility for operations and the remaining employees in 1925. The company was re-organized in 1926, with W.C. Clifford as its president. By the next year, many repairs of equipment and track had taken place, and plans were made to replace some of the old cars. In addition, the railroad made quarry owners responsible for the cost of maintenance of their sidings. Also in 1927, the WGC was reorganized with the same president. However, the Great Flood of 1927 caused extensive track damage that November, disrupting traffic for more than a month. Service was restored with a loan from the state to the parent railroad. The years 1930–31 saw 11 local quarries go out of business. Operation of the railroad by the St.J.&L.C. continued until abandonment of the line south of Buffalo Crossing was approved by the Interstate Commerce Commission in October 1934. The abandonment was immediate, being completed on October 17. The Woodbury Granite Company ceased operations the next year and sold its assets.

When the H&W stopped operating it owed the St.J.&L.C. a substantial debt. The St.J.&L.C. resumed control of the spur that had been leased to the H&W, which remained in service as long as there was a need to ship granite by rail. The rails south of Buffalo Crossing were removed in August 1940 No buyers could be found for the remaining locomotives, so they were scrapped, along with some 40 flat cars, the rails, and some other equipment. Just one flat car was taken by the St.J.&L.C. The proceeds from the scrapping were used to repay the St.J.&L.C. Company records were mostly discarded.

The last remaining portion of track, the spur built by the St. Johnsbury & Lake Champlain (and then known as the Hardwick and Woodbury Connecting Track), was formally abandoned in 2004 by the Lamoille Valley Railroad Company, successor to the St.J.&L.C., although it had not been used for some years. The spur was railbanked, but is not included in the Lamoille Valley Rail Trail.

== Rolling stock ==
=== Locomotives ===
Locomotive No. 1, the "E.H. Blossom".

The railroad’s first locomotive was the 4-4-0 Hinkley rod locomotive it leased from the Boston & Maine. When this engine outlived its usefulness (largely because it could not ascend the steeper grades beyond Burnam Hill), the company bought a Shay locomotive (whose gear drive enabled it to handle steeper track) from the Barre & Chelsea. This was given the number 1 and named E.H. Blossom for the railroad’s general manager. It had two trucks and eight 32.5-inch (83 cm) drive wheels, and weighed 40 tons. This locomotive was used for the rest of the construction of the line, and then was the railroad's only service locomotive for several years.

Locomotive No. 2, the "John S. Holden".

Locomotive No. 2, also a Shay, was purchased in February 1901; it was completed 1902 and named John S. Holden for the president of the railroad. A larger and heavier machine than its predecessor, it enabled the railroad to run longer trains from the quarries to the finishing sheds. It had three trucks with twelve 32-inch (81 cm) drive wheels and weighed 46 tons. A third locomotive was purchased in 1906 and delivered in January 1909 It was first named Charles W. Leonard (vice-president of the railroad), then George H. Bickford (the railroad’s treasurer and son-in-law of John Holden), and finally Charles A. Hubbard (an engineer). Larger than either of the others, with three trucks and twelve 36-inch (91 cm) drive wheels, engine No. 3 weighed 52 tons. Although the railroad owned three locomotives from 1909 to 1917, it employed only two engineers and two firemen, so it is likely that Engine No. 1 was kept as a spare during that timespan. A photograph of Locomotive No. 3 hauling a train loaded with stone was printed on contemporary postcards.

=== Cars and cabooses ===
The railroad bought 38 flatcars in 1904, after the Woodbury Granite Company secured its first large contract, for the Pennsylvania State Capitol. By 1909, the line had rolling stock of about 50 cars, including flatcars, hopper cars, dump cars, a well car, a snowplow, a flanger, and three flat cars equipped with passenger benches. It borrowed two passenger coaches for special outings. In 1914, it was reported to have 57 flatcars alone. The 24-foot (7.3 m) long flatcars could carry 40,000 pounds (18,000 kg), while the 36-foot (11 m) cars had a 60,000 pounds (27,000 kg) capacity. These cars, largely purchased from other railroads, weighed 10 to 15 tons each and had mechanical brakes, limiting their use to the H&W, as the federal Railroad Safety Appliance Act, which required such equipment as air brakes and automatic couplers after 1900, applied only to interstate commerce. Larger flatcars (up to 80,000 pounds) and the well car, with air brakes and automatic couplers, could be used for interstate traffic and on other Vermont railroads. Hopper or gondola cars were used to transport such small-sized materials as crushed stone, paving block, and coal. Side-dumping grout cars were used to fill ravines and for dumping grout into piles; the dump mechanisms were operated with compressed air, eliminating the need for one crewman.

Caboose No. 1, the "bobber".

The well car designed by Edward Blossom, carrying a large crated slab of granite.

The railroad’s first caboose was known as a "bobber", as its two axles caused it to bob and sway on the uneven track. Other, larger cabooses followed. The train crew (conductor, brakemen, and possibly the locomotive crew when not on duty) had quarters in the caboose. Although some records indicate that the railroad owned two passenger coaches, these are believed to be inaccurate, as too few passengers were carried to justify owning multiple passenger cars, although coaches were rented or borrowed from the St.J.&L.C. for special excursions. At other times, passenger benches were fitted on flatcars for fair-weather excursions. Passengers were likely carried in the cabooses on most occasions.

The general manager of the Hardwick & Woodbury, Edward H. Blossom, designed a special car for shipping large granite blocks. As reported by the Railroad Gazette in 1899, this car was built by the Laconia Car Company of New Hampshire to carry slabs of stone up to 13 by 17 feet (4.0 m × 5.2 m), 18 inches (460 mm) thick, weighing 20 tons. The car had a 36-foot (11 m) platform and a 20 by 4 feet (6.1 m × 1.2 m) "cradle" or "well" in the center. On each long side of this opening ran three long timbers, one above the next, parallel to the long edge of the car. Each stack of timbers was held together—and to the platform of the car—by six vertical rods, which descended to eight inches (20 cm) above the heads of the rails. Each pair of these rods supported an oak bar, 4 by 6 inches (10 by 15 centimetres), running the width of the car (approximately 8 feet or 2.5 m). These six oak pieces were trussed together to form the floor of the well, which supported the granite slab on its edge, its upper part braced on each side by seven timbers (see photo), whose lower ends were fastened to the floor. On March 26, 1901, Blossom was granted U.S. patent No. 670,529 for this car, specifically its well bottom and adjustable support rods. The first finished stone shipped on this car was for a mausoleum in Chicago, and it seems likely that the car was designed with that sort of shipments in mind. This design was widely copied.

== Legacy ==
Much of the railroad's right of way is now a trail through second-growth woodland.

A somewhat artistic rendering of the postcard photograph of H&W Locomotive No. 3 pulling the "quarry train" appears on this stock certificate.

The abandonment and removal of the railroad's track left a trail through the hillside pastures, which have reverted to woods. A portion of the roadbed leading to the quarries is now Fletcher Quarry Road and Quarry Road in Woodbury, serving the one Robeson Mountain quarry still in operation. Decades after the abandonment, some of the right-of-way, from near Buffalo Crossing to the Woodbury Town Forest, found a new use as the Hardwick-Woodbury Rail Trail (also known as the Hardwick-Woodbury Recreation Trail).

The postcard photograph of Locomotive No. 3 pulling a trainload of granite blocks saw continued life in other forms. The picture became something of a "stock photo" in the 1920s and was reproduced—typically without attribution—far from Vermont. This included such circumstances as stock certificates of, for example, the Virginia Alberene Corporation (see photo), which used a short-line industrial railroad to move blocks of soapstone.

A railroad modeler based a quarry railroad layout on the Hardwick & Woodbury. He particularly noted the railroad's use of "three Shays for motive power." The E.H. Blossom well-deck car has also been modeled.

The small size of the railroad led to a number of jokes about it. As early as 1902, W.H. Fullerton, a director of the H&W, contacted a counterpart at the New York Central Railroad to propose that they exchange free-travel passes on one another’s railroads. Facing a rebuttal, he allowed that the Hardwick & Woodbury might not be as long as the mighty New York Central but, he maintained, it was "just as wide." The story was re-told in the Woodbury and Hardwick area for decades.
