= Teddy Carroll =

Edward "Teddy" Carroll
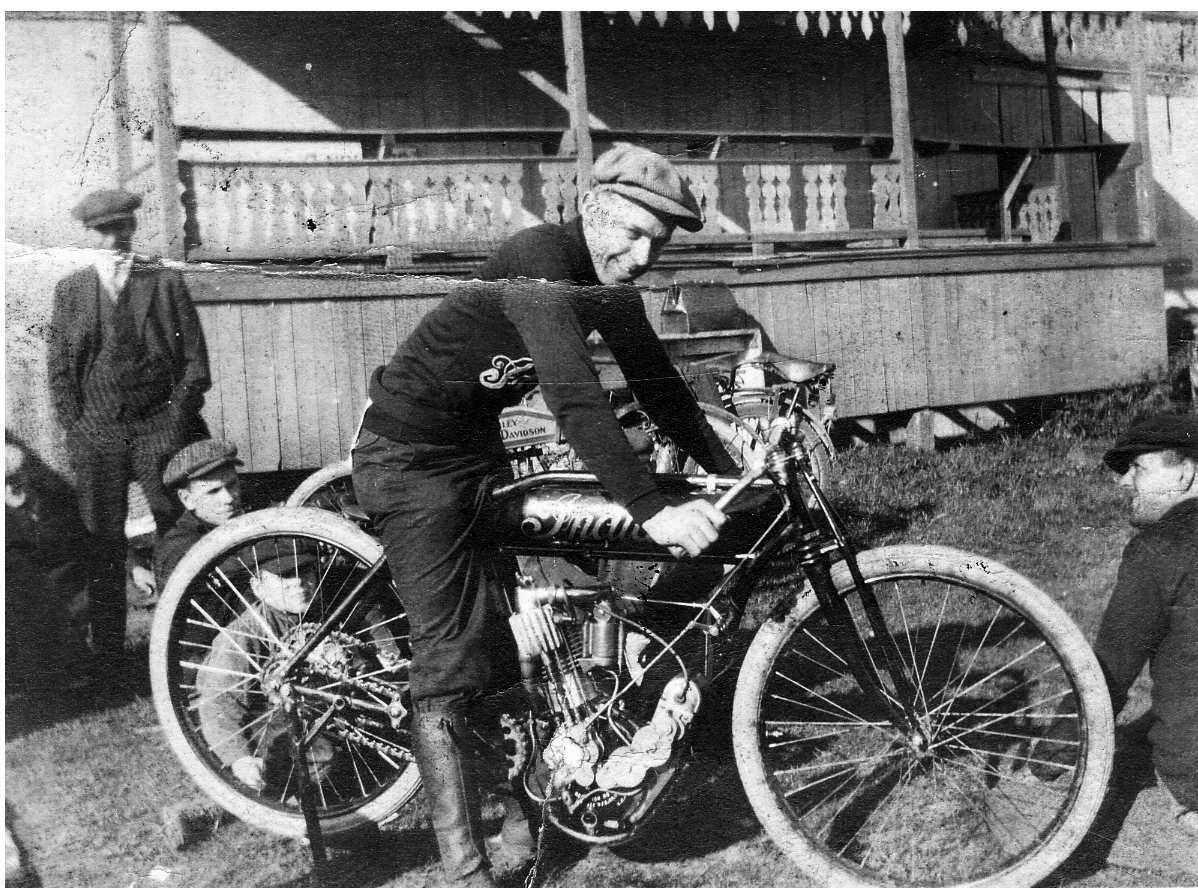

Edward Carroll (born 1894) was an American motorbike racer. He was one of the original factory test riders for the Indian Motocycle company and a member of the first generation of men who raced motorized bicycles. Born in Springfield, Massachusetts, Carroll was practically raised in the backyard of the giant Hendee Mfg. Co. factory. At twelve, Carroll rode his first "gasoline-fired" two-wheeler and mastered the "run, push, and jump-on style" necessary to get the clutchless cycles underway.

By age 15 Carroll was driving an Indian Tricar van making deliveries for a laundry and then later for a department store. In 1912 he bought his first machine, a 7 horse-power Indian Twin and entered a series of Board Track races at the local Springfield Stadium (pictured below) built in 1909. Board Track racing was extremely dangerous, as the riders wore virtually no protective clothing, the machines had no brakes or suspension, and they depended on skinny skid-prone tires while race speeds crept ever closer to 100 mph. In the event of a crash the best a rider could hope for was a body full of long and infection-prone splinters. Plenty of riders came off far worse for their adventures. During the next few years the enthusiastic teenager raced at county fairs in various parts of New England earning for himself a collection of trophies and some small cash prizes.

Then in 1914 Carroll realized his dream by landing a job in the testing room at the Indian (Hendee) factory. The following year the Springfield manufacturer furnished Carroll with an 8-valve machine with which he won his first professional competition, setting a new track record at the nearby one-mile dirt Readville Race Track. In the race, the Indian rider beat several notable members of the Harley-Davidson "wrecking crew" including Al Stratton and Irving Janke. In September, Carroll ran 2nd behind Carl Goudy in the famous 300-mile Chicago board track event, and in a follow-up 100-mile race in Milwaukee the Springfield rider again placed 2nd, this time behind H-D's, Leslie "Red" Parkhurst.

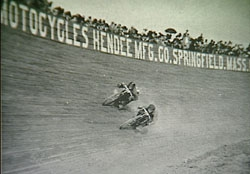
Board track racing at Springfield Stadium 1911

Always a contender, and sometimes a champion, Carroll was proud to wear the red and white colors of the Indian factory team. And although the sport of motorcycle racing continued on, Board Track racing fell out of favor due to the carnage of both rider and spectator, and by the early 1930s it had become a footnote in motorsport history.
