= Reynold Weidenaar =

- Known for: mezzotint prints
- Movement: American Regionalist art

Reynold Henry Weidenaar (1915-1985) was an artist from Grand Rapids, Michigan, recognized nationally as well as locally for his technical virtuosity as a draftsman and printmaker. He embraced the subject matter and realism of American Regionalist art, though his depictions of the American Scene reflect a uniquely personal, often satirical perspective. Weidenaar is especially known for his mezzotint prints, particularly those of architectural subjects, such as the construction of the Mackinac Bridge.

== Biography ==
November 17, 1915 - Reynold Henry Weidenaar was born to Dirk Weidenaar and Effie Kuiper Weidenaar in Grand Rapids, Michigan.

1927 - He and his mother Effie and sister Jeanne begin to spell their last name Weidener (see Grand Rapids City Directory 1927).

1930s - Attends Christian High School and Ottawa Hills High School in Grand Rapids.

1935-1936 - Attends David Wolcott Kendall School of Art (now Kendall College of Art and Design), for a one-year period, plus four terms of evening classes.

June 1938 – Wins first prize in painting for Kansas City Art Institute National High School Competition.

June 1938 – Graduates from George A. Davis Vocational and Technical High School, Grand Rapids.

September 1938– May 1940 - Studies at Kansas City Art Institute, Kansas City, Missouri. His instructors include Thomas Hart Benton and John de Martelly.

May 1940 – Spends one week in Chicago receiving instruction in etching and printing techniques from Bertha Jaques and James Swann.

March 1941 – His etchings Evening Storm and Marketplace II are acquired by the Library of Congress, chosen from the Society of American Etchers Exhibition in New York.

October 1941 – Solo exhibition of etchings at the Grand Rapids Art Gallery.

March 2–31, 1941 – Solo exhibition at the Smithsonian Institution United States National Museum, Division of Graphic Arts.

May 1943 – Changes spelling of his name back to Weidenaar.

April 1944– Awarded John Simon Guggenheim Memorial Foundation Fellowship Award.

June 1944 - Marries Ilse Eerdmans.

November 1944 – Travels in Mexico with his wife, on Guggenheim Fellowship, three-month period.

September 1948 – His article on the mezzotint technique is published in American Artist.

October 1948 – Awarded Louis Comfort Tiffany Foundation Scholarship.

April 1949 – Elected Associate member (designated as A.N.A.) of National Academy of Design, New York.

1954 - Begins painting watercolors.

1956 - Joins faculty at Kendall School of Design (continuing through 1975).

Fall 1959 – Travels to Italy. Begins fresco work at LaGrave Christian Reformed Church, Grand Rapids, continues through 1965.

March 1965 - Elected full Academician, National Academy of Design, New York.

1966 - Divorced.

January 1966 - One man show of watercolors at the Grand Rapids Art Gallery.

1970 - Authors and illustrates book on West Michigan, Our Changing Landscape.

1980 - Co-authors and illustrates A Sketchbook of Michigan, with Anne Zeller.

1981 - Solo exhibition at Martin Sumers Graphics, New York.

November 1983 – Retrospective exhibition at the Grand Rapids Art Museum, “Reynold Weidenaar: Dutch Master of Grand Rapids.”

November 1983 - Retrospective exhibition at Hefner’s Art Gallery, Grand Rapids.

1985 - Dies of cardiac arrest at age 69.

== Archival Collections ==
Grand Rapids Art Museum Institutional Scrapbooks, Grand Rapids Art Museum, Grand Rapids, Michigan.

Reynold H. Weidenaar Papers, collection 482, Calvin College, Hekman Library, Heritage Hall Special Collections, Grand Rapids, Michigan.

Reynold H. Weidenaar Papers, Weidenaar Portfolio, Inc., Grand Rapids, Michigan.

Reynold Weidenaar Archival Collection no. 75 and Reynold Weidenaar Personal Archival Collection no. 81, Grand Rapids Public Museum, Grand Rapids, Michigan.
