= Woodbury, Vermont =

- Town
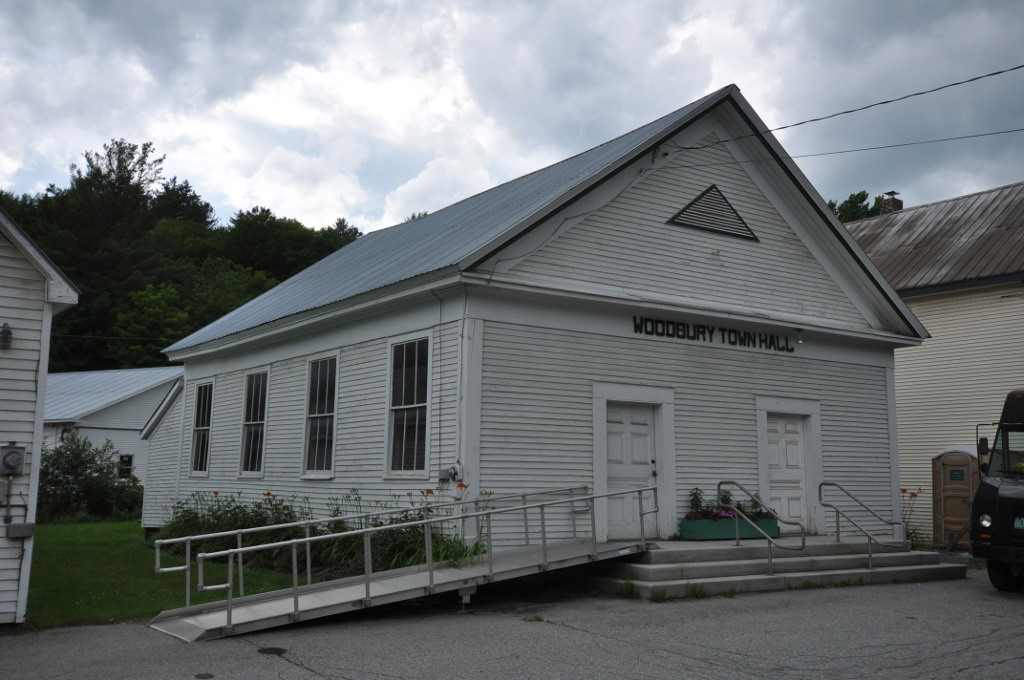
- Woodbury Town Hall

- Location in Washington County and the state of Vermont
- Coordinates: 44°28′40″N 72°23′45″W
- Country: United States
- State: Vermont
- County: Washington
- Communities: Woodbury; South Woodbury

Area
  - Total: 39.1 sq mi (101.3 km^{2})
  - Land: 37.5 sq mi (97.1 km^{2})
  - Water: 1.6 sq mi (4.1 km^{2})
- Elevation: 1,348 ft (411 m)

Population (2020)
  - Total: 928
  - Density: 24.8/sq mi (9.56/km^{2})
- Time zone: UTC-5 (Eastern (EST))
  - Summer (DST): UTC-4 (EDT)
- ZIP Codes: 05681 (Woodbury); 05650 (East Calais); 05658 (Marshfield)
- Area code: 802
- FIPS code: 50-85525
- GNIS feature ID: 1462270
- Website: woodburyvt.org

Woodbury is a town in Washington County, Vermont, United States. The population was 928 at the 2020 census.

== History ==
Woodbury was chartered and settled in the late 18th century. After the U.S. Civil War, granite quarrying became a viable business, and the Hardwick and Woodbury Railroad was built to transport stone from the quarries to finishing shops in nearby Hardwick, which had a rail connection to the outside world. Woodbury's granite finishing business faded away, although granite is still quarried in the town and "Woodbury Gray" granite is still sold.

== Geography ==
According to the United States Census Bureau, the town has a total area of 39.1 square miles (101.3 km^{2}), of which 37.5 square miles (97.1 km^{2}) is land and 1.6 square miles (4.1 km^{2}), or 4.06%, is water.

== Demographics ==
Historical population
Census	Pop.	Note	%±
1800	23		—
1810	254		1,004.3%
1820	432		70.1%
1830	824		90.7%
1840	1,092		32.5%
1850	1,070		−2.0%
1860	999		−6.6%
1870	902		−9.7%
1880	856		−5.1%
1890	810		−5.4%
1900	862		6.4%
1910	824		−4.4%
1920	686		−16.7%
1930	529		−22.9%
1940	463		−12.5%
1950	449		−3.0%
1960	317		−29.4%
1970	399		25.9%
1980	573		43.6%
1990	766		33.7%
2000	809		5.6%
2010	906		12.0%
2020	928		2.4%
U.S. Decennial Census

As of the census of 2000, there were 809 people, 329 households, and 209 families residing in the town. The population density was 21.4 people per square mile (8.3/km^{2}). There were 659 housing units at an average density of 17.4 per square mile (6.7/km^{2}). The racial makeup of the town was 91.59% White, 0.37% African American, 0.62% Native American, 0.49% Asian, 0.37% Pacific Islander, 0.62% from other races, and 5.93% from two or more races. Hispanic or Latino of any race were 1.11% of the population.

There were 329 households, out of which 30.1% had children under the age of 18 living with them, 52.6% were couples living together and joined in either marriage or civil union, 6.4% had a female householder with no husband present, and 36.2% were non-families. 24.9% of all households were made up of individuals, and 7.9% had someone living alone who was 65 years of age or older. The average household size was 2.46 and the average family size was 3.00.

In the town, the population was spread out, with 23.6% under the age of 18, 7.5% from 18 to 24, 30.2% from 25 to 44, 31.6% from 45 to 64, and 7.0% who were 65 years of age or older. The median age was 40 years. For every 100 females, there were 111.2 males. For every 100 females age 18 and over, there were 106.0 males.

The median income for a household in the town was $35,357, and the median income for a family was $42,727. Males had a median income of $27,434 versus $25,417 for females. The per capita income for the town was $19,772. About 5.1% of families and 8.3% of the population were below the poverty line, including 8.8% of those under age 18 and 13.6% of those age 65 or over.

== Notable people ==
- Seymour Ainsworth, businessman and member of the New York State Assembly, born in Woodbury
- Charles H. Heath, President pro tempore of the Vermont Senate
- Charles Webster Leonard, businessman who was an executive with the Woodbury Granite Company
- Bob Smith, Major League Baseball pitcher, born in Woodbury
