= Daniel Morris Monroe =

American artist (born 1964)

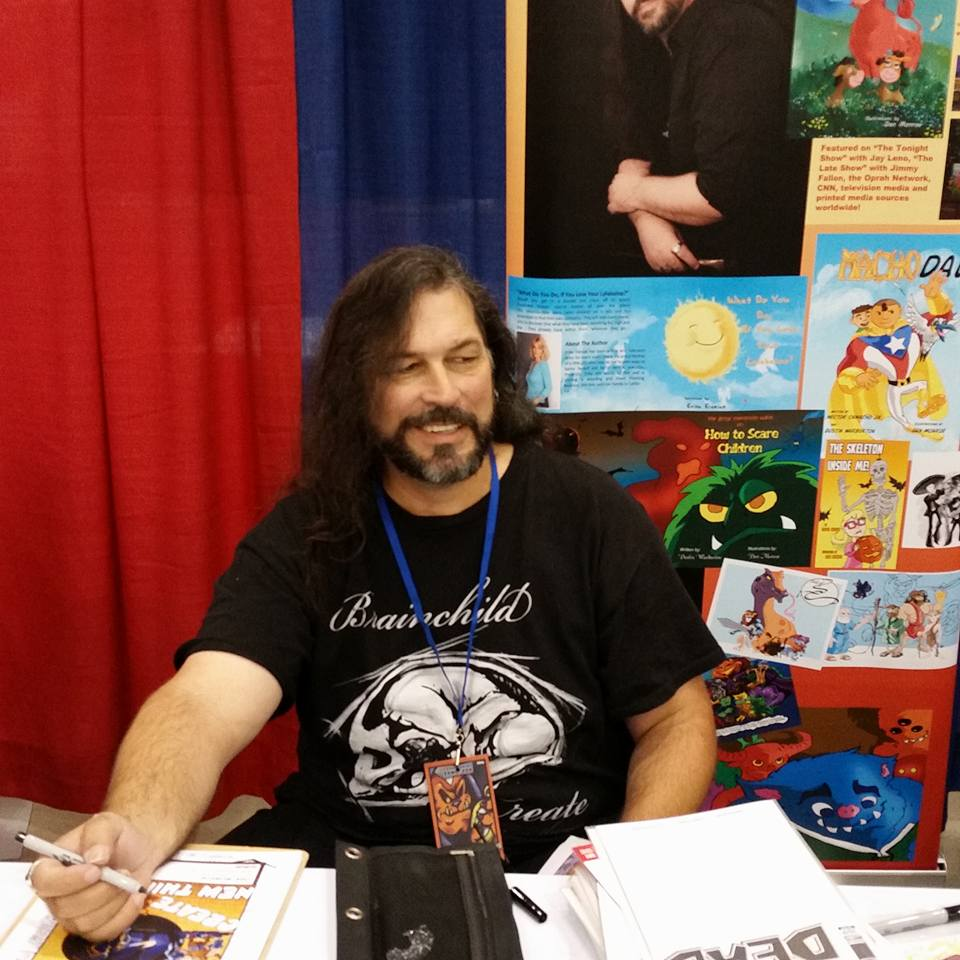
- At his table at the Grand Rapids ComicCon (2016)
- Born: Todd Michael Gehring; July 12, 1964 (age 61); Jackson, Michigan, United States
- Other names: Dragonbrush
- Spouse: Lori Monroe
- Children: 2 boys, 1 girl

Daniel Morris Monroe (born July 12, 1964) is an American artist and illustrator.

In 2012, he illustrated Dennis the Wild Bull, a children's book written by NBA Hall of Famer Dennis Rodman. Since the creation of this book, Dan has gone on to illustrate books by former Baywatch actress Erika Eleniak, notable boxers such as Kostya Tszyu, Jesse James Leija, Deontay Wilder and the son of the late boxing legend Hector Camacho. Dan has also created trading cards for these boxers and actress Sybil Danning.

== Early life ==
Monroe was born July 12, 1964, in Jackson, Michigan, as Todd Michael Gehring. His mother was a ward of the State of Michigan and he was put up for adoption. He was adopted at six months of age by the Monroe family, who were Pentecostal evangelists.

Monroe developed drawing skills at a young age, drawing portraits of people on dinner napkins with a ball point pen. He served in the United States Army and learned airbrush techniques at a corner T-shirt shop while stationed in Honolulu, Hawaii.He attended Kendall College of Art and Design in Grand Rapids, Michigan, and later became an instructor at Western Michigan University.

Monroe resides in Michigan with his second wife, Lori and has four children, three boys and a girl, Jason, Mason, Brandon and Ashley.

== Works ==
- Bullies Aren't Scary is a book written by International Boxing Hall of Fame inductee Kostya Tszyu and author Dustin Warburton. The book has an anti-bullying theme. It debuted at the Supanova Pop Culture Event in Melbourne, Australia, in April 2013.
- Jesse and the Boogeyman is a children's book written by boxing champion Jesse James Leija, co-written by Dustin Warburton. This book tells the story of the Cucuy (the Mexican version of the American boogeyman) and the night a young Jesse was whisked off to a different place to learn a lesson. This book made its debut in spring 2013.
- Monroe has recently worked on the illustrations for a children's book written by Baywatch actress Erika Eleniak, as well as working a project for the US Department of Defense.
- Deontay the Future World Champ! is a children's book inspired by life events of heavyweight world boxing champion Deontay Wilder
