= Ted Bell =

American writer (1946–2023)

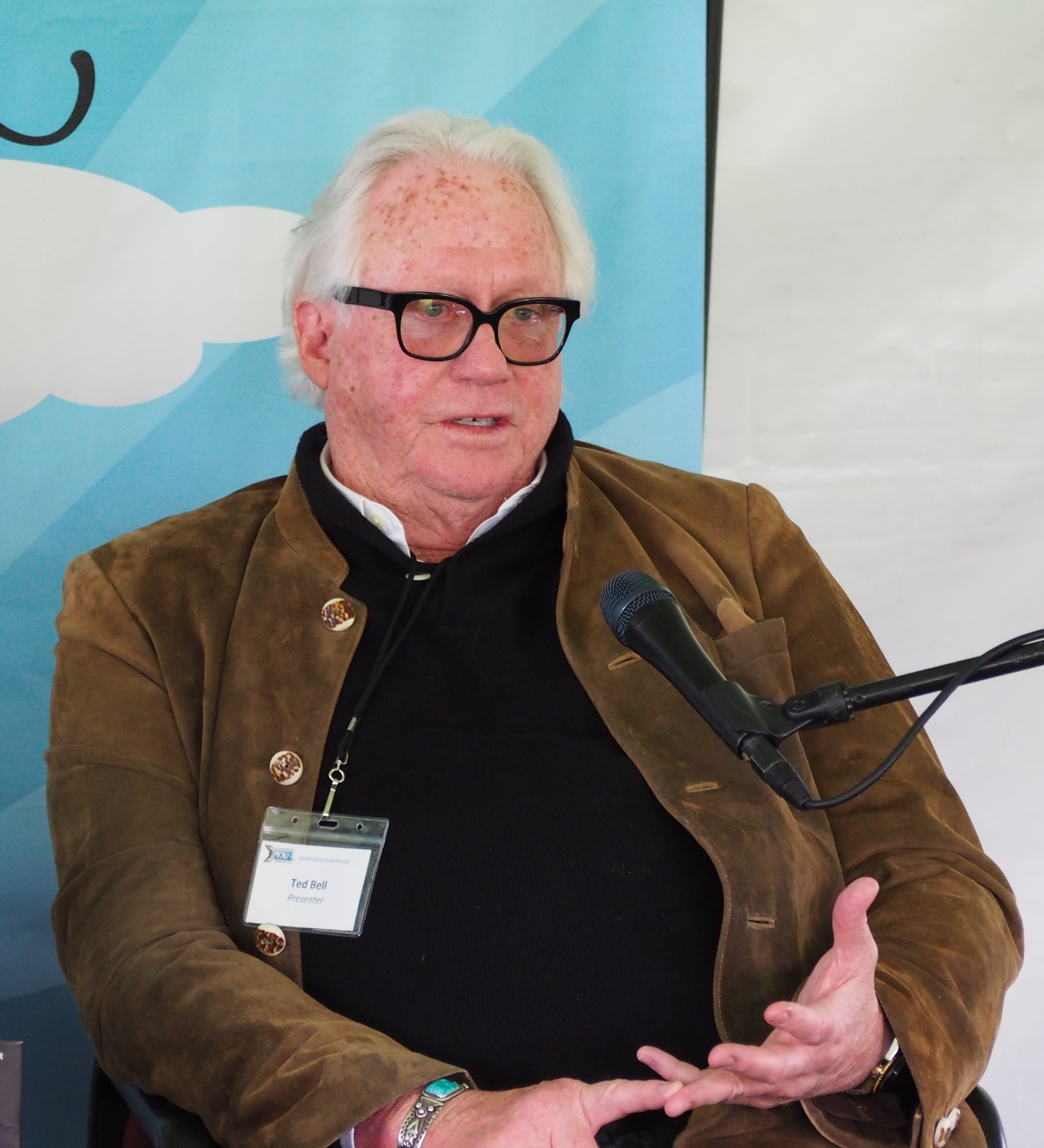
- Bell in 2018
- Born: Theodore Augustus Bell III; July 3, 1946; Tampa, Florida, U.S.
- Died: January 20, 2023 (aged 76); Hartford, Connecticut, U.S.
- Education: Randolph–Macon College (BA)
- Occupations: Author, advertising executive
- Writing career
- Language: English
- Years active: 2001–2023
- Genre: Suspense
- Notable work: Alex Hawke spy series
- Notable awards: Honorary DFA, Kendall College of Art and Design

Theodore Augustus Bell III (July 3, 1946 – January 20, 2023) was an American author of 12 suspense novels, including Hawke, Assassin, Pirate, Spy, Warlord, Phantom, and Overkill. He is best known for his New York Times Bestselling series of spy thriller novels (mentioned above) featuring the character Lord Alexander Hawke.

Before becoming a novelist, Bell was president and chief creative officer of the Leo Burnett Company in Chicago. He was later named vice chairman of the board and worldwide creative director of Young & Rubicam, one of the world's largest advertising agencies. At age 25, he sold his first Hollywood screenplay, Screamathon, to producers Joel B. Michaels and Garth Drabinsky.

== Biography ==
Bell was a graduate of Randolph–Macon College in Ashland, Virginia, with a B.A. in English. He was a member of Kappa Alpha Order fraternity. He was a former member of the college's board of trustees. He was given an honorary degree in fine arts from Kendall College of Art and Design in Grand Rapids, Michigan.

In 2011-2012, Bell was elected a visiting scholar at Cambridge University (UK) completing his studies at Cambridge's Department of Political Science and International Studies (POLIS). He was also elected to the position of writer-in-residence at Sidney Sussex College, Cambridge (UK).

DOCA, a Department of Defense committee, selected Bell as a civilian member of the standing group that supports the US military. He also served for a brief time as an advisor to the Undersecretary for Public Diplomacy at the U.S. State Department. He served on the advisory board of General George Washington's Mount Vernon (in Fairfax County, Virginia) under former Secretary of the Army, Togo D. West Jr. Bell's former wife is Greenwich, Connecticut-based Evelyn Byrd Lorentzen (known as Evelyn Lorentzen Bell), a relative of the founder of Richmond, Virginia, William Byrd II. Their daughter, Evelyn (Byrdie) Byrd Bell, is a model and actress.

Bell wrote the Alexander Hawke series of spy novels. Warlord, released in 2010, revolves around a vendetta against the British royal family beginning with the 1979 murder of Lord Mountbatten. His previous work, Tsar (2008), deals with the rise of the 'New Russia', the return of the KGB, and the new 'Evil Empire.' Overkill, his Hawke novel released in 2018, deals with Vladimir Putin and the kidnapping of Hawke's son, Alexei.

Bell's World War II time-travel adventure novel, Nick of Time, was published in a new hardcover illustrated edition by St. Martin's Press in May 2008. It features Nick McIver, along with Lord Richard Hawke, Archibald "Gunner" Steele, Kate McIver (Nick's younger sister), Commander Hobbes (Lord Hawke's colleague, a brilliant weapons designer), the murderous pirate captain Billy Blood, and his cohort Snake Eye. It debuted on The New York Times Best Seller list for Children at #4.

The sequel to Nick of Time was published in hardcover by St. Martin's Press in 2010. Titled The Time Pirate, it deals with the Nazi invasion of the Channel Islands and Nick McIver's role in George Washington's victory over Cornwallis at the Battle of Yorktown in 1781. It debuted on The New York Times Best Seller list for Children at #6.

In January 2019, Bell and Jonathan Adler of Adler Films formed El Dorado Entertainment, a feature film and television production company based in New York.

In July 2019, Bell signed a two-book deal with Random House.

Bell lived and worked in Greenwich, Connecticut. He died in Hartford of an intracerebral hemorrhage on January 20, 2023, at the age of 76.

== Bibliography ==
=== Alex Hawke series ===
==== Novels ====
1. Hawke (2003)
2. Assassin (2004)
3. Pirate (2005)
4. Spy (2006)
5. Tsar (2008)
6. Warlord (2010)
7. Phantom (2012)
8. Warriors (2014)
9. Patriot (2015)
10. Overkill (2018)
11. Dragonfire (2020)
12. Sea Hawke (2021)

A 13th book in the Alex Hawke series, Monarch, written by Ryan Steck, was published in 2025.

==== Short stories ====
- "The Powder Monkey" (2006)
- "Crash Dive" (2011)
- "What Comes Around" (working title was "Rogue") (2014)

=== Nick McIver time travel adventures ===
(Ages 10 & up)

- Nick of Time (2008)
- The Time Pirate (2010)

=== Blackford Blaine short stories ===
- "The Pirate of Palm Beach"
- "The Widow's Walk"
