= Woodbridge N. Ferris Building =

- U.S. National Register of Historic Places
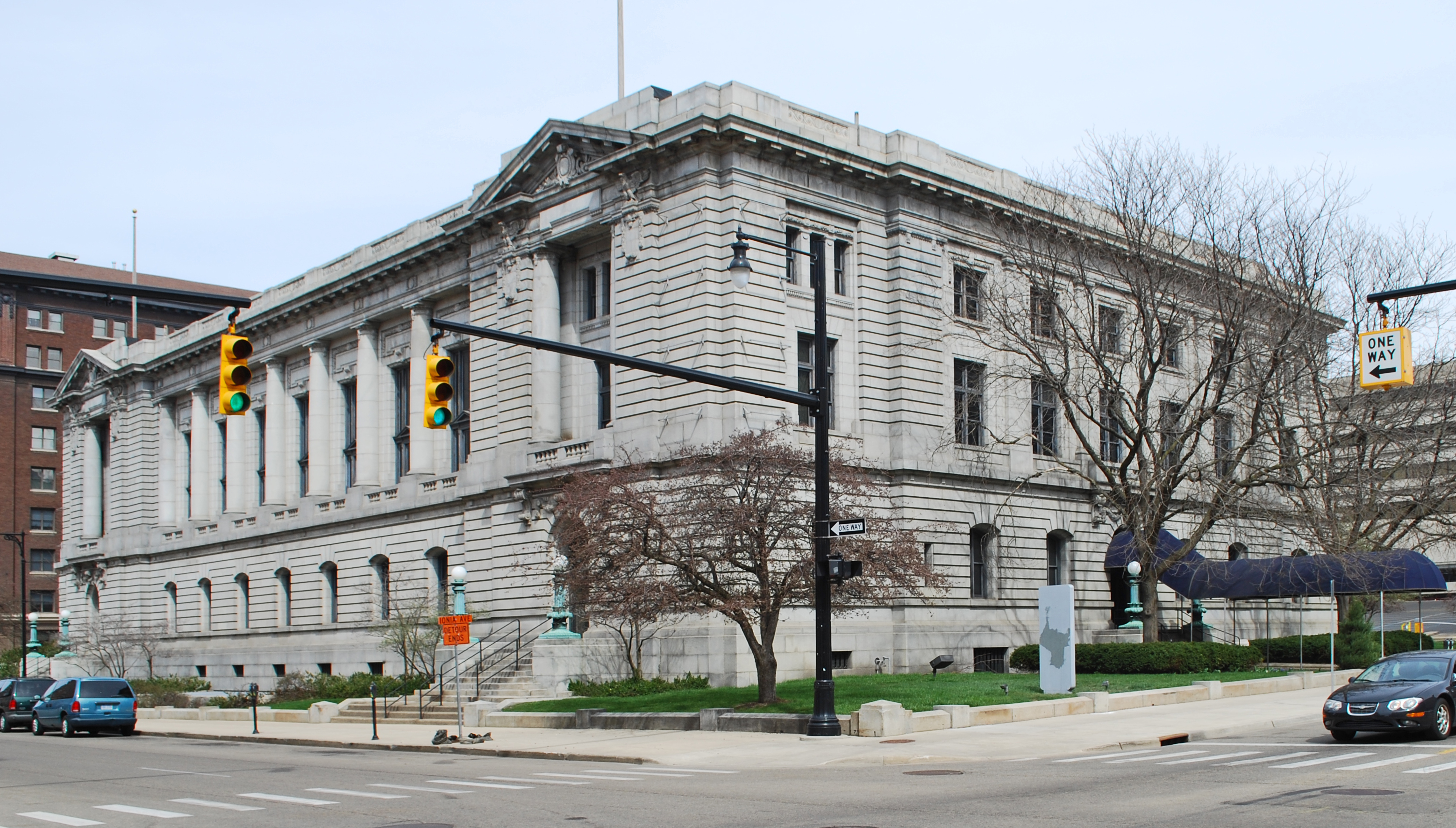

- Location within Michigan Location within the United States
- Interactive map showing the location of the Woodbridge N. Ferris Building
- Location: 17 Pearl St. NW Grand Rapids, Michigan
- Coordinates: 42°58′00″N 85°40′06″W
- Area: 1 acre (0.40 ha)
- Architect: James K. Taylor
- Architectural style: Academic Classic
- NRHP reference No.: 74000990
- Added to NRHP: July 10, 1974

The Woodbridge N. Ferris Building is a former federal building, which now houses classrooms and offices for the Kendall College of Art and Design, located at 17 Pearl St. NW in Grand Rapids, Michigan. It was formerly a U.S. District Court and Post Office. It was listed on the National Register of Historic Places in 1974.

== History ==
In 1906, Congress appropriated $500,000 to construct a new post office for Grand Rapids. In 1908, the supervising architect for the Treasury, James K. Taylor, created a design for the building, visiting Grand Rapids in April to determine a suitable material for the building's exterior. On February 12, 1909, Alice Roosevelt Longworth and her husband Nicholas Longworth III laid the building's cornerstone.

The building was used by the U.S. Circuit Court until 1912, as well as the U.S. District Court and the post office. In the 1950s, Gerald R. Ford had his congressional offices in the building. In 1972, the post office and the court moved out into a new building. By 1981, the bottom levels of the building were converted to house the Grand Rapids Art Museum.That same year, the federal government turned the building over to the city of Grand Rapids. The art museum moved to a new building in 2007, and the former post office building sat vacant, although occasionally used for art shows. In 2010, Ferris State University leased the building from the city, and began redeveloping the building for use by the Kendall College of Art and Design. Redevelopment was completed in 2013, and the building was renamed after the founder of Ferris State, Woodbridge N. Ferris.

== Description ==
The Woodbridge N. Ferris Building is a 3 1/2-story U-shaped Academic Classic building, constructed of structural steel with exterior masonry walls. The interior of the "U" is filled with a one-story portion of the building. It measures approximately 184 feet by 124 feet. The exterior is clad with stone, and the interior has concrete floors with mosaic surfaces, and interior partitions of plastered terra cotta. The roof originally had a slate surface, but is now covered with metal. The front facade is divided into three horizontal segments. The lower portion is the half-story basement, which is covered in large, smooth, stones and has small windows. The next segment contains the first story, a Renaissance Revival-style section containing large windows with arched heads and voussoired stones. The upper section of two floors contains half-round engaged columns along the front facade, modified into pilasters on the sides. Across the top is a classic cornice with small pediments at each end of the front facade.

== Gallery ==
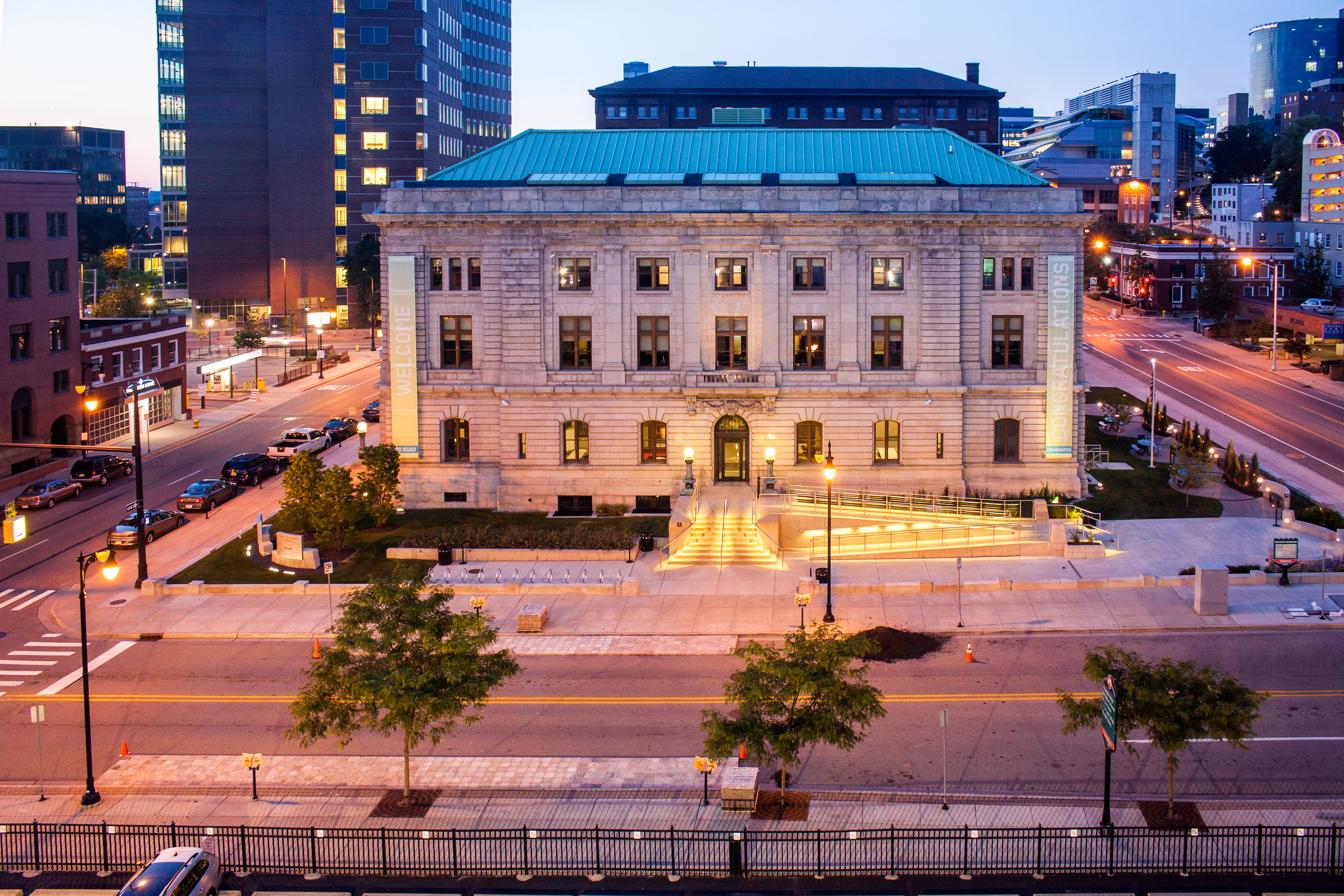

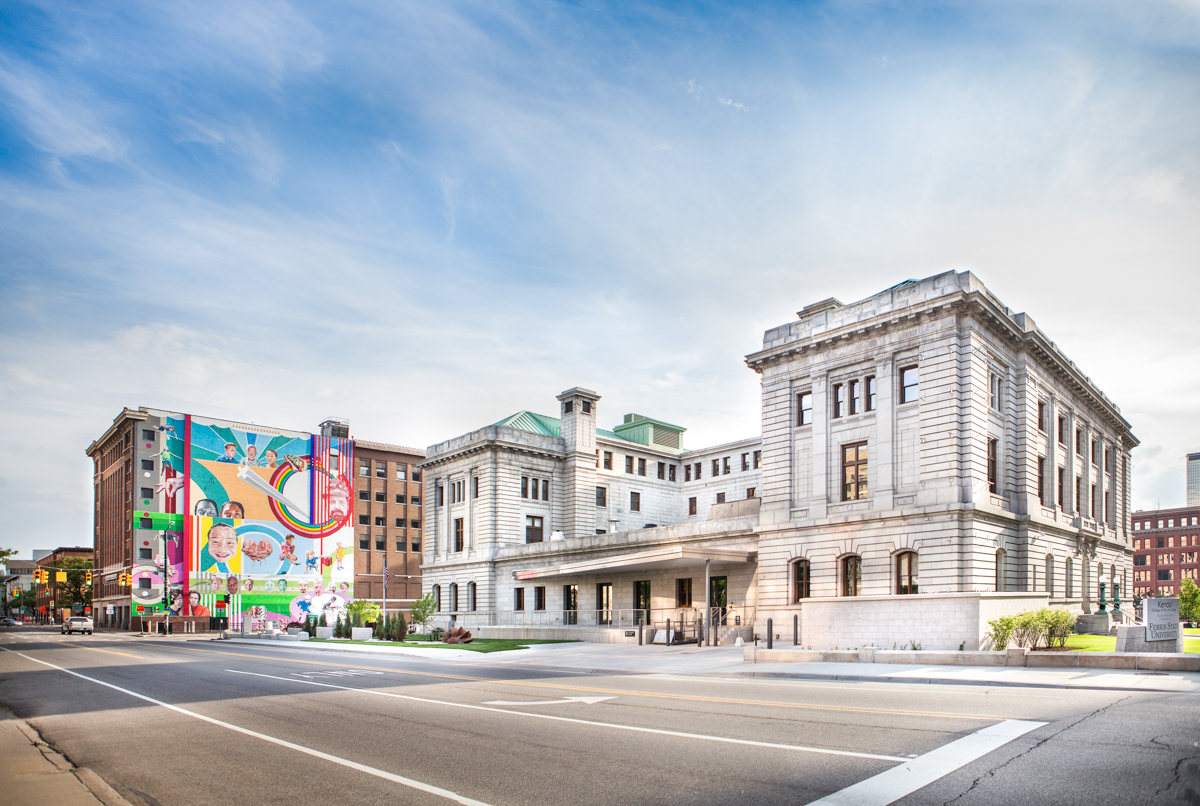

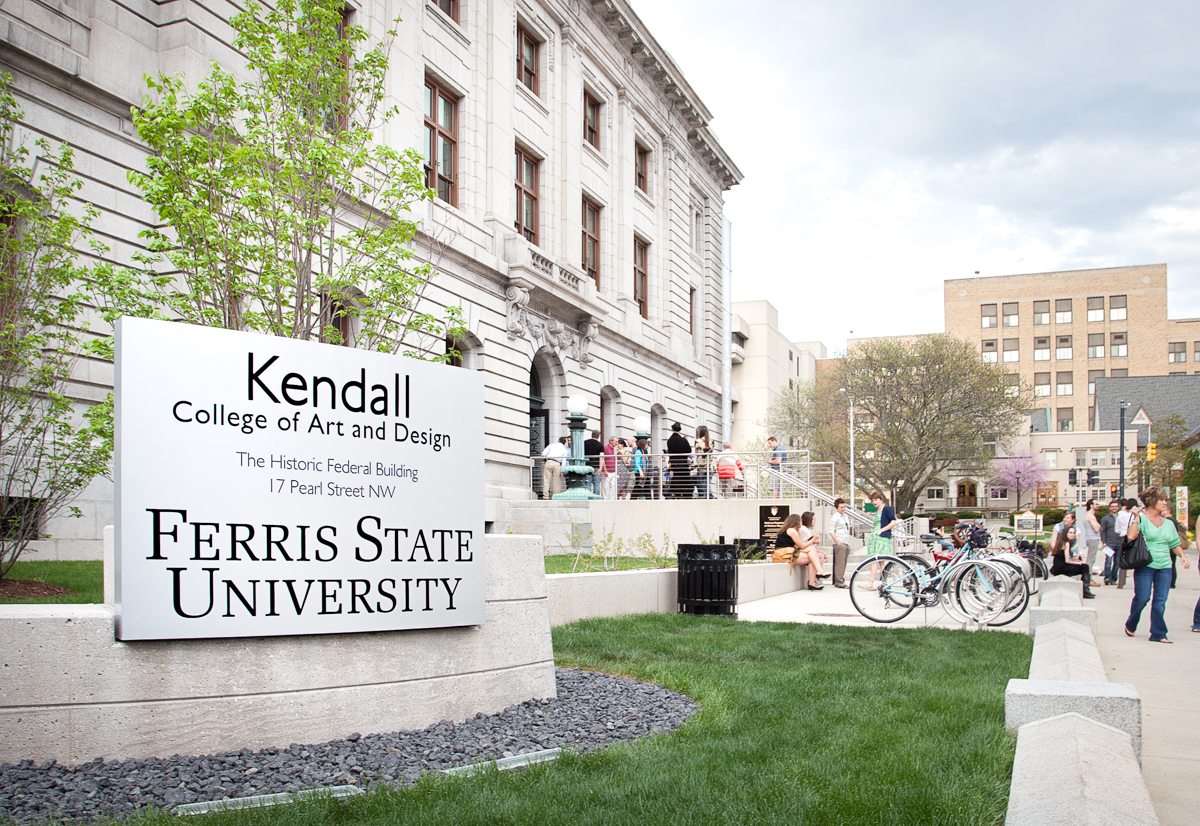
