= Charles Webster Leonard =

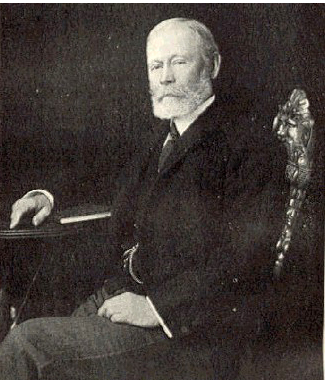
- Born: November 1, 1844; Sharon, Massachusetts, U.S.
- Died: November 2, 1941 (aged 97); New York City, U.S.
- Occupations: Industrialist, inventor
- Spouse: Emeline Thatcher Welch
- Children: Edgar Welch; Robert Jarvis; Charles Reginald

Charles W. Leonard (November 1, 1844 – November 2, 1941) was an American innovator in textile manufacturing, granite quarry excavation, as well as harness racing and rail transport.

Leonard was born in Sharon, Massachusetts, the eldest of seven children. He was the son of Benjamin S. Leonard and Esther (Smith) Leonard. Charles attended Stoughtonham Institute at Sharon. He began work in 1866 as a clerk and salesman with Jackson, Mandell & Daniells of Boston. In February 1880 Charles married Emeline Thatcher Welch. She was the daughter of attorney Wilson Jarvis Welch of Newton Centre, Mass. Emeline was also a Mayflower descendant through her ancestor Josiah Winslow. Her grandfather was Boston dry goods merchant Peter Thatcher.

John S. Holden and George F. Leonard acquired a Bennington, Vermont, mill in 1889 and started an operation under the name of John S. Holden Manufacturing Co. In 1892 John's eldest son Arthur joined the company and along with George's brother Charles W. Leonard of Newtonville, Mass., the name was then changed to Holden-Leonard & Co. as dry goods merchants, and began operating both the Bennington Woolen Mills and the Oneko Woolen Mills of New Bedford.

With the Holden-Leonard & Company running smoothly, in July 1896 John S. Holden, Charles W. Leonard and George H. Bickford purchased the undeveloped Woodbury Granite Company in Woodbury, Vermont, and supplied numerous government buildings with Woodbury Grey that included Chicago City Hall, Cook County Courthouse in Chicago, the Pennsylvania State Capitol, the Providence, Minneapolis and Grand Rapids Post Offices, as well as the state capitol buildings in Pennsylvania, Kentucky, Iowa and Idaho.,

The following year they purchased the Hardwick and Woodbury Railroad as a means of connecting the quarries of the Woodbury Granite Company and the Fletcher Granite Company on Robeson Mountain more directly with the outside world. The stock of the railroad was floated partly by popular subscription, but mainly by the backing of John S. Holden and his associates. Nine miles of track had to be built to reach the quarries (since increased to fifteen miles) and the grades were such that no ordinary engine could be coaxed to climb them. Undaunted, a Shay locomotive, a geared mountain-climbing engine, was purchased and put into service. Soon railroad operations consisted of quarry switching, main line hauling and yard switching with three Shays and a massive fleet of over 40 flat cars. There was also a quarry-village railroad connection that allowed quarry workers living in the village to commute to work. Monday through Saturday the train left Hardwick at 6:15 a.m. and returned from the quarries at 5 p.m. At the death of John S. Holden on March 23, 1907, Mr. Leonard then became president.

In 1918 Mr. Leonard was listed as a Director of the Waltham Watch Company, and in 1919 he served as a Director of the Boston Suburban Electric Companies, a holding company that had purchased the Middlesex and Boston Street Railway in 1910, working alongside highly respected Boston financier James L. Richards. Their children had married in January 1907. He was also an owner and served on the executive committee of the Readville Trotting Park, located half in the Hyde Park neighborhood of Boston and half in Dedham, Mass. It would later evolve into the Readville Race Track.

Leonard died on November 2, 1941, in New York City.

== The Big Mill ==
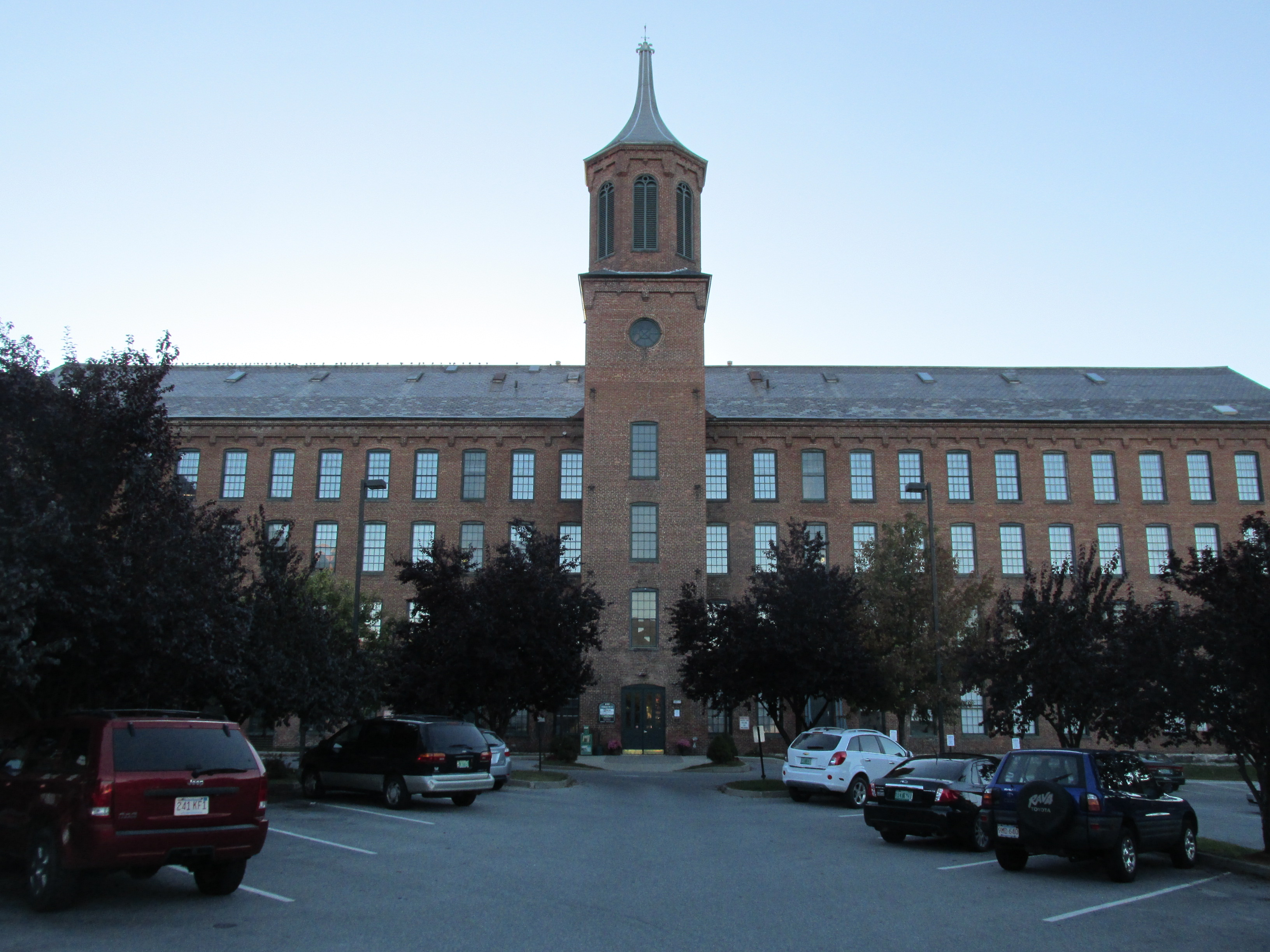
Holden-Leonard Mill Complex, Bennington, Vermont

With Vermont being the center of sheep farming of the period, The Bennington Woolen Mills was erected in 1865 under Hunt, Tillinghast & Co. This ownership remained intact until 1872 when Hunt became sole proprietor. In 1874 Hunt sold the mill to S. S. & M. Fisher of New York. Under the corporate name of Bennington Woolen Co., the Fishers converted the mill to the production of overcoatings made from wool shoddy. Optimistic about their prospects, the Fishers expanded the mill complex, adding more machinery and constructing an expansive one story brick addition. By 1880, the firm had some 400 employees operating 144 looms and approximately 12,000 spindles to produce over one-half million yards of heavy overcoating annually. The Fishers' operation of the Big Mill lasted only a few years.

Under the direction of Holden-Leonard the Bennington Mill, also known as the "Big Mill", had discontinued making Paisley shawls and was converted to produce knit stockings as well as wool and cotton underwear and later for ladies’ dress goods and cloth for men's clothing. The mill also produced fine wool dress fabrics, cloakings and cashmeres. Later modifications included fabricating Olin Scott's famous gunpowder machinery. Success was due in part to its close proximity to the Hudson River by way of the Hoosic River. Woolen products were shipped south to New York and Philadelphia, giving the company and the regional industry a huge boost. By 1895 the mill was employing 300, and had achieved the position of being the largest industrial venture in Southwestern Vermont.

As was typical of many mills in those days, there was an affiliated company store where the mill employees could run up a bill and have it deducted from their next pay. It carried about everything they might need: groceries, dry goods, boots and shoes, fruit, confectionery, cigars and tobacco, mill remnants, wall paper and window shades. Holden-Leonard also provided tenement housing for its employees and with a large number of children in the workforce found itself in the crosshairs of the Child Labor Reform movement at the turn of the 20th century.

Unprecedented expansion would soon follow, made possible in part by the demand for military uniform fabric during the First World War. Employment surged while the mill complex was being expanded again. By 1920, some 800 persons worked there, a figure approaching an historical maximum.

In June 1939 the Holden-Leonard Co. Inc. sold the entire mill complex and related employees' housing to Joseph Benn Textiles, Inc. of North Providence, Rhode Island. Another firm took over the complex and started production of knit goods under the name Bennington Mills. The new owners with its employment of 150–200 only lasted a decade. The closure in 1949 brought to a conclusion more than eighty years of textile manufacturing.
