= United States Post Office (Minneapolis, Minnesota) =

- U.S. National Register of Historic Places
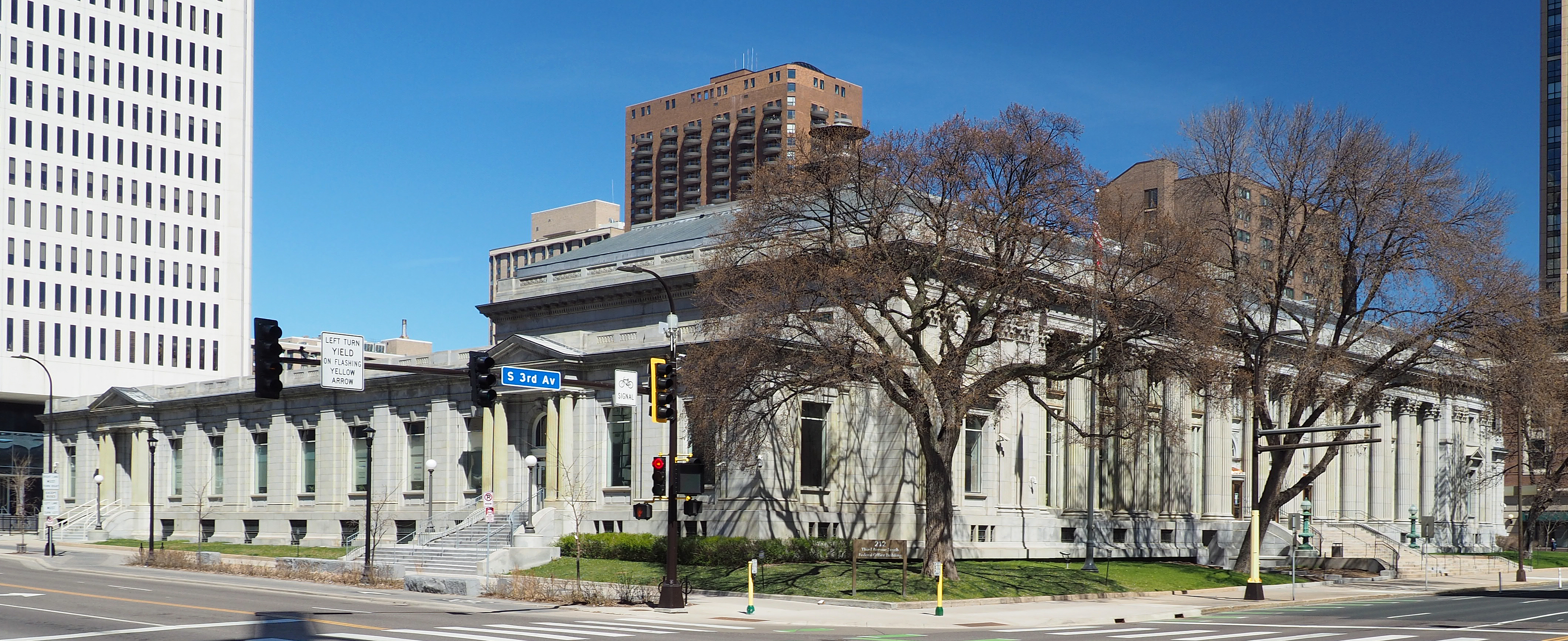
- The Post Office building from the south

- Location within Minnesota Location within the United States
- Interactive map showing the location for U.S. Post Office, Minneapolis
- Location: 212 3rd Ave. S., Minneapolis, Minnesota
- Coordinates: 44°58′47.46″N 93°15′50.55″W
- Area: 1 acre (0.40 ha)
- Built by: H.N. Leighton
- Architect: James Knox Taylor
- Architectural style: Neoclassical
- NRHP reference No.: 10000130
- Added to NRHP: April 1, 2010

The United States Post Office building in Minneapolis, Minnesota, also known as the "Old" Federal Building, is a structure listed on the National Register of Historic Places. It was built from 1912 through 1915 and served as the main post office for Minneapolis until the present-day Minneapolis Post Office building was completed in 1936. Since then, it has housed a variety of federal offices.

It became a focus for Vietnam War protests during the 1960s and 1970s, when the Armed Forces Examining and Entrance Station was located there. On April 3, 1968, demonstrators marched from Johnston Hall on the University of Minnesota campus to the Old Federal Building to participate in the Day of Resistance, a protest organized across the country. More protests ensued over the following years. On August 17, 1970, at 3 AM, a bomb was set off by the steps of the Second Street entrance. The explosion caused an estimated $500,000 of damage to the building, injured a security guard, and shattered windows up to several blocks away.

The building was listed on the National Register of Historic Places in 2010.

In 2022, Minnesota U.S. Senators Amy Klobuchar and Tina Smith introduced legislation to rename the building after Paul Wellstone. The building was renamed to the Paul D. Wellstone Federal Building in 2024. The Trump administration initially listed the building as surplus to federal requirements but the building was removed from that list later in 2025.

== See also ==
- Martin Olav Sabo Post Office, current Minneapolis post office
