= Dennis the Wild Bull =

Children's book by Dennis Rodman and Dustin Warburton

- First edition cover
- Author: Dennis Rodman and Dustin Warburton
- Illustrator: Daniel Monroe

Dennis the Wild Bull is a children's book co-written by Dennis Rodman and Dustin Warburton and illustrated by Dan Monroe. It is written in rhyme with many color illustrations.

== Plot ==
The story is about a bull named Dennis who is captured for the rodeo, but escapes back into the wild. He befriends a couple of other bulls at the rodeo, a Mexican and a White, and takes them with him when he returns to his family. Rodman described the book as showing that it is "OK to be different".

== Reception ==
Dennis the Wild Bull was featured on the Tonight Show with Jay Leno and the Late Night with Jimmy Fallon.
