= Readville Race Track =

Historic race track in Massachusetts

Coordinates: 42°13′46.87″N 71°8′1.95″W

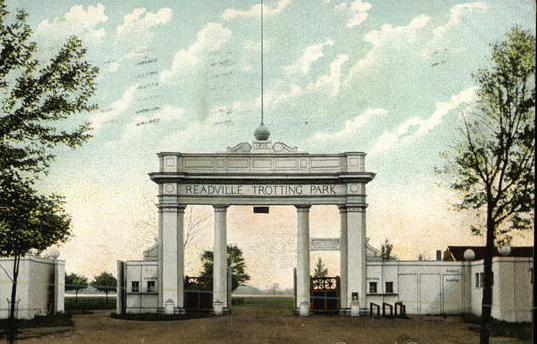
Readville Trotting Park

The Readville Race Track located in Readville, Massachusetts is a former race track that hosted harness racing, motorcycle racing, auto racing and early military combat aviation. When the track officially opened on August 25, 1896, it quickly became one of the premier venues for harness racing in the United States. It was known as one of the country's fastest courses and many records were broken there. In 1903 history was made at Readville when a five-year-old mare named Lou Dillon became the first trotter to run a two-minute mile. On August 25, 1908, it hosted the $50,000 American Trotting Derby won by Allan Winter; at the time, it was the largest prize pool in harness racing history.

== History ==
Originally the site of Camp Meigs and training grounds for the 54th Massachusetts Volunteer Infantry, in 1869 the Norfolk Agricultural Association purchased the land and built a half-mile track. Sold in 1895 to The New England Trotting Horse Breeders Association, the track was renamed the Readville Trotting Park and expanded to a full mile with the addition of a 3,400 seat grandstand, a clubhouse, restaurant, hotel and stable area. Railroad service was added by the New York, New Haven and Hartford Railroad to accommodate Boston, New York and Connecticut spectators. By 1899 Grand Circuit harness drivers were competing for a record $10,000 purse. The New York Times proclaimed "The August 23rd race was, without question, one of the finest exhibitions ever seen on this or any other track...and the crowd was the biggest yet."

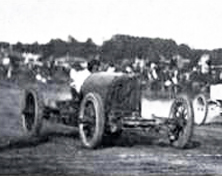
Barney Oldfield and the Green Dragon, Readville Race Track Sept 9, 1905

With the invention of the automobile, the public taste for racing shifted. In 1903 the first auto race was held at Readville. By 1905 ticket sales for "gas burners", including steam cars, electric cars and motorized bicycles eclipsed those of harness races with 12,000 spectators attending a milestone auto race on Memorial Day. The first recorded stock car race was held at Readville in 1906. At times huge dust clouds would form rendering goggles useless, and all the contestants faces would be covered in dirt.

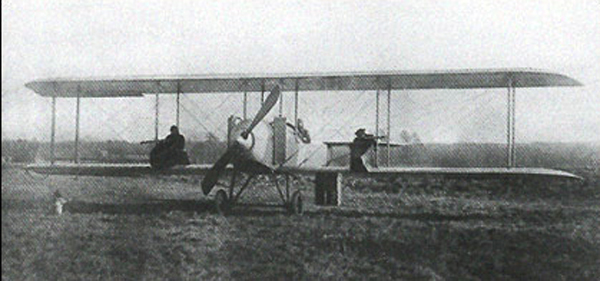
Sturtevant A-3 Battleplane Dec 12, 1915

The B. F. Sturtevant Company's Hyde Park factory was nearby, across the railroad tracks. Sturtevant's success had allowed them to expand in other areas. Led by B. F. Sturtevant's son-in-law Eugene "Noble" Foss, on December 12, 1915 the newly formed Sturtevant Aeroplane Company tested its new A-3 Battleplane prototype next door on the Readville field, becoming the first American airplane engineered specifically for air combat. Designed by Grover C. Loening, most recently the Army’s aeronautical engineer at San Diego and hired by Sturtevant, the A-3 featured a water cooled 140 hp. Sturtevant V-8 engine with two removable 8’ X 2.5’ nacelles positioned mid-wing for machine gunners to fire outside the propeller arc. The concept plane was piloted by Lt. Byron Jones. Remarkably, the Army and Navy had no specific interest in a combat aircraft at the time. So although it was the first of its kind in America, there was no demand or funds to purchase any airplane other than for observation and training.

Horse and auto racing continued to coexist until the late 1920s when cars finally won out. In 1926 ownership passed from Charles W. Leonard to the New York, New Haven and Hartford Railroad. In the early 1930s the track was modified using fill from the newly constructed Sumner Tunnel resulting in a harder surface with steeper banks to accommodate higher speeds. Until closing in May 1937 Readville hosted all the top drivers of the era. By World War II, the site was largely abandoned, although U.S. Navy pilots from Naval Air Station Squantum flying their Stearman biplanes would practice "touch and go" landings on the remnants of the old oval track.
