= City Hall Square Building =

Skyscraper in Chicago, Illinois (1912-1965)

Coordinates: 41.8842°N 87.6306°W

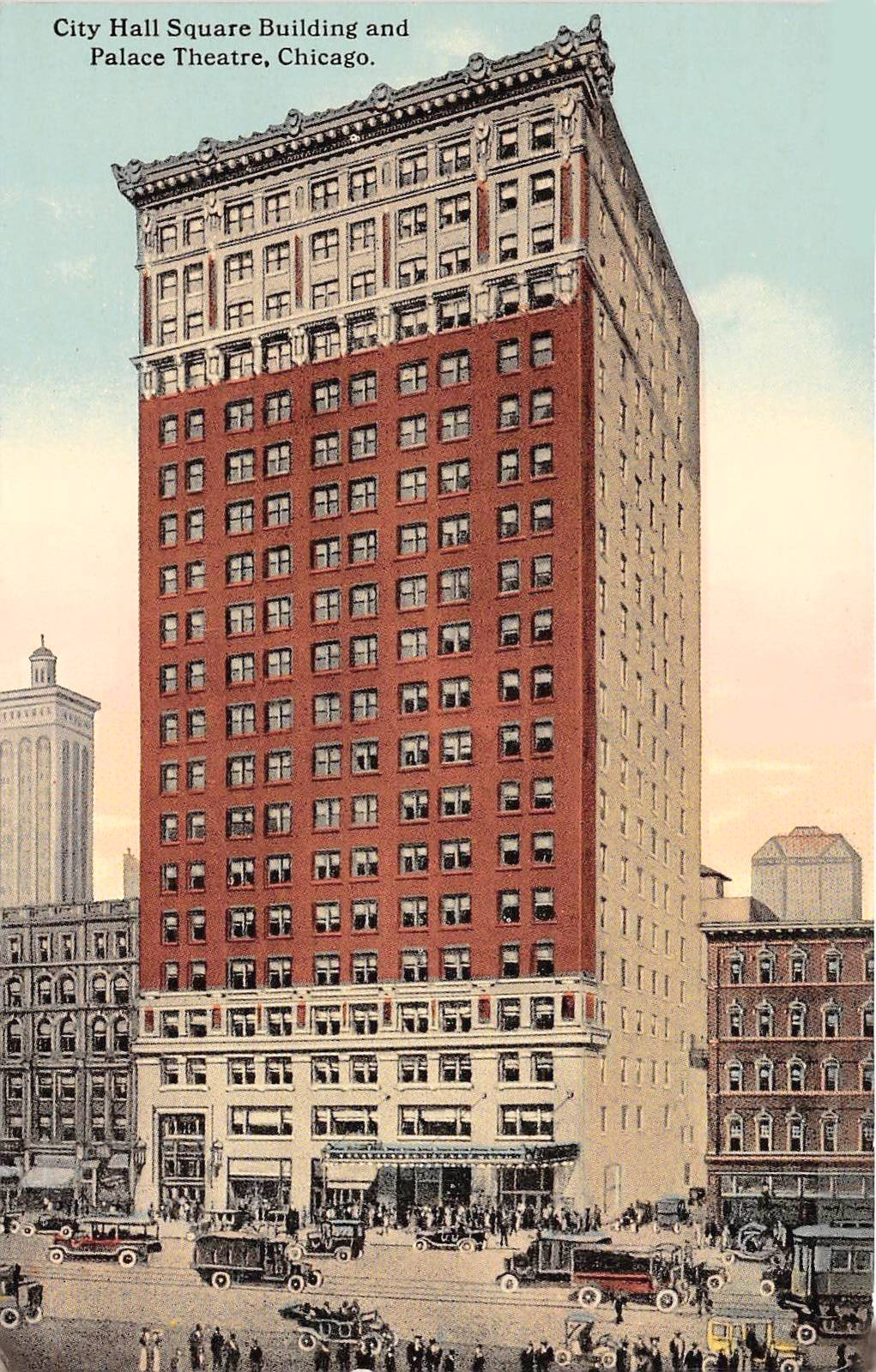
City Hall Square and the Palace Theatre, in a 1920s postcard.

The City Hall Square Building was a 259 ft (79 m) tall building located on North Clark Street in Chicago, Illinois, United States. It was completed in 1912 however was destroyed and replaced in 1965 by the Richard J. Daley Center.

It had 21 floors and was located opposite Chicago City Hall. Demolished in 1965 for construction of the Daley Center, it was an office building built in the neo-classical style. Ornamental stone cladding was used for the upper façade and the lower four floors while the mid-façade was brick. It was designed by Christian A. Eckstorm.
