= Vermont Route 214 =

State highway in Washington County, Vermont, US

Vermont Route 214
- Map of Washington County in central Vermont with VT 214 highlighted in red

Route information
- Maintained by VTrans
- Length: 2.061 mi (3.317 km)
- Existed: 1955–present

Major junctions
- South end: US 2 in Plainfield
- North end: VT 14 in East Montpelier

Location
- Country: United States
- State: Vermont
- Counties: Washington

Highway system
- State highways in Vermont
← VT 207	→ VT 215

Vermont Route 214 (VT 214) is a 2.061-mile-long (3.317 km) state highway located in Washington County, Vermont, United States. The route begins at a junction with US 2 in the town of Plainfield. The route serves a short connector to VT 14 in the town of East Montpelier. The route, which was first designated in 1955, passes nearby Goddard College.

== Route description ==
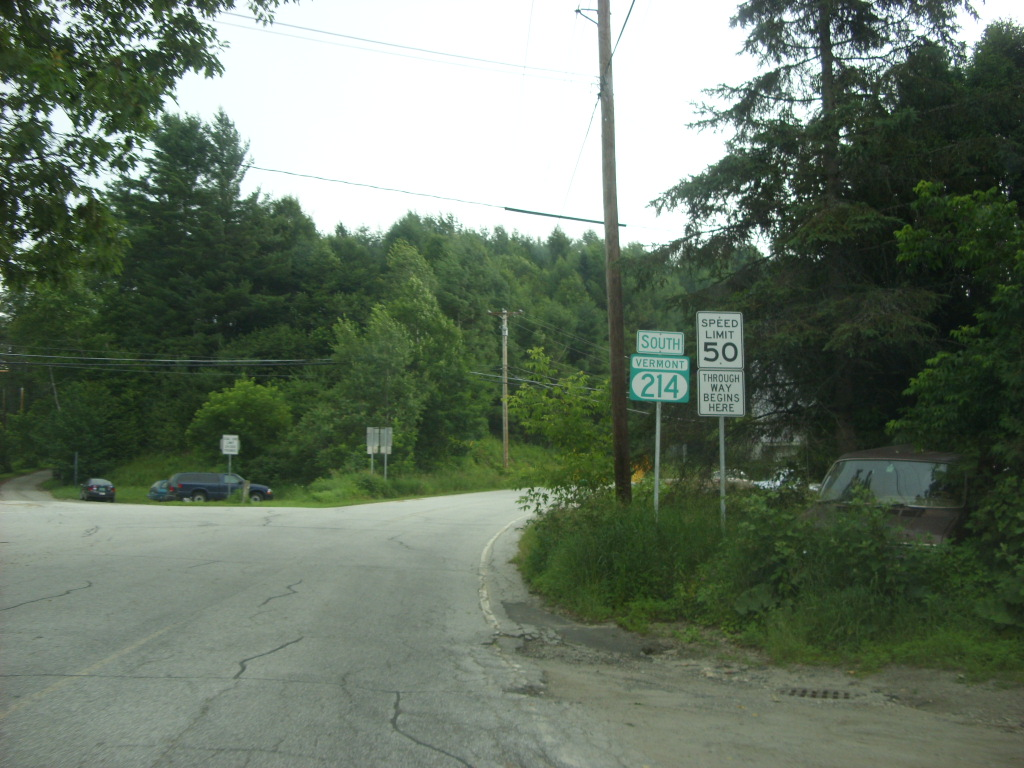
VT 214 southbound in East Montpelier

VT 214 begins at a junction with U.S. Route 2 (High Street) in the town of Plainfield near the shores of the Winooski River. The route runs northwest along the eastern edge of the campus of Goddard College, passing a junction with Pitkin Road, which serves as the main road through the campus. Shortly after Sugarwood Road, VT 214 runs northwest into the town of Marshfield for a short distance. Now entering the town of East Montpelier, the route passes several fields and residences, which soon winds north through a stretch of dense woods. After making a slow bend to the northwest, VT 214 into the hamlet of North Montpelier and into a junction with VT 14. The junction marks the northern terminus of VT 214 and the right-of-way ends at this junction.

== History ==
VT 214 was first designated on its current alignment in 1955 because of a move of the Vermont State Legislature.

== Major intersections ==
The entire route is in Washington County.

Location	mi	km	Destinations	Notes
Plainfield	0.000	0.000	US 2 (Main Street) – St. Johnsbury, Marshfield, East Montpelier, Montpelier	Southern terminus
East Montpelier	2.061	3.317	VT 14 – East Montpelier, Montpelier, East Calais, Woodbury	Northern terminus
1.000 mi = 1.609 km; 1.000 km = 0.621 mi
