= U32 =

U-32 may refer to:

- German submarine U-32, one of several German submarines
- SM U-32 (Austria-Hungary), a U-27-class submarine of the Austro-Hungarian Navy
- Small nucleolar RNA SNORD32
- Small snub icosicosidodecahedron
- Uint32_t, a 32-bit unsigned integer
- Union 32 High School, in East Montpelier, Vermont
