= North Montpelier, Vermont =

- Village
- Location within Vermont
- Coordinates: 44°18′13″N 72°26′47″W
- Country: United States
- State: Vermont
- County: Washington
- Elevation: 709 ft (216 m)
- Time zone: UTC-5 (Eastern (EST))
  - Summer (DST): UTC-4 (EDT)
- ZIP code: 05666
- Area code: 802
- GNIS feature ID: 1458748

North Montpelier is an unincorporated village in the town of East Montpelier, Washington County, Vermont, United States. The community is located at the junction of Vermont routes 14 and 214, 7 miles (11 km) east-northeast of Montpelier.
