= Harwood Union Middle and High School =

Harwood Union High School

Location
- 458 VT Route 100; Duxbury, Vermont 05660; United States; 44.253837°N 72.786494°W

Information
- Type: Public
- Established: 1967
- School district: Harwood Unified Union School District
- Superintendent: Mike Leichliter
- Principal: Megan McDonough
- Teaching staff: 60.80 (on FTE basis)
- Grades: 7 to 12
- Enrollment: 550 (2023-2024)
- Student to teacher ratio: 9.05
- Colors: Black and gold
- Slogan: Give respect, get respect
- Sports: Wrestling, cross country running, soccer, hockey, tennis, field hockey, lacrosse, basketball, cross country skiing, track and field, baseball, and bass fishing
- Mascot: Highlander
- Nickname: HUHS
- Team name: Highlanders
- Budget: US$11,243,609
- Website: www.harwood.org

Harwood Union Middle and High School is a mid-sized public secondary school located in Duxbury, Vermont. As a member of the Harwood Unified Union School District, the school serves the towns of Duxbury, Fayston, Moretown, Waitsfield, Warren, and Waterbury. It was formerly a part of the Harwood Union High School District #19 or "Harwood UHSD #19."

== History and overview ==
Ground broke in 1964 for the construction of Harwood High School. Situated in South Duxbury, the school was built on a 20-acre (81,000 m^{2}) plot of land and cost approximately $1.6 million to build. Construction was completed in early 1966 and the doors opened for the 1966–1967 school year. Harwood is named after Dr. Charles Harwood, a local physician who served at the births of a large number of the school's original students. Harwood is a union high school, meaning it serves multiple towns. These towns are Waitsfield, Warren, Fayston, Moretown, Duxbury, Waterbury, and Waterbury Center for the high school and Waitsfield, Warren, Fayston and Moretown for the middle school. In 1997, Harwood underwent a $7.2 million renovation in order to modernize its facilities as well as add a dedicated Middle School wing of the school. These renovations included a new exterior design featuring a curved front roof meant to look like a turning page. Notably, Harwood began a compost program for its students in the school year of 2011–2012 to help the environment.

== Students and sports ==
Harwood serves approximately 550 High School students and 150 Middle School students. The school falls into the Vermont Principals' Association Division 2 for all sports (as of 2007). Harwood Athletics include; Soccer, Field Hockey, Cross Country Running, Basketball, X/C Skiing, Alpine Skiing, Freestyle Skiing, Hockey, Gymnastics, Wrestling, Baseball, Lacrosse, Golf, Tennis and Softball. Harwood has become a seasonal favorite in Cross Country Running and Track, as well as Boys' Soccer and X/C Skiing.

Harwood boasts recent State Championships in 2007, 2008 2009, and 2011 Boys' Cross Country, 2007 Boys' Soccer; 2021 Boys' Lacrosse, 2009 and 2010 Boys' Track and Field. 2008 Boys' Soccer were State Runners up, after a loss to U-32 HS, 2008 Boys' Basketball were State Semi-finalists, and 2008 Boys' Lacrosse made it to the State Quarterfinals. The Boys' and Girls' Cross Country teams won the 2009 and 2014 state championships sending both teams to New Englands. Girls' Cross Country were 2010, 2011, 2018, and 2021 State Champions. The Girls' soccer team finished as state runners-up in 2009 and took home the Championship in 2010. The Girls' Field Hockey team has also won three straight championships, 2010–2012. The Girls' Ice Hockey also got state-runner up in 2011. Harwood also swept all categories Player of the Year in 2010.

In October 2016, Harwood students Mary Harris, Cyrus Zschau, Liam Hale, and Eli Brookens were killed in a head-on traffic collision. In ensuing days the slogan "Harwood Strong" was created as a reaction to the untimely deaths of the students. Schools across Vermont sent flowers and notes of condolence to Harwood, and a few days after the crash South Burlington High School students even wore black and gold as a show of support for grieving Harwood community.

== Notable alumni ==
- Stephen R. Bissette, comic book artist and publisher, known for his work with Alan Moore on Swamp Thing
- Caitlin Compton Gregg, Olympic Nordic ski racer
- Stephen Groff, economist and Governor of the National Development Fund of Saudi Arabia
- Nolan Kasper, Olympic downhill ski racer
- Ilari Melart, Finnish ice hockey player
- Bill Parker, artist and scientist, known for inventing the plasma globe
- Grace Potter, singer-songwriter and musician, member of Grace Potter and the Nocturnals
- Shaina Taub, actress, singer, musician, and Tony Award-winning composer of Suffs
- Paul Wennberg, scientist, 2002 MacArthur Foundation Fellow
