= Stephen Groff =

Economist and Governor of the National Development Fund of Saudi Arabia

Stephen P Groff

Governor of the National Development Fund
- Incumbent
- Assumed office February 2019

Ranking vice president of the Asian Development Bank
- In office September 2011 – February 2019
- Preceded by: C. Lawrence Greenwood

Personal details
- Born: Camp Lejeune, North Carolina, USA
- Spouse: Maria Theresa O. Regalado
- Education: Yale University, Harvard University, Erasmus University
- Occupation: Economist

Stephen P Groff is an economist and Governor of the National Development Fund of Saudi Arabia.

Groff was appointed as Governor of the National Development Fund (NDF) in February 2019. He is responsible for establishing this new $130 billion development finance institution with the objective of supporting economic diversification and raising the level of performance of sectoral funds and development banks in Saudi Arabia.

He was previously ranking vice-president of the Asian Development Bank (ADB) in Manila, Philippines. At ADB he was responsible for operations in East Asia, Southeast Asia, and the Pacific, amounting to over $6 billion in new lending every year and a portfolio of $35 billion.

== Education ==
Groff was raised in Warren, Vermont, and graduated from Harwood Union High School He has a BS from Yale University, an MPA from the Kennedy School at Harvard University, and a PhD from the School of Social and Behavioural Sciences at Erasmus University. He earned the Pearson–FT Non-Executive Director SRF BTEC Level 7 diploma and is a member of the Council on Foreign Relations.

== Career ==
In February 2019, Groff became the inaugural Governor of the National Development Fund (NDF). With a capital of $130 billion, NDF was established to enhance economic diversification as well as to promote sustainable development financing in the Kingdom of Saudi Arabia. NDF oversees different Saudi development funds and banks, supervises their performance and efficiency, and ensures that each entity contributes effectively to Saudi Vision 2030. Under his leadership, NDF spearheaded the development of a number of new funds, including the National Infrastructure Fund through a partnership with BlackRock.

Groff was appointed as Vice President of the Asian Development Bank (ADB) in September 2011. Previously, he served as Deputy Director for Development Cooperation at the Paris-based Organisation for Economic Co-operation and Development and as Deputy Vice-President for Operations at the Washington-based Millennium Challenge Corporation. He has also worked for the U.S. Agency for International Development, the U.S. Refugee Program and as a U.S. Peace Corps volunteer.

Groff serves on a number of advisory boards, including the Millennium Challenge Corporation, the International Finance Forum, CCICED, World Learning, Bretton Woods Committee, Marine Stewardship Council, Institute for Sustainable Communities and the Global Footprint Network.

Groff also writes regularly on a variety of climate change and development-related issues, including The Hill, Project Syndicate, The Wall Street Journal, The Guardian and The Huffington Post.

In 2018, Groff was identified by Richtopia as one of the top 100 leaders from multilateral organizations.

== Personal life ==
Groff is married, and has two children. His family has lived in Vermont for generations, and their roots there can be traced back to the 18th century. His Great-grandfather was the photographer Edmund Homer Royce of St. Albans. His 3rd Great-grandfather was Vermont Congressman and Chief Justice Homer Elihu Royce and his 4th Great-uncle was Vermont Governor and Chief Justice Stephen Royce. Also, his 5th Great-grandfather was Major Steven Royce, who was a delegate to the convention that signed the 1774 Dorset Accords which led to an independent Vermont Republic and future statehood. Groff speaks Tagalog and French and is a sailor and triathlete.

== Selected publications ==
- Integrating media studies concepts into theories of the policy process: Enhancing the role of news media as a climate service in the wake of recurring extreme weather events. Journal of Environmental Media – March 1, 2023.
- The turbulent waters of climate action: Public trust, public attention, and climate policy intractability in developed countries. Erasmus University, Rotterdam – February 2, 2023.
- Organizing the Asian Development Bank: Radical Transformation or Degenerative Irrelevance? The Elgar Companion to the Asian Development Bank – September 21, 2022.
- The Contemporary Social Contract and Conditions of Climate Policy Intractability. Global Perspectives – October 17, 2022.
- A contemporary social contract : An exploration of enabling factors influencing climate policy intractability in developed nations. Global Policy – August 5, 2022.
- International Climate Cooperation and the Watershed of Policy Streams. The Journal of Comparative Policy Analysis – January 10, 2022.]
- Magnifying Focusing Events: Global Smoke Plumes and International Construal Connections in Newspaper Coverage of 2020 Wildfire Events. Frontiers in Communication – August 13, 2021.
- China’s City Clusters: Pioneering Future Mega-Urban Governance. American Affairs - May 21, 2019.
- To Resist the Robots, Invest in People. Project Syndicate - January 2, 2018.
- A buffer against protectionism. Boao Review - April 3, 2017.
- Climate Change Challenges for Vermont. VT Digger - March 19, 2017.
- An Infrastructure Crisis? Huffington Post - March 3, 2017.
- The Next Migrant Wave. Project Syndicate - December 29, 2016.
- How Will ASEAN Members Cope with Their Climate Change Challenge? Knowledge Wharton - March 10, 2016.
- Putting out Indonesia’s Fires. Project Syndicate - December 4, 2015.
- Overcoming Southeast Asia’s Barriers to Trade. The Wall Street Journal - June 30, 2015.
- Shifting the Gear toward Green Growth. People's Daily - October 17, 2014.
- Asean's Infrastructure Crisis. The Wall Street Journal - July 28, 2014.
- This Time We Must All Be Filipino. The Philippine Daily Inquirer - November 30, 2013.
- Will this be the 'Asian century'? The Guardian - April 18, 2012.
- The Peace Corps: Is Fifty Years Enough? The Huffington Post - August 28, 2011.
- Getting Value for Money: Effective Aid, Effective Development. Global Asia – June 10, 2011.
- Fund the fight against global poverty. The Christian Science Monitor - October 3, 2008.
