= Montpelier High School (Vermont) =

Coordinates: 44.260337°N 72.5876097°W

Location
- 5 High School Drive; Montpelier, Vermont 05602

Information
- Type: Public secondary
- Established: 1914; Current building: 1956, addition 1998
- School district: Montpelier Roxbury Public Schools District (2018-); Montpelier Public Schools (-2018)
- Principal: Jason Gingold
- Teaching staff: 35.80 (FTE)
- Enrollment: 371 (2023-2024)
- Student to teacher ratio: 10.36
- Colors: Green, white
- Athletics: 17 sports teams, 12 sports
- Athletics conference: Vermont Principals' Association
- Mascot: Screech the Owl
- Team name: Solons
- Activities: 20 clubs and organizations
- Website: https://www.mrpsvt.org/mhs

Montpelier High School (MHS) is a public secondary school, comprising grades 9–12, located in Montpelier, Vermont. MHS serves the Montpelier Roxbury Public Schools District. Schools in the district also include Union Elementary School, and Main Street Middle School.

Montpelier is located near the center of Vermont in Washington County.

The school's sports teams are called the Solons and the school's colors are green and white. Enrollment in 2006 was 420; in 2012 it was 317.

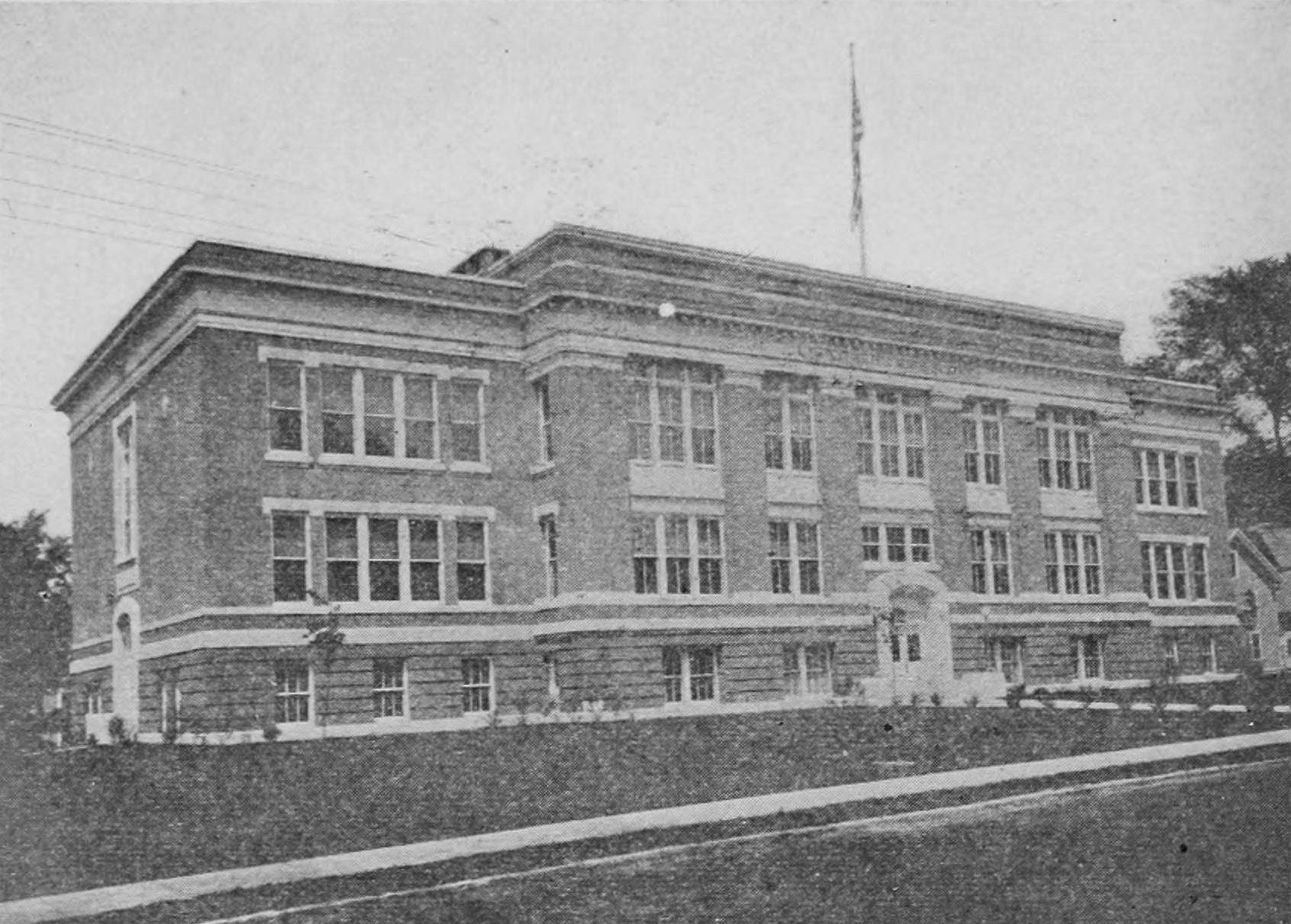
Montpelier High School, 1915

Montpelier High School, 2006

== Recognition ==
U.S. News & World Report ranked Montpelier High School in the top 500 out of over 18,000 high schools in the United States in November 2007. They initially and incorrectly reported that the school ranked fifth. The school brought the error to the magazine's attention shortly thereafter, prompting a correction on December 10, 2007. The school's correct ranking still puts it in the top 2.8% of American high schools and the best in Vermont (by U.S. News standards).

== History ==
MHS is a successor to the Washington County Grammar School, incorporated in 1813. Montpelier High School first issued diplomas in 1914, the year a new high school building opened on Main Street. That building was replaced by the current building, off Bailey Avenue, which opened in 1956. The old high school building was converted to a middle school, and continues to house grades 5, 6, 7, and 8. The present high school building was enlarged in 1998.

== Academics ==
As of 2006, MHS offers 7 AP classes: Biology, US history, English, Calculus, Statistics, Programming, and Spanish. It offers French, Spanish, and Latin at several levels. Students at Main Street Middle School are offered French I, Spanish I, and Algebra I. Upon successful completion of these courses, students may earn high school credit. MHS is also a site for interning student teachers from the University of Vermont.

As of February 2006, 17 students were attending the Barre Technical Center in the neighboring town. This is a technical and vocational school. Juniors and seniors are eligible to attend.

Courses in MHS's English department include Interpretation of Literature, Irish Humanities, and Creative Writing. Mathematics courses include Economics; Functions, Statistics and Trigonometry; Statistics; and Calculus. Science classes include Integrated Science, Biology, Chemistry, Physics, and Environmental Applications as well as basic and AP computer programming. Social studies classes include World History, Psychology, and Sociology.

=== Scholastic Aptitude Test ===
In 2010, the school was first in the state with a 1,705 average score on the Scholastic Aptitude Test. The state average was 1,546. The national average was 1,509.

In 2005, 74 seniors, 85% of the senior class, took the SAT.

SAT Verbal	Montpelier Average All Students	Vermont Average All Students	National Average All Students
2001	550	511	506
2002	560	512	504
2003	547	513	507
2004	578	516	508
2005	557	521	508

Back of MHS

SAT Math	Montpelier Average All students	Vermont Average All students	National Average All students
2001	538	506	514
2002	561	510	516
2003	547	510	519
2004	556	512	518
2005	541	517	520

== Clubs and extra-curricular activities ==
MHS has 20 clubs open to all students, including:

- Outing Club – This offers opportunities for students to participate in activities like backpacking, hiking, winter camping, canoeing, hiking, caving, rock climbing, and much more.
- Masque – The school's theater program. Masque puts on a two plays a year; one being a musical.
- The Solon Spectrum – The school's newspaper. It is published online every month. https://web.archive.org/web/20161102135846/http://www.solonspectrum.com/

== Athletics ==
Most sports have a varsity and a junior varsity team. MHS plays in Division II in every sport, except track and field and boys' tennis. In 2015, the boys' cross country running team won the Division II state championship.

These sports are offered at MHS:

Fall season

South side of MHS

- Boys' soccer
- Girls' soccer
- Girls' field hockey
- Boys' cross country running
- Girls' cross country running
- Girls' volleyball

Winter season

- Boys' basketball
- Girls' basketball
- Boys' cross-country skiing
- Girls' cross-country skiing
- Girls' gymnastics
- Boys' ice hockey
- Girls' ice hockey

Spring season

- Baseball
- Golf
- Boys' lacrosse
- Boys' tennis
- Girls' tennis
- Boys' ultimate Frisbee
- Girls' ultimate Frisbee
- Boys' track and field
- Girls' track and field

The school also participates in Unified Sports, a program of Special Olympics. Unified Sports teams consist of all types of students, including those who are disabled. The unified sports include soccer, bowling, snowshoeing, basketball, and softball. They compete against other schools.

MHS has many sports facilities on campus, including:

- Baseball diamond with field hockey/soccer/lacrosse field in outfield and a scoreboard
- Soccer/football field surrounded with a dirt/fine gravel track with grandstand and scoreboard
- Softball diamond with scoreboard
- Field hockey/lacrosse field
- Four outdoor tennis courts
- Basketball court in gym
- Weight room, recently repainted and renovated with new workout machines
- Climbing wall
- Outdoor 400 meter track

Hockey is played at the Montpelier Civic Center. The ski team skis at a variety of locations, sometimes at the school but usually at U-32 or at the Morse Farm Touring Center nearby. The golf and tennis teams play scheduled games off-campus. The cross country teams practice together at a variety of locations, including Hubbard Park and the North Branch Nature Center. The gymnastics team practices and hosts home competitions at Central Vermont Gymnastics Academy in Waterbury.

== Greenhouse and composting ==
The greenhouse

MHS is home to a solar greenhouse. Students built it in 2004 from lumber from fallen trees. The goal of the greenhouse was to reduce the school's ecological footprint and to be an example of sustainability. The greenhouse also has a web cam that has operated seasonally. Students who take biology are responsible for planting, watering and harvesting their sections of the greenhouse.

Organic greens grown in the greenhouse are used in the school cafeteria. Food waste from the kitchen and cafeteria have been composted and used in the greenhouse's soil.

== Library Media Center ==
The Montpelier High School library media program is constantly evolving to best meet the needs of students, staff and community members. The fiction collection is continuously expanded and updated with newly-published and classic books in various formats. The non-fiction and reference collection is kept current with online database subscriptions. The library website allows access to these databases, online newspapers, the library catalog, research support, tech and social media tips as well as reading suggestions. These services are available 24/7 from any device with internet access or in the library during school hours. Multimedia equipment (video and audio recorders, tripods, laptops and other devices) are also available for school related projects. The space is open, light filled, flexible and accessible and hosts a wide range of academic, social and civic activities throughout the year.

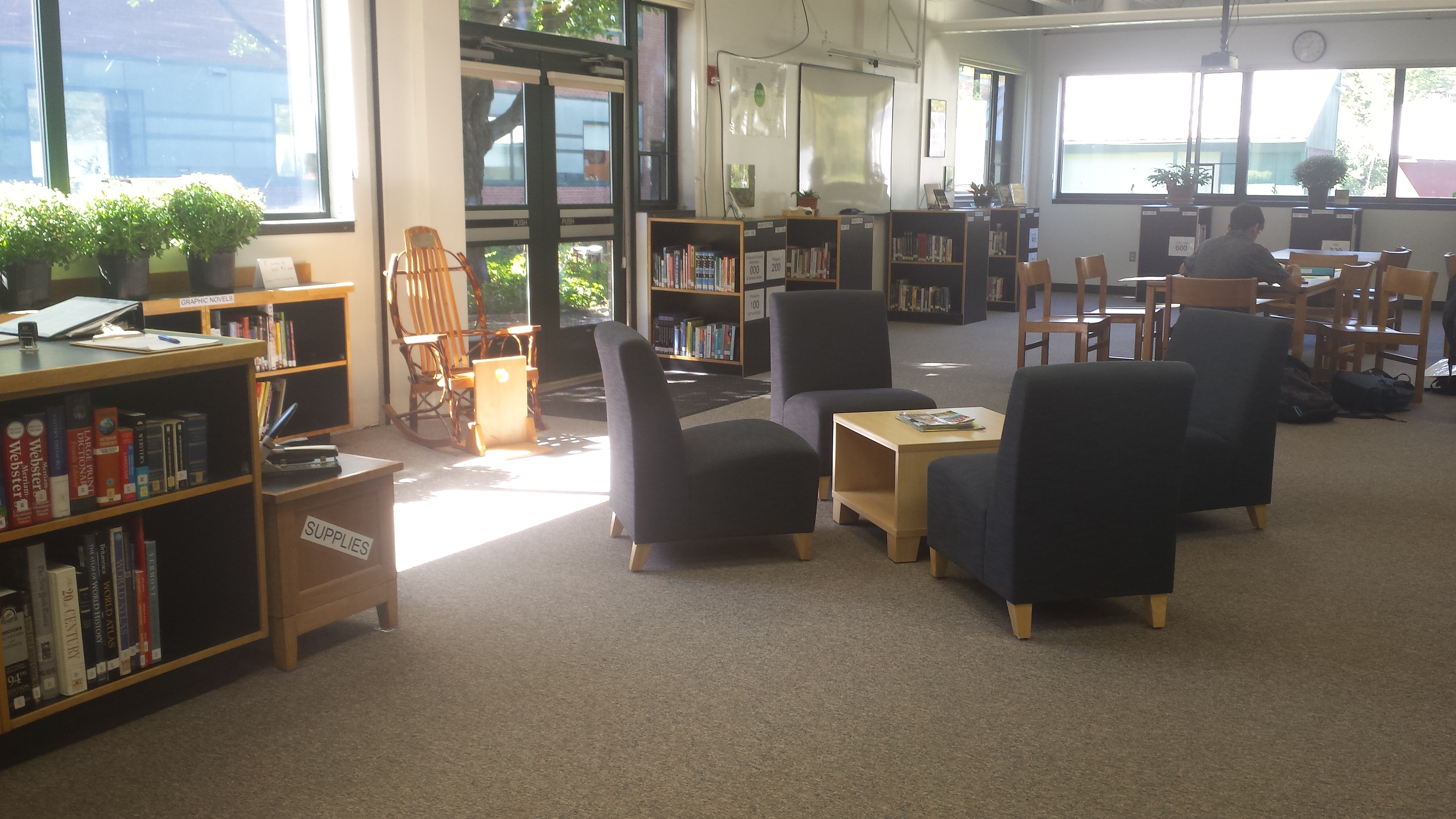
Montpelier High School library

== Notable alumni ==
- J. Ward Carver, Vermont Attorney General 1925–1931
- Richard A. Cody (class of 1968), Vice Chief of Staff of the United States Army 2004–2008
- William Charles Fitzgerald (class of 1956), Vietnam war hero
- Garrett Graff, editor and writer
- Levi R. Kelley, Vermont State Treasurer 1943–1949
- F. Ray Keyser Jr. (class of 1945), Governor of Vermont 1961–1963
- Amanda Pelkey (class of 2011), former professional ice hockey player and Olympic Gold Medalist
- Charles Tetzlaff (class of 1956), United States Attorney for the District of Vermont 1993–2001
- Bob Yates (class of 1956), former AFL offensive lineman for the Boston Patriots

== See also ==
- List of high schools in Vermont
