= Waitsfield (CDP), Vermont =

Census-designated place in Vermont, United States

Waitsfield, Vermont
- Census-designated place
- Location in Washington County and the state of Vermont
- Coordinates: 44°11′15″N 72°49′45″W
- Country: United States
- State: Vermont
- County: Washington

Area
  - Total: 0.40 sq mi (1.03 km^{2})
  - Land: 0.39 sq mi (1.00 km^{2})
  - Water: 0.015 sq mi (0.04 km^{2})
- Elevation: 699 ft (213 m)

Population (2010)
  - Total: 164
  - Density: 425/sq mi (164/km^{2})
- Time zone: UTC-5 (Eastern (EST))
  - Summer (DST): UTC-4 (EDT)
- ZIP code: 05673
- Area code: 802
- FIPS code: 50-75250
- GNIS feature ID: 2586658

Waitsfield is a census-designated place (CDP) in the town of Waitsfield, Washington County, Vermont, United States. The population of the CDP was 164 at the 2010 census.

== Geography ==
According to the United States Census Bureau, the Waitsfield CDP has a total area of 0.40 square miles (1.03 km^{2}), of which 0.39 square miles (1.00 km^{2}) is land and 0.015 square miles (0.04 km^{2}), or 3.72%, is water. The village is located along the Mad River and Vermont Route 100, 1.1 miles (1.8 km) north of the neighboring village of Irasville, 6 miles (10 km) north of Warren, and 12 miles (19 km) south of Waterbury.

== Education ==
It is in the Harwood Unified Union School District. The district's comprehensive high school is Harwood Union Middle and High School.
