= East Montpelier, Vermont =

- Town
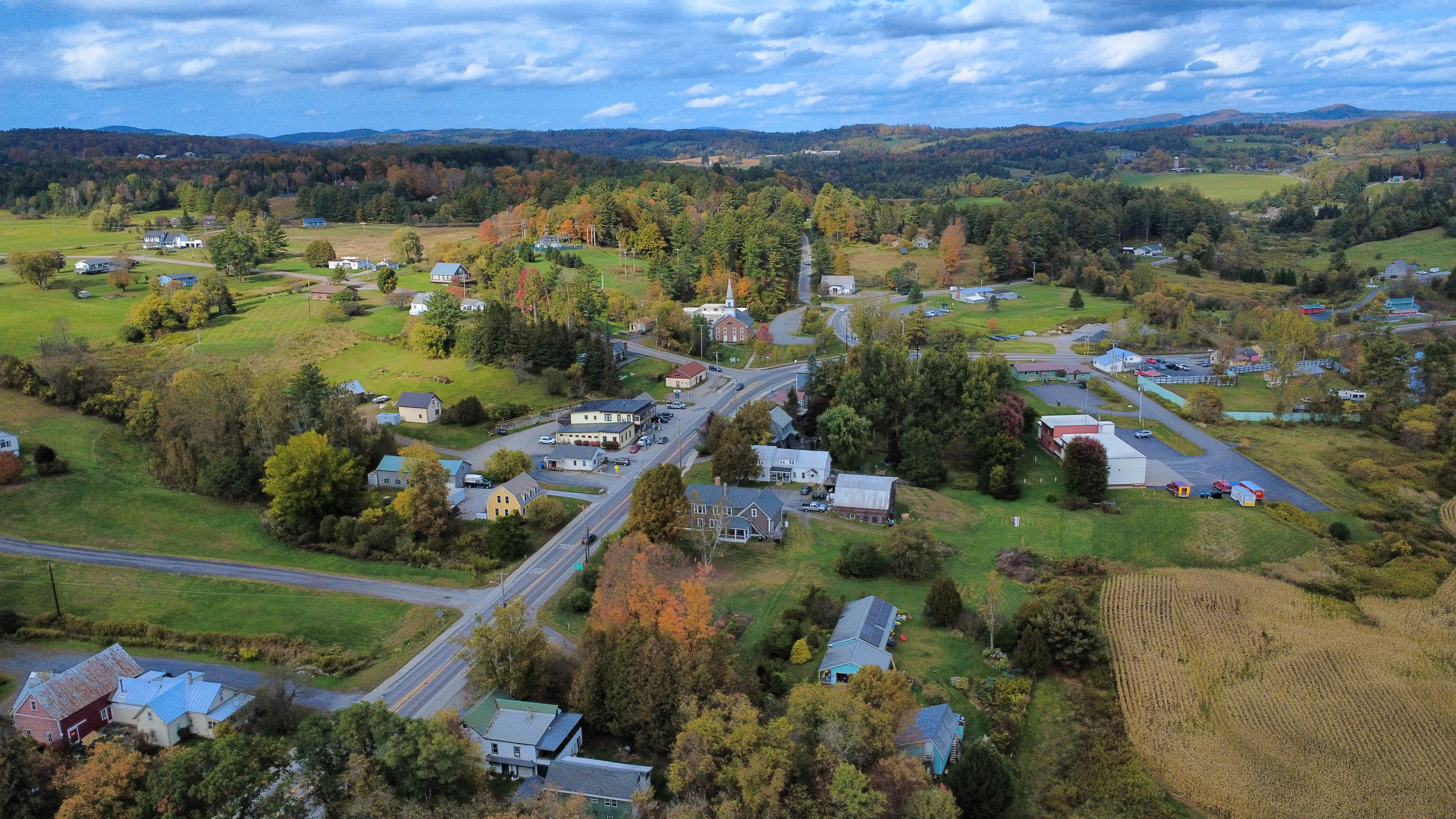
- East Montpelier, VT, from the southwest

- Location in Washington County and the state of Vermont
- Coordinates: 44°16′12″N 72°29′11″W
- Country: United States
- State: Vermont
- County: Washington
- Communities: East Montpelier; East Montpelier Center; North Montpelier

Area
  - Total: 32.1 sq mi (83.2 km^{2})
  - Land: 31.9 sq mi (82.5 km^{2})
  - Water: 0.27 sq mi (0.7 km^{2})
- Elevation: 1,102 ft (336 m)

Population (2020)
  - Total: 2,598
  - Density: 81.6/sq mi (31.5/km^{2})
- Time zone: UTC-5 (Eastern (EST))
  - Summer (DST): UTC-4 (EDT)
- ZIP Codes: 05651 (East Montpelier); 05602 (Montpelier); 05667 (Plainfield)
- Area code: 802
- FIPS code: 50-21925
- GNIS feature ID: 1462087
- Website: eastmontpeliervt.org

East Montpelier (/mɒntˈpiːliər/) is a town in Washington County, Vermont, United States. The population was 2,598 at the 2020 census.

== History ==
East Montpelier became a town in 1859.

== Geography ==
According to the United States Census Bureau, the town has a total area of 32.1 square miles (83.1 km^{2}), of which 32.0 square miles (82.9 km^{2}) is land and 0.1 square mile (0.3 km^{2}) (0.34%) is water.

The town is bordered by Montpelier, the state capital, to the southwest, by Middlesex to the northwest, by Calais to the northeast, by Marshfield to the east, by Plainfield to the southeast, and by the city of Barre to the south. The town of Worcester touches the northern corner of East Montpelier at a single point.

Villages in the town include East Montpelier (the primary settlement), East Montpelier Center, North Montpelier, and a portion of Adamant.

== Demographics ==
Historical population
Census	Pop.	Note	%±
1830	1,156		—
1840	1,092		−5.5%
1850	1,447		32.5%
1860	1,328		−8.2%
1870	1,130		−14.9%
1880	972		−14.0%
1890	953		−2.0%
1900	1,061		11.3%
1910	985		−7.2%
1920	918		−6.8%
1930	965		5.1%
1940	1,025		6.2%
1950	1,128		10.0%
1960	1,200		6.4%
1970	1,597		33.1%
1980	2,205		38.1%
1990	2,239		1.5%
2000	2,578		15.1%
2010	2,576		−0.1%
2020	2,598		0.9%
U.S. Decennial Census

At the 2000 census, there were 2,578 people, 1,007 households and 730 families residing in the town. The population density was 80.6 per square mile (31.1/km^{2}). There were 1,055 housing units at an average density of 33.0 per square mile (12.7/km^{2}). The racial makeup of the town was 96.39% White, 0.78% African American, 0.70% Native American, 0.39% Asian, 0.04% Pacific Islander, 0.04% from other races, and 1.67% from two or more races. Hispanic or Latino of any race were 1.12% of the population.

There were 1,007 households, of which 31.8% had children under the age of 18 living with them, 60.7% were couples living together and joined in either marriage or civil union, 8.4% had a female householder with no husband present, and 27.5% were non-families. 20.1% of all households were made up of individuals, and 6.8% had someone living alone who was 65 years of age or older. The average household size was 2.56 and the average family size was 2.96.

Age distribution was 24.3% under the age of 18, 6.3% from 18 to 24, 26.3% from 25 to 44, 32.1% from 45 to 64, and 11.0% who were 65 years of age or older. The median age was 41 years. For every 100 females, there were 98.3 males. For every 100 females age 18 and over, there were 96.7 males.

== Economy ==
=== Personal income ===
The median household income was $46,469, and the median family income was $53,922. Males had a median income of $36,023 versus $26,216 for females. The per capita income for the town was $22,425. About 2.3% of families and 3.6% of the population were below the poverty line, including 3.6% of those under age 18 and 5.0% of those age 65 or over.

=== Industry ===
East Montpelier is home to the Washington Electric Cooperative, which serves over 10,500 members. Its service area covers parts of 41 cities in north-central Vermont, in the counties of Washington, Orange, Caledonia and Orleans.

The town is served by the C.P. Dudley general store as well as Fox Market, which offers hot food service, a bar, and a selection of local and gourmet foods.

== Education ==
The school district is Washington Central Supervisory Union.

A portion of the Goddard College property was in East Montpelier.

== Notable people ==
- Jeff Danziger, political cartoonist and author
- Clarence H. Pitkin, U.S. Attorney for Vermont and Washington County State's Attorney. Born in East Montpelier
- Liz Stephen, cross country skier
