= Waitsfield Common Historic District =

Historic district in Vermont, United States

- U.S. National Register of Historic Places
- U.S. Historic district
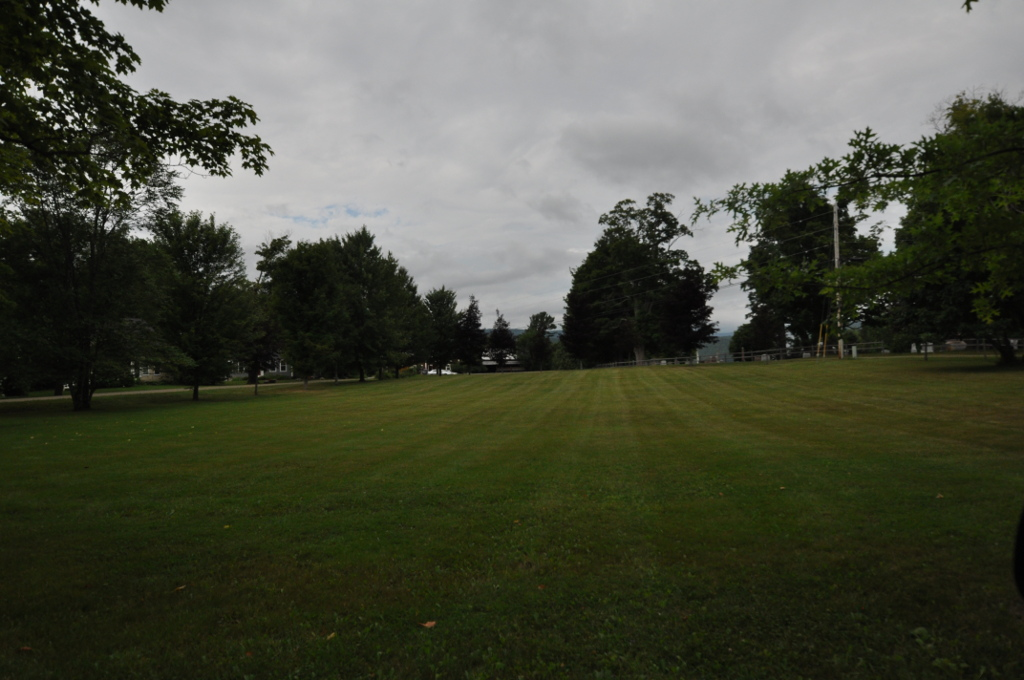

- Location within Vermont Location within the United States
- Location: Joslin Hill Rd, North Rd., East Rd., and Common Rd., Waitsfield, Vermont
- Coordinates: 44°11′16″N 72°47′47″W
- Area: 237 acres (96 ha)
- Built: 1793
- Architectural style: Federal, Greek Revival, et al.
- NRHP reference No.: 01001227
- Added to NRHP: November 8, 2001

The Waitsfield Common Historic District encompasses the original town center settlement of Waitsfield, Vermont, at the junction of Joslin Hill, Common, East, and North Roads. Located about 1 mile (1.6 km) from the town's present main village and center, it was laid out in 1793, and includes the triangular town common, a cemetery, and a number of houses built mainly between 1793 and 1841. The district was listed on the National Register of Historic Places in 2001.

== Description and history ==
The Waitsfield Common area was first settled in the 1790s, its hilltop setting typical of a number of other Vermont communities. The common, originally rectangular and now two triangles, was laid out in 1798, and the cemetery on its north side was established by 1797. The town's first church was built on land now part of the cemetery, and was torn down in the 1870s. The center's location was not well suited to the needs of 19th-century commerce, and the present Waitsfield Village was by 1841 eclipsing the center in importance. It has remained an essentially rural agricultural village since then, although there has been some new construction in the late 20th century, as the area became more attractive to tourists and skiers.

The historic district is centered on the four-way intersection of Joslin Hill, Common, East, and North Roads. The two triangular sections of the common are set northeast and southwest of this junction, with the cemetery and former church site to the northwest. Historic houses line the southern part of the common, and old stone walls line some of the roads. The district has an acreage of 237 acres (96 ha), and includes open fields that descend to the west and south. There are seven historic houses in all, with a number of non-historic houses set in sympathetic scale and setback.

== See also ==
- National Register of Historic Places listings in Washington County, Vermont
