= Worcester (CDP), Vermont =

Census-designated place in Vermont, United States

Worcester, Vermont
- Census-designated place
- Location in Washington County and the state of Vermont
- Coordinates: 44°22′26″N 72°32′58″W
- Country: United States
- State: Vermont
- County: Washington

Area
  - Total: 0.066 sq mi (0.17 km^{2})
  - Land: 0.066 sq mi (0.17 km^{2})
  - Water: 0 sq mi (0 km^{2})
- Elevation: 768 ft (234 m)

Population (2010)
  - Total: 112
  - Density: 1,700/sq mi (660/km^{2})
- Time zone: UTC-5 (Eastern (EST))
  - Summer (DST): UTC-4 (EDT)
- ZIP code: 05682
- Area code: 802
- FIPS code: 50-86050
- GNIS feature ID: 2584795

Worcester is a census-designated place (CDP) that comprises the main village in the town of Worcester, Washington County, Vermont, United States. The population of the CDP was 112 at the 2010 census.

== Geography ==
According to the United States Census Bureau, the Worcester CDP has a total area of 0.077 square miles (0.2 km^{2}), all land. The village is located along the North Branch of the Winooski River and Vermont Route 12, 9 miles (14 km) north of Montpelier, the state capital, and 18 miles (29 km) south of Morrisville.
