= Union 32 High School =

Coordinates: 44.2447462°N 72.5264171°W

- East Montpelier, Vermont; United States

Information
- Rival: Harwood Union High School, Montpelier Highschool
- Newspaper: U-32 Chronicle
- Budget: $14,833,943

Union High School District No. 32, known as U-32 High School or U-32, is in East Montpelier, Vermont, United States. It is the regional reform high school for the central Vermont towns of Berlin, Calais, Middlesex, East Montpelier, and Worcester, and students from Orange, Washington, and Roxbury can choose to attend U-32 after middle school. It encompasses grades seven through twelve in a combined middle and senior high school.

== U32 Chronicle ==
The school paper is the U-32 Chronicle.

The paper is mostly read by the parents of students and by administrators, as well as non-authoring students.

It publishes articles written by students including opinion pieces and satire.

== Recognition ==
- Boys Track and Field won nine state championships from 2013-2018, 2021, 2022, and 2024.
- Boys Division II soccer state champions 2008. This was the third championship in four years.
- The U-32 Debate Team won state championship in 2011 and went to the National Debate Tournament
- The U-32 Girls Nordic Ski team - state championship 2008 - 2009. This title is the first in the school's history.
- The U-32 Girls Ice Hockey Team - state champions 2009-2010
- The U-32 Football team went undefeated in 2006, allowing less than 50 points all season and scoring more than 400. This year marked a record number of VT-NH Shrine Bowl participants for a single year coming from the school: Marcus Hass, Robert (Bob) Fitch, Silas Dowen, Todd Murphy, and Robert Keene
- U-32 sports are covered by the Zoo Sports Network, a platform dedicated entirely to Raider athletics.
- Boys Division II baseball state champions 2021.
- The U-32 Boys Cross Country Team won New Englands in 2021, the second team from Vermont to do so and the first from Vermont's Second division. They later went on to place 7th at NXN Nike Cross National Qualifiers for the Northeast region.

== Notable graduates ==
- Frank Miller - 1975 comic-book writer and artist Miller became a professional comic book artist while in his teens, working on a variety of assignments for major publishers, including Gold Key, DC and Marvel.
- Sydney Perry - Beauty queen holding the Miss Vermont Teen USA 2008 and Miss North Carolina USA 2012 titles.
- Owen Kellington - Professional baseball pitcher drafted by the Pittsburgh Pirates in round 4 of the 2021 MLB Draft.

== Principals ==
1. William Grady 1971-1972 (Grady resigned his position after serving one year of his two-year contract - resigned May 12, 1972)
2. James Dawson 1972-1976
3. Alan Weiss 1976-1979
4. Lyman Amsden 1979-1986
5. Paul Lissandrello 1986-1988
6. John Coolidge 1988-1996
7. Inga Duktig 1996-1999
8. David Royce 1999-2000 (Interim, pending Dorothy Blake's arrival)
9. Dorothy Blake 2000-2006
10. Keith Gerritt 2006-2014
11. Steve Dellinger-Pate 2014-2024
12. Dr. Rebecca Tatistcheff 2024–present

== Washington Central Supervisory Union (WCSU) Superintendents List ==
1. 1971-1973 Charles Johnson – our school districts combined with WNSU which was Cabot & Twinfield
2. 1973-1977 Robert Grogan (WCSU formed in 1973)
3. 1977-1980 Robert Arlin
4. 1981-1983 Alice Angney, Acting Superintendent
5. 1983-1986 Alice Angney
6. 1986-1991 Lyman Amsden
7. 1991-1994 George Olive
8. 1995-1997 Philip Hyjek, (Transitional Leadership Compact - UVM)
9. 1997-2012 Robbe Brook
10. 2012-2019 William Kimball
11. 2019-2020 Debra Taylor, Interim Superintendent
12. 2020-2021 Bryan Olkowski
13. 2021-2022 Jennifer Miller-Arsenault, Interim Superintendent
14. 2022-2024 Meagan Roy
15. 2024–Present Steven Dellinger-Pate
