= Waitsfield, Vermont =

- Town
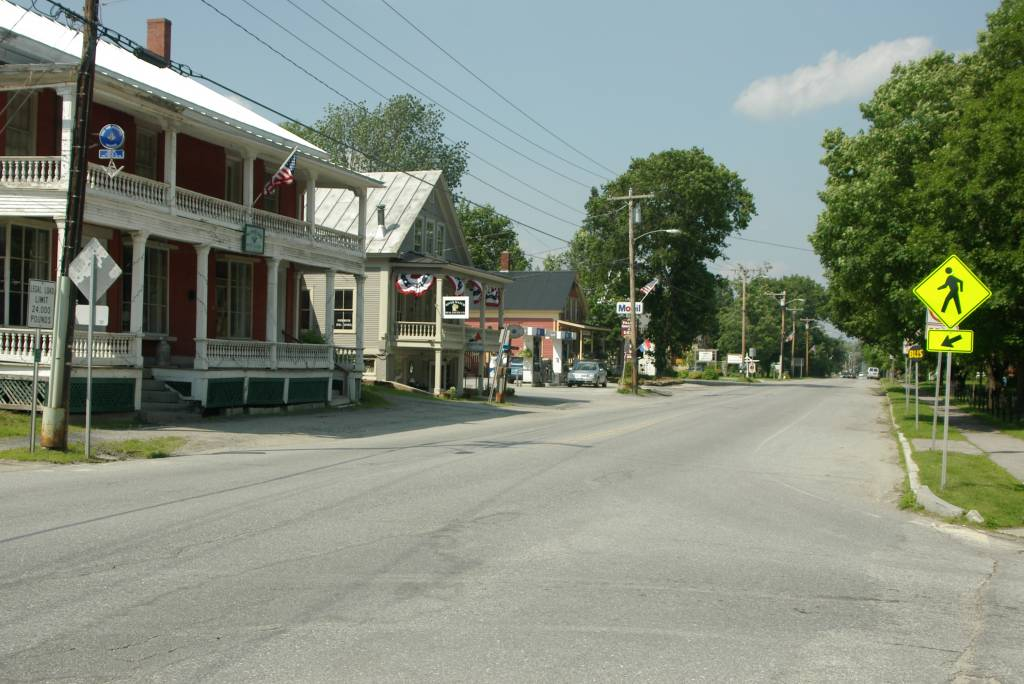
- Downtown Waitsfield, Vermont

- Seal

- Location in Washington County and the state of Vermont
- Coordinates: 44°11′33″N 72°45′52″W
- Country: United States
- State: Vermont
- County: Washington
- Chartered: 1782 (Vermont)
- Communities: Waitsfield; Waitsfield Common; Irasville

Area
  - Total: 26.9 sq mi (69.7 km^{2})
  - Land: 26.7 sq mi (69.2 km^{2})
  - Water: 0.19 sq mi (0.5 km^{2})
- Elevation: 994 ft (303 m)

Population (2020)
  - Total: 1,844
  - Density: 69.0/sq mi (26.6/km^{2})
- Time zone: UTC-5 (EST)
  - Summer (DST): UTC-4 (EDT)
- ZIP Codes: 05673; 05660 (Moretown)
- Area code: 802
- FIPS code: 50-75325
- GNIS feature ID: 1462237
- Website: www.waitsfieldvt.gov

Waitsfield is a town in Washington County, Vermont, United States. The population was 1,844 as of the 2020 census. It was created by a Vermont charter on February 25, 1782, and was granted to militia Generals Benjamin Wait, Roger Enos and others. The town was named after Wait.

== Geography ==
According to the United States Census Bureau, the town has a total area of 26.9 square miles (69.7 km^{2}), of which 26.7 square miles (69.2 km^{2}) is land and 0.19 square miles (0.5 km^{2}), or 0.68%, is water.

Waitsfield is located in the valley of the Mad River, between the main range of the Green Mountains to the west and the Northfield Mountains to the east. Vermont Route 100 runs through the valley, connecting Waterbury to the north, with Warren and Rochester to the south. Vermont Route 17 leaves Route 100 to the west, heading over the Green Mountains past the Mad River Glen ski area, eventually reaching Bristol.

The primary villages in town are Waitsfield and Irasville, located along Route 100. Waitsfield Common is near the geographic center of the town.

=== Climate ===
Climate data for Waitsfield, Vermont, 1991–2020 normals: 1142ft (348m)
Month	Jan	Feb	Mar	Apr	May	Jun	Jul	Aug	Sep	Oct	Nov	Dec	Year
Mean daily maximum °F (°C)	27.6 (−2.4)	30.2 (−1.0)	37.7 (3.2)	51.1 (10.6)	64.0 (17.8)	72.3 (22.4)	77.2 (25.1)	75.7 (24.3)	68.8 (20.4)	55.0 (12.8)	44.0 (6.7)	33.3 (0.7)	53.1 (11.7)
Daily mean °F (°C)	18.9 (−7.3)	20.9 (−6.2)	28.4 (−2.0)	41.0 (5.0)	53.3 (11.8)	61.8 (16.6)	66.4 (19.1)	64.9 (18.3)	57.6 (14.2)	45.7 (7.6)	35.7 (2.1)	25.6 (−3.6)	43.4 (6.3)
Mean daily minimum °F (°C)	10.2 (−12.1)	11.5 (−11.4)	19.1 (−7.2)	30.9 (−0.6)	42.5 (5.8)	51.3 (10.7)	55.6 (13.1)	54.1 (12.3)	46.3 (7.9)	36.3 (2.4)	27.3 (−2.6)	17.9 (−7.8)	33.6 (0.9)
Average precipitation inches (mm)	3.41 (87)	3.01 (76)	3.53 (90)	3.63 (92)	4.35 (110)	4.57 (116)	5.24 (133)	4.71 (120)	4.38 (111)	5.42 (138)	3.56 (90)	4.41 (112)	50.22 (1,275)
Average snowfall inches (cm)	26.90 (68.3)	27.20 (69.1)	25.00 (63.5)	6.10 (15.5)	0.00 (0.00)	0.00 (0.00)	0.00 (0.00)	0.00 (0.00)	0.00 (0.00)	0.90 (2.3)	7.00 (17.8)	24.60 (62.5)	117.7 (299)
Source 1: NOAA
Source 2: NOAA (Waitsfield 2 W precipitation & snowfall)

== Demographics ==
Historical population
Census	Pop.	Note	%±
1790	61		—
1800	473		675.4%
1810	647		36.8%
1820	935		44.5%
1830	968		3.5%
1840	1,048		8.3%
1850	1,021		−2.6%
1860	1,005		−1.6%
1870	948		−5.7%
1880	938		−1.1%
1890	815		−13.1%
1900	760		−6.7%
1910	709		−6.7%
1920	682		−3.8%
1930	723		6.0%
1940	706		−2.4%
1950	661		−6.4%
1960	658		−0.5%
1970	837		27.2%
1980	1,300		55.3%
1990	1,422		9.4%
2000	1,659		16.7%
2010	1,719		3.6%
2020	1,844		7.3%
U.S. Decennial Census

The 2000 census stated that there were 1,659 people, 734 households, and 485 families residing in the town. The population density was 61.7 people per square mile (23.8/km^{2}). There were 908 housing units at an average density of 33.7 per square mile (13.0/km^{2}). The racial makeup of the town was 97.23% White, 0.96% African American, 0.24% Native American, 0.48% Asian, 0.06% Pacific Islander, 0.30% from other races, and 0.72% from two or more races. Hispanic or Latino of any race were 1.21% of the population.

There were 734 households, out of which 29.4% had children under the age of 18 living with them, 55.2% were married couples living together, 8.2% had a female householder with no husband present, and 33.9% were non-families. 25.5% of all households were made up of individuals, and 6.5% had someone living alone who was 65 years of age or older. The average household size was 2.26 and the average family size was 2.73.

In the town, the population was spread out, with 21.3% under the age of 18, 6.6% from 18 to 24, 32.2% from 25 to 44, 27.7% from 45 to 64, and 12.2% who were 65 years of age or older. The median age was 40 years. For every 100 females, there were 96.3 males. For every 100 females age 18 and over, there were 97.3 males.

The median income for a household in the town was $45,577, and the median income for a family was $54,868. Males had a median income of $31,827 versus $27,260 for females. The per capita income for the town was $24,209. About 3.9% of families and 5.9% of the population were below the poverty line, including 7.1% of those under age 18 and 2.0% of those age 65 or over.

== Education ==
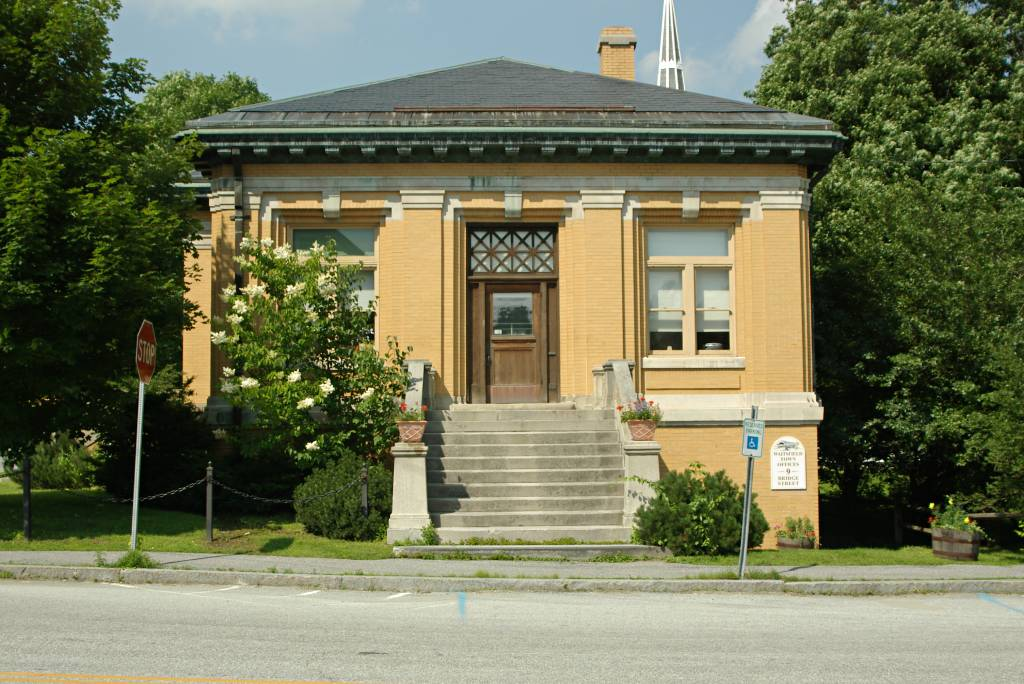
Library and old Town Office – Waitsfield, Vermont

It is in the Harwood Unified Union School District. Children in Waitsfield attend Waitsfield Elementary School and Harwood Union Middle and High School.

== Notable people ==
- Ralph Ellison, American author
- Bill Parker, artist and inventor
- Grace Potter, musician of Grace Potter and the Nocturnals
- Edmund Rice, US congressman from Minnesota
- Henry Mower Rice, US senator from Minnesota
- Charles W. Waterman, US senator from Colorado
- Shaina Taub, Tony Awards winner

== Economy ==
The town's economy is largely supported by two nearby ski resorts, Sugarbush Resort and Mad River Glen. Waitsfield is also home to several restaurants and lodging establishments.

A long-running Christmas-themed commercial for Miller High Life beer was filmed in Waitsfield in 1976.
