= Ilari Melart =

Finnish ice hockey player

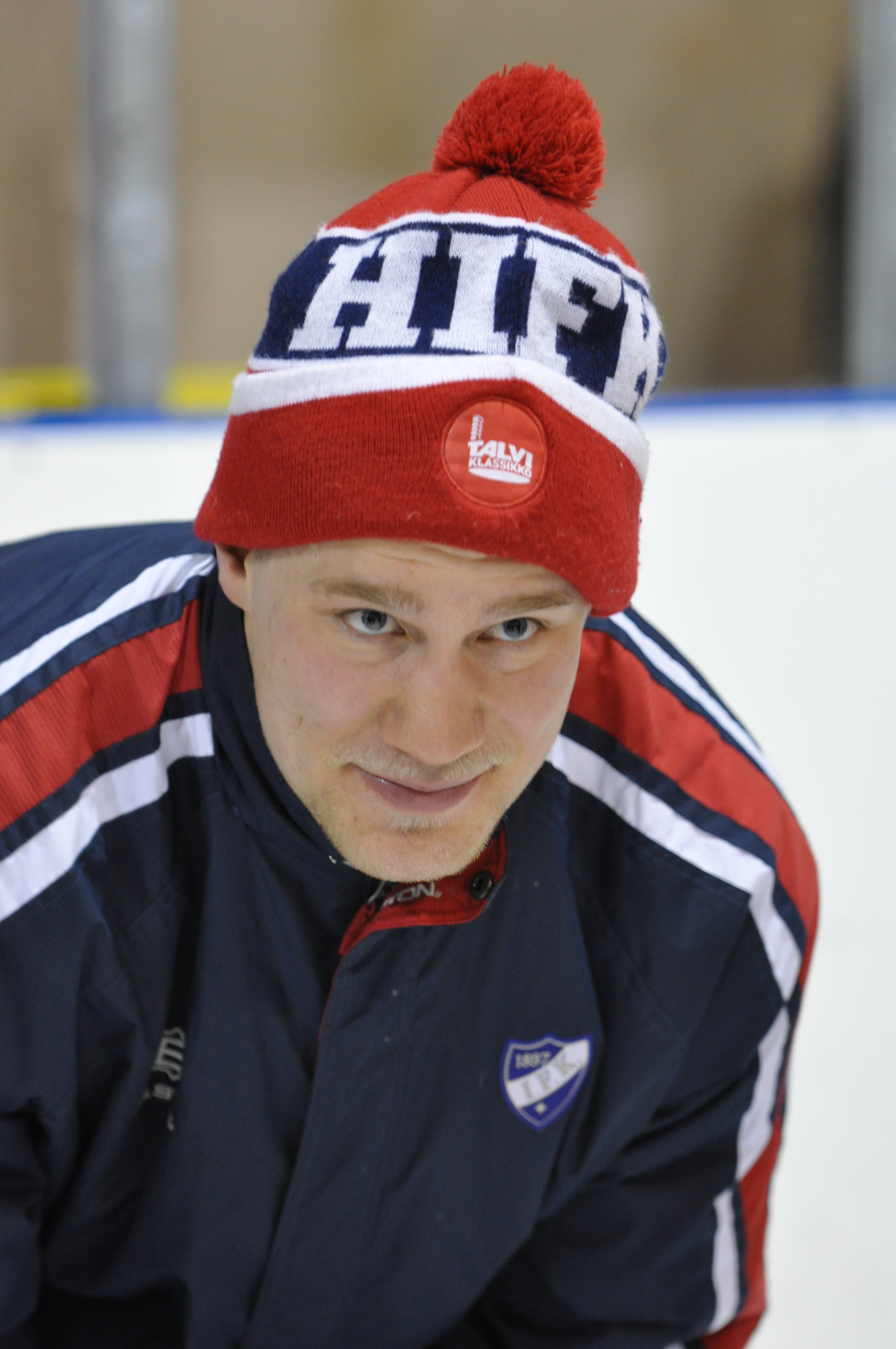
- Born: February 11, 1989 (age 37) Helsinki, Finland
- Height: 6 ft 3 in (191 cm)
- Weight: 227 lb (103 kg; 16 st 3 lb)
- Position: Defense
- Shoots: Left
- Liiga team Former teams: HIFK; Springfield Falcons; HC Yugra; Luleå HF; Färjestad BK; Växjö Lakers; Adler Mannheim
- National team: Finland
- NHL draft: Undrafted
- Playing career: 2008–present

Ilari Melart (born February 11, 1989) is a Finnish professional ice hockey defenceman currently playing for HIFK of the Liiga.

== Playing career ==
In 2006–07 he played 10 matches for the A-junior (top youth level in Finland) side and an additional 21 matches for the B-juniors. In 2007-08 he made 21 appearances for the A-juniors, which eventually earned him a spot in the first team. The year before Melart played in the United States for Harwood Union High School in Duxbury, Vermont.

Melart made his first appearance for HIFK's first team on November 13, 2008, away against Tappara. Before joining the first team, Melart played with HIFK's different youth teams.

On May 24, 2013, Melart signed as a free agent with the Columbus Blue Jackets on a one-year entry-level contract. Melart moved to North America for the 2013–14 season and was assigned to the Blue Jackets' AHL team, the Springfield Falcons. He scored his first professional goal on November 23 against the Hartford Wolf Pack. After 24 games with the Falcons, and unable to solidify a position on the blueline, Melart opted to be reassigned to the Russian Kontinental Hockey League to play for Yugra Khanty-Mansiysk. In 15 games he scored 1 goal and 5 points as Yugra were unable to qualify for the Gagarin Cup. He then returned to the Falcons on March 25, 2013, to fulfil his contract.

As a restricted free agent with the Blue Jackets, Melart opted to make a permanent return with Yugra of the KHL on May 19, 2014.

== Career statistics ==
=== Regular season and playoffs ===
			Regular season					Playoffs
Season	Team	League	GP	G	A	Pts	PIM	GP	G	A	Pts	PIM
2008–09	HIFK	SM-l	27	1	1	2	62	—	—	—	—	—
2009–10	HIFK	SM-l	13	1	0	1	47	2	0	0	0	0
2010–11	HIFK	SM-l	20	1	1	2	94	6	0	1	1	2
2011–12	HIFK	SM-l	36	2	3	5	132	2	1	0	1	0
2012–13	HIFK	SM-l	50	7	11	18	80	7	0	0	0	29
2013–14	Springfield Falcons	AHL	31	1	2	3	30	1	0	0	0	0
2013–14	Yugra Khanty-Mansiysk	KHL	15	1	4	5	22	—	—	—	—	—
2014–15	Yugra Khanty-Mansiysk	KHL	33	5	1	6	38	—	—	—	—	—
2015–16	Luleå HF	SHL	48	4	7	11	79	11	1	0	1	14
2016–17	Luleå HF	SHL	47	6	10	16	32	2	0	0	0	0
2017–18	Färjestad BK	SHL	46	4	5	9	94	6	1	0	1	10
2018–19	Färjestad BK	SHL	40	2	10	12	30	14	2	2	4	14
2019–20	Växjö Lakers	SHL	44	12	9	21	77	—	—	—	—	—
2020–21	Växjö Lakers	SHL	38	12	6	18	67	9	1	2	3	39
2021–22	Adler Mannheim	DEL	23	2	13	15	47	3	0	1	1	8
2022–23	HIFK	Liiga	59	7	16	23	73	7	1	4	5	31
2023–24	HIFK	Liiga	40	3	6	9	45	—	—	—	—	—
2024–25	HIFK	Liiga	40	4	6	10	92	4	0	1	1	4
Liiga totals			285	26	44	70	625	28	2	6	8	66
KHL totals			48	6	5	11	60	—	—	—	—	—
SHL totals			263	40	47	87	379	42	5	4	9	77
DEL totals			23	2	13	15	47	3	0	1	1	8

=== International ===
Year	Team	Event	Result	GP	G	A	Pts	PIM
2009	Finland	WJC	7th	6	0	1	1	4
2013	Finland	WC	4th	10	0	0	0	10
Junior totals				6	0	1	1	4
Senior totals				10	0	0	0	10
