= Washington County, Vermont =

County in Vermont, United States

- County
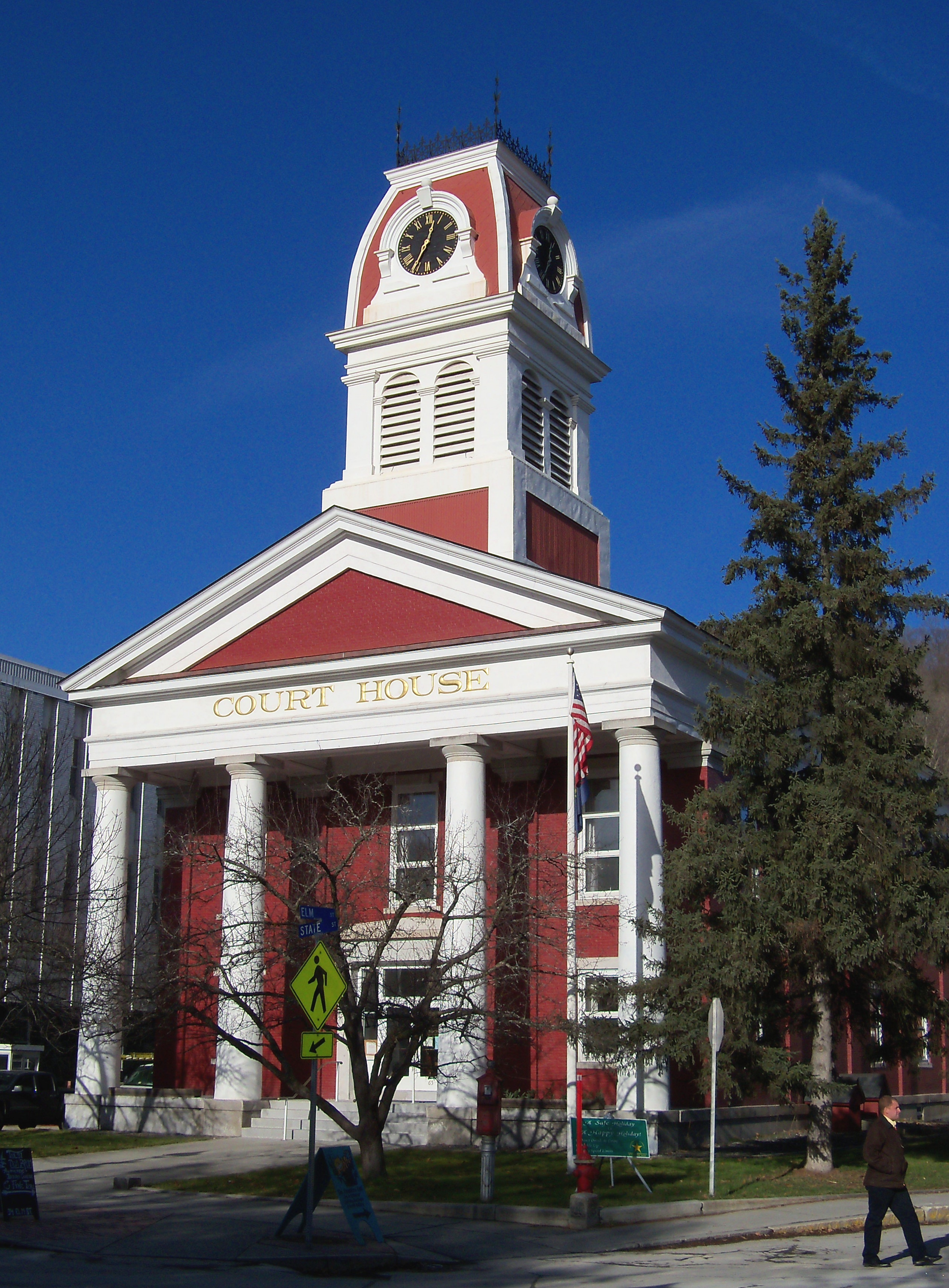
- Washington County Courthouse

- Location within the U.S. state of Vermont
- Coordinates: 44°14′57″N 72°34′51″W
- Country: United States
- State: Vermont
- Founded: 1811
- Named for: George Washington
- Shire Town: Montpelier
- Largest city: Barre

Area
  - Total: 695 sq mi (1,800 km^{2})
  - Land: 687 sq mi (1,780 km^{2})
  - Water: 8.2 sq mi (21 km^{2}) 1.2%

Population (2020)
  - Total: 59,807
  - Estimate (2025): 59,652 ▼
  - Density: 86/sq mi (33/km^{2})
- Time zone: UTC−5 (Eastern)
  - Summer (DST): UTC−4 (EDT)
- Congressional district: At-large

Washington County is a county located in the U.S. state of Vermont. Named after George Washington, its county seat is the city of Montpelier (the least populous state capital in the United States) and the most populous city is the city of Barre. As of the 2020 census, the population was 59,807, making it the third-most populous county in Vermont, but the third-least populous capital county in the United States after Hughes County, South Dakota and Franklin County, Kentucky; in 2023, the estimated population was 60,142. Washington County comprises the Barre, Vermont micropolitan statistical area. In 2010, the center of population of Vermont was located in Washington County, in the town of Warren.

== History ==
Washington County is one of several Vermont counties created from land ceded by the state of New York on January 15, 1777, when Vermont declared itself to be a distinct state from New York. The land originally was contested by Massachusetts, New Hampshire, and New Netherland, but it remained undelineated until July 20, 1764, when King George III established the boundary between New Hampshire and New York along the west bank of the Connecticut River, north of Massachusetts and south of the parallel of 45 degrees north latitude. New York assigned the land gained to Albany County. On March 12, 1772, Albany County was partitioned to create Charlotte County, and this situation remained until Vermont's independence from New York and Britain.

Washington County was originally established as Jefferson County in 1810 from parts of Caledonia County, Chittenden County, and Orange County and organized the following year.

In 1814 it was renamed to Washington County. The name change occurred after the Federalists took control of the Vermont Legislature from the Jeffersonians. Vermont which conducted significant trade with British Canada had suffered particularly by passage of the Embargo Act of 1807 during the Jefferson administration.

== Geography ==
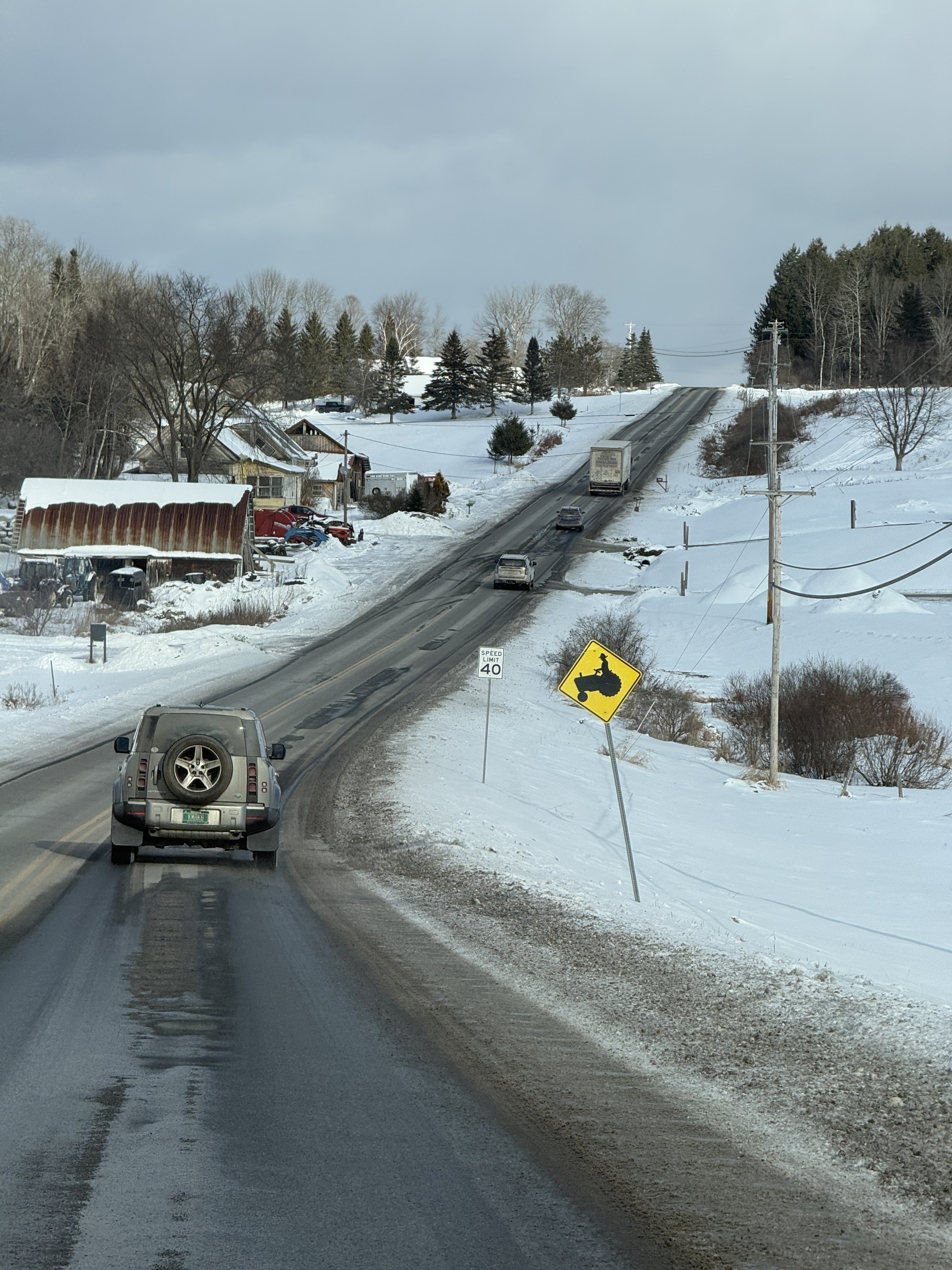
Towne Hille Road in East Montpelier

According to the U.S. Census Bureau, the county has a total area of 695 square miles (1,800 km^{2}), of which 687 square miles (1,780 km^{2}) is land and 8.2 square miles (21 km^{2}) (1.2%) is water.

=== Major highways ===
- Interstate 89

=== Adjacent counties ===
- Lamoille County – north
- Caledonia County – northeast
- Orange County – southeast
- Addison County – southwest
- Chittenden County – northwest

=== National protected area ===
- Green Mountain National Forest (part)

== Demographics ==
Historical population
| Census | Pop. | Note | %± |
|---|---|---|---|
| 1820 | 14,113 | | — |
| 1830 | 21,378 | | 51.5% |
| 1840 | 23,506 | | 10.0% |
| 1850 | 24,654 | | 4.9% |
| 1860 | 27,612 | | 12.0% |
| 1870 | 26,520 | | −4.0% |
| 1880 | 25,404 | | −4.2% |
| 1890 | 29,606 | | 16.5% |
| 1900 | 36,607 | | 23.6% |
| 1910 | 41,702 | | 13.9% |
| 1920 | 38,921 | | −6.7% |
| 1930 | 41,733 | | 7.2% |
| 1940 | 41,546 | | −0.4% |
| 1950 | 42,870 | | 3.2% |
| 1960 | 42,860 | | 0.0% |
| 1970 | 47,659 | | 11.2% |
| 1980 | 52,393 | | 9.9% |
| 1990 | 54,928 | | 4.8% |
| 2000 | 58,039 | | 5.7% |
| 2010 | 59,534 | | 2.6% |
| 2020 | 59,807 | | 0.5% |
| 2025 (est.) | 59,652 | ▼ | −0.3% |
U.S. Decennial Census; 1790–1960 1900–1990; 1990–2000 2010–2018

=== 2020 census ===
As of the 2020 census, the county had a population of 59,807. Of the residents, 18.5% were under the age of 18 and 20.9% were 65 years of age or older; the median age was 44.2 years. For every 100 females there were 98.2 males, and for every 100 females age 18 and over there were 96.5 males.

The racial makeup of the county was 90.5% White, 1.1% Black or African American, 0.3% American Indian and Alaska Native, 1.1% Asian, 0.8% from some other race, and 6.2% from two or more races. Hispanic or Latino residents of any race comprised 2.6% of the population.

There were 25,842 households in the county, of which 25.0% had children under the age of 18 living with them and 26.5% had a female householder with no spouse or partner present. About 31.9% of all households were made up of individuals and 13.5% had someone living alone who was 65 years of age or older.

There were 30,645 housing units, of which 15.7% were vacant. Among occupied housing units, 70.3% were owner-occupied and 29.7% were renter-occupied. The homeowner vacancy rate was 1.3% and the rental vacancy rate was 6.2%.

Washington County, Vermont – Racial and ethnic composition Note: the US Census treats Hispanic/Latino as an ethnic category. This table excludes Latinos from the racial categories and assigns them to a separate category. Hispanics/Latinos may be of any race.
| Race / Ethnicity (NH = Non-Hispanic) | Pop 2000 | Pop 2010 | Pop 2020 | % 2000 | % 2010 | % 2020 |
|---|---|---|---|---|---|---|
| White alone (NH) | 55,778 | 56,473 | 53,704 | 96.10% | 94.85% | 89.79% |
| Black or African American alone (NH) | 261 | 411 | 612 | 0.44% | 0.69% | 1.02% |
| Native American or Alaska Native alone (NH) | 158 | 126 | 135 | 0.27% | 0.21% | 0.22% |
| Asian alone (NH) | 327 | 495 | 632 | 0.56% | 0.83% | 1.05% |
| Pacific Islander alone (NH) | 7 | 11 | 23 | 0.01% | 0.01% | 0.03% |
| Other race alone (NH) | 61 | 56 | 319 | 0.10% | 0.09% | 0.53% |
| Mixed race or Multiracial (NH) | 715 | 967 | 2,813 | 1.23% | 1.62% | 4.70% |
| Hispanic or Latino (any race) | 732 | 894 | 1,569 | 1.26% | 1.50% | 2.62% |
| Total | 58,039 | 59,534 | 59,807 | 100.00% | 100.00% | 100.00% |

=== 2010 census ===
As of the 2010 United States census, there were 59,534 people, 25,027 households, and 15,410 families residing in the county. The population density was 86.6 inhabitants per square mile (33.4/km^{2}). There were 29,941 housing units at an average density of 43.6 per square mile (16.8/km^{2}).

Of the 25,027 households, 28.2% had children under the age of 18 living with them, 47.1% were married couples living together, 10.0% had a female householder with no husband present, 38.4% were non-families, and 29.7% of all households were made up of individuals. The average household size was 2.28 and the average family size was 2.81. The median age was 42.3 years.

The median income for a household in the county was $55,313 and the median income for a family was $66,968. Males had a median income of $45,579 versus $38,052 for females. The per capita income for the county was $28,337. About 5.9% of families and 10.5% of the population were below the poverty line, including 13.8% of those under age 18 and 7.5% of those age 65 or over.

== Elections ==
In 1828, Washington County was won by National Republican Party candidate John Quincy Adams.

In 1832, the county was won by Democratic Party incumbent president Andrew Jackson. Democratic Martin Van Buren was also able to win the county in 1836.

In 1840, the county was won by Whig Party candidate William Henry Harrison.

In 1844, the county was won by Democratic candidate James K. Polk. Democratic candidate Lewis Cass was also able to win the county in 1848.

In 1852, Whig Party candidate Winfield Scott won the county.

From John C. Frémont in 1856 to Richard Nixon in 1960, the Republican Party would have a 104-year winning streak within Washington County.

In 1964, the county was won by Democratic Party incumbent President Lyndon B. Johnson.

Following the Democrats' victory in 1964, the county went back to voting for Republican candidates for another 20 year winning streak starting with Richard Nixon in 1968 and ending with George H. W. Bush in 1988, who became the last Republican presidential candidate to win the county.

In 1992, the county was won by Bill Clinton and has been won by Democratic candidates ever since.

United States presidential election results for Washington County, Vermont
| Year | Republican | | Democratic | | Third party(ies) | |
| Year | No. | % | No. | % | No. | % |
|---|---|---|---|---|---|---|
| 1880 | 3,611 | 62.67% | 1,927 | 33.44% | 224 | 3.89% |
| 1884 | 3,129 | 60.00% | 1,812 | 34.75% | 274 | 5.25% |
| 1888 | 3,715 | 64.70% | 1,892 | 32.95% | 135 | 2.35% |
| 1892 | 3,134 | 60.28% | 1,940 | 37.31% | 125 | 2.40% |
| 1896 | 4,476 | 73.10% | 1,396 | 22.80% | 251 | 4.10% |
| 1900 | 3,819 | 68.94% | 1,622 | 29.28% | 99 | 1.79% |
| 1904 | 3,807 | 72.07% | 1,247 | 23.61% | 228 | 4.32% |
| 1908 | 3,823 | 67.86% | 1,610 | 28.58% | 201 | 3.57% |
| 1912 | 2,797 | 41.26% | 1,743 | 25.71% | 2,239 | 33.03% |
| 1916 | 4,216 | 57.11% | 2,732 | 37.01% | 434 | 5.88% |
| 1920 | 6,418 | 75.76% | 1,953 | 23.06% | 100 | 1.18% |
| 1924 | 8,525 | 74.30% | 1,715 | 14.95% | 1,234 | 10.75% |
| 1928 | 9,891 | 68.91% | 4,408 | 30.71% | 54 | 0.38% |
| 1932 | 8,393 | 57.72% | 5,777 | 39.73% | 370 | 2.54% |
| 1936 | 8,351 | 50.64% | 8,073 | 48.96% | 66 | 0.40% |
| 1940 | 8,426 | 52.00% | 7,727 | 47.69% | 50 | 0.31% |
| 1944 | 7,162 | 55.47% | 5,749 | 44.53% | 0 | 0.00% |
| 1948 | 7,720 | 59.92% | 4,839 | 37.56% | 324 | 2.51% |
| 1952 | 11,979 | 72.59% | 4,460 | 27.03% | 64 | 0.39% |
| 1956 | 11,351 | 71.50% | 4,520 | 28.47% | 5 | 0.03% |
| 1960 | 10,458 | 59.49% | 7,116 | 40.48% | 4 | 0.02% |
| 1964 | 5,750 | 32.37% | 12,002 | 67.57% | 11 | 0.06% |
| 1968 | 9,387 | 52.62% | 7,826 | 43.87% | 626 | 3.51% |
| 1972 | 12,421 | 61.58% | 7,596 | 37.66% | 152 | 0.75% |
| 1976 | 10,919 | 53.90% | 8,764 | 43.26% | 576 | 2.84% |
| 1980 | 9,714 | 41.96% | 9,559 | 41.29% | 3,878 | 16.75% |
| 1984 | 13,706 | 54.48% | 11,163 | 44.37% | 289 | 1.15% |
| 1988 | 13,253 | 50.40% | 12,690 | 48.26% | 351 | 1.33% |
| 1992 | 9,424 | 32.12% | 13,452 | 45.85% | 6,462 | 22.03% |
| 1996 | 7,750 | 29.94% | 14,267 | 55.12% | 3,867 | 14.94% |
| 2000 | 11,448 | 38.48% | 15,281 | 51.37% | 3,020 | 10.15% |
| 2004 | 11,461 | 36.44% | 19,177 | 60.98% | 810 | 2.58% |
| 2008 | 9,129 | 28.35% | 22,324 | 69.33% | 747 | 2.32% |
| 2012 | 8,093 | 27.61% | 20,351 | 69.44% | 863 | 2.94% |
| 2016 | 7,993 | 25.71% | 18,594 | 59.81% | 4,499 | 14.47% |
| 2020 | 8,928 | 25.29% | 25,191 | 71.35% | 1,188 | 3.36% |
| 2024 | 9,327 | 26.37% | 24,527 | 69.35% | 1,515 | 4.28% |

== Communities ==
=== Cities ===
- Barre
- Montpelier (shire town)

=== Towns ===
- Barre (Town)
- Berlin
- Cabot
- Calais
- Duxbury
- East Montpelier
- Fayston
- Marshfield
- Middlesex
- Moretown
- Northfield
- Plainfield
- Roxbury
- Waitsfield
- Warren
- Waterbury
- Woodbury
- Worcester

=== Village ===
- Marshfield

=== Census-designated places ===
- Cabot
- East Barre
- East Montpelier
- Graniteville
- Northfield
- Plainfield
- South Barre
- Waitsfield
- Waterbury
- Waterbury Center
- Websterville
- Worcester

=== Other unincorporated communities ===
- Adamant
- East Calais
- East Montpelier Center
- East Roxbury
- Irasville
- North Montpelier
- Putnamville
- Riverton
- South Northfield
- South Woodbury

== Education ==
School districts include:

- Barre Supervisory Union
- Caledonia Central Supervisory Union
- Central Vermont Supervisory Union
- Harwood Unified School District
- Montpelier-Roxbury Supervisory Union
- Orleans Southwest Supervisory Union
- Washington Central Supervisory Union

Previously there were many more school districts in the county. As of the 2010 U.S. Census, the K-12 districts were:

- Cabot School District
- Montpelier School District
- Northfield School District
- Twinfield Union School District 33

The secondary school districts were:

- Harwood Union High School District 19
- Hazen Union High School District 26
- Spaulding Union High School District 41
- Union High School District 32

The elementary school districts were:

- Barre City School District
- Barre Town School District
- Berlin School District
- Calais School District
- Duxbury/Waterbury Union School District 45
- East Montpelier School District
- Fayston School District
- Middlesex School District
- Moretown School District
- Roxbury School District
- Waitsfield School District
- Warren School District
- Woodbury School District
- Worcester School District

== See also ==
- List of counties in Vermont
- List of towns in Vermont
- National Register of Historic Places listings in Washington County, Vermont
