= Small nucleolar RNA SNORD32 =

Non-coding RNA molecule

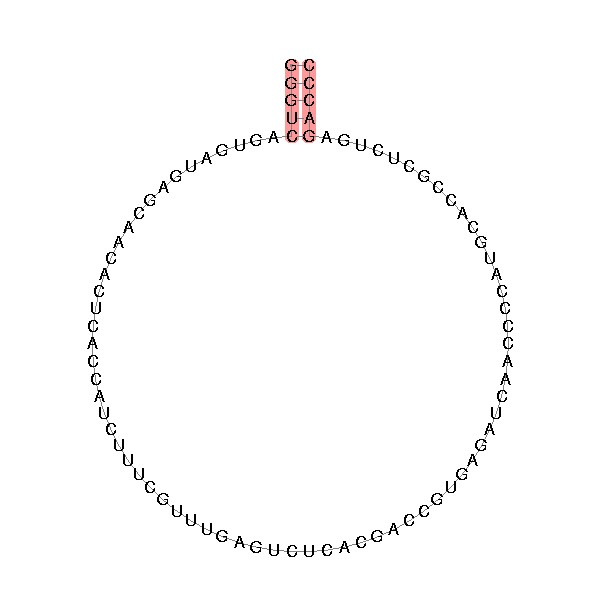

Identifiers
- Symbol: SNORD32
- Rfam: RF00219

Other data
- RNA type: Gene; snRNA; guide; CD-box;
- PDB structures: PDBe

In molecular biology, snoRNA U32 (also known as SNORD32) is a non-coding RNA (ncRNA) molecule which functions in the modification of other small nuclear RNAs (snRNAs). This type of modifying RNA is usually located in the nucleolus of the eukaryotic cell which is a major site of snRNA biogenesis. It is known as a small nucleolar RNA (snoRNA) and also often referred to as a guide RNA.

snoRNA U32 belongs to the C/D box class of snoRNAs which contain the conserved sequence motifs known as the C box (UGAUGA) and the D box (CUGA). Most of the members of the box C/D family function in directing site-specific 2'-O-methylation of substrate RNAs.

U32 is encoded within intron 2 of the ribosomal protein L13 gene in human and mouse and is predicted to guide the 2'O-ribose methylation of both 18S ribosomal RNA (rRNA) residue G1328 and 28S rRNA residue A1511. U32A share the same host gene with the C/D box snoRNAs U33, U34 and U35A (RPL13A).
