= Marshfield (village), Vermont =

Marshfield, Vermont
- Village
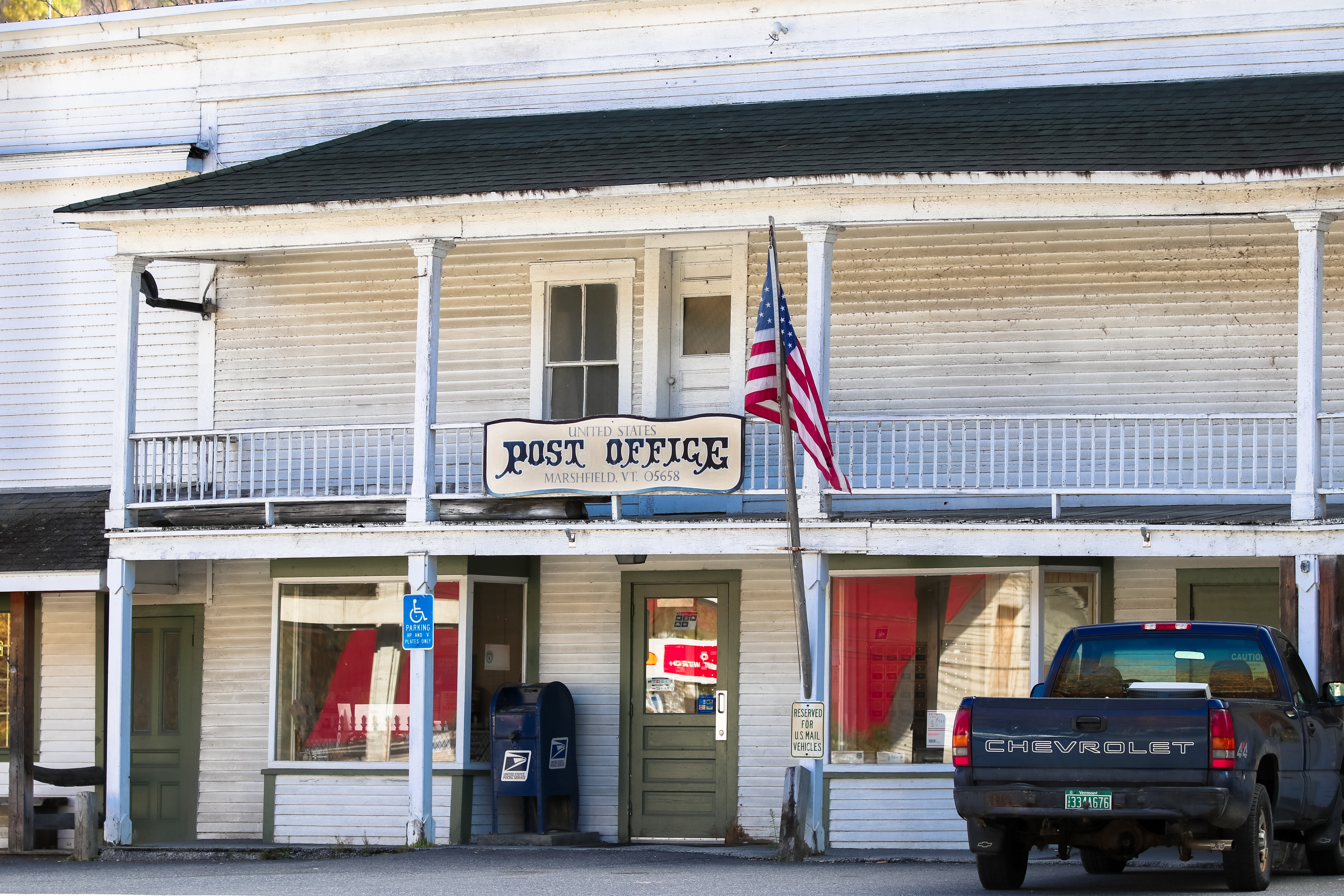
- U.S. Post Office, Marshfield, VT 05658

- Location in Washington County and the state of Vermont
- Coordinates: 44°21′07″N 72°21′07″W
- Country: United States
- State: Vermont
- County: Washington

Area
  - Total: 0.27 sq mi (0.69 km^{2})
  - Land: 0.26 sq mi (0.67 km^{2})
  - Water: 0.0077 sq mi (0.02 km^{2})
- Elevation: 896 ft (273 m)

Population (2020)
  - Total: 229
  - Density: 890/sq mi (340/km^{2})
- Time zone: UTC-5 (Eastern (EST))
  - Summer (DST): UTC-4 (EDT)
- ZIP code: 05658
- Area code: 802
- FIPS code: 50-43525
- GNIS feature ID: 2378315

Marshfield is a village in the town of Marshfield in Washington County, Vermont, United States. The population was 229 at the 2020 census.

== Geography ==
According to the United States Census Bureau, the village has a total area of 0.27 square miles (0.7 km^{2}), all land.

== Demographics ==
Historical population
Census	Pop.	Note	%±
1920	244		—
1930	207		−15.2%
1940	292		41.1%
1950	274		−6.2%
1960	313		14.2%
1970	322		2.9%
1980	301		−6.5%
1990	257		−14.6%
2000	262		1.9%
2010	273		4.2%
2020	229		−16.1%
U.S. Decennial Census

As of the census of 2000, there were 262 people, 96 households, and 72 families residing in the village. The population density was 888.5 people per square mile (348.8/km^{2}). There were 112 housing units at an average density of 379.8/sq mi (149.1/km^{2}). The racial makeup of the village was 98.09% White, 0.38% Asian, and 1.53% from two or more races. Hispanic or Latino of any race were 0.76% of the population.

There were 96 households, out of which 38.5% had children under the age of 18 living with them, 57.3% were married couples living together, 13.5% had a female householder with no husband present, and 25.0% were non-families. 20.8% of all households were made up of individuals, and 5.2% had someone living alone who was 65 years of age or older. The average household size was 2.73 and the average family size was 3.10.

In the village, the population was spread out, with 27.5% under the age of 18, 14.9% from 18 to 24, 26.7% from 25 to 44, 21.4% from 45 to 64, and 9.5% who were 65 years of age or older. The median age was 33 years. For every 100 females, there were 97.0 males. For every 100 females age 18 and over, there were 100.0 males.

The median income for a household in the village was $43,542, and the median income for a family was $42,188. Males had a median income of $31,000 versus $24,375 for females. The per capita income for the village was $14,156. About 9.2% of families and 7.0% of the population were below the poverty line, including 9.4% of those under the age of eighteen and none of those 65 or over.
