= East Montpelier (CDP), Vermont =

Census-designated place in Vermont, United States

East Montpelier, Vermont
- Census-designated place
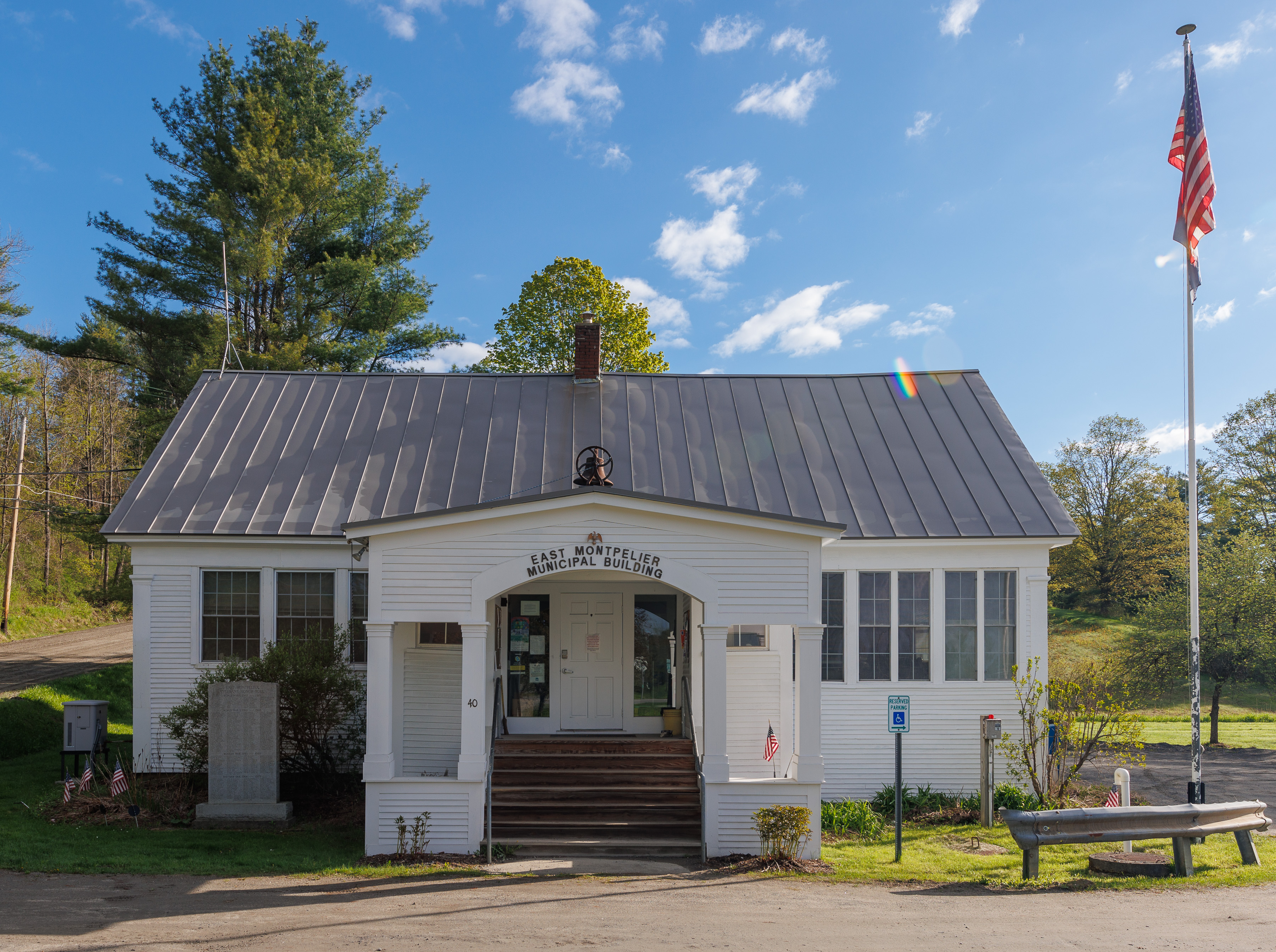
- East Montpelier town office

- Location in Washington County and the state of Vermont
- Coordinates: 44°16′06″N 72°29′25″W
- Country: United States
- State: Vermont
- County: Washington

Area
  - Total: 0.097 sq mi (0.25 km^{2})
  - Land: 0.093 sq mi (0.24 km^{2})
  - Water: 0.0039 sq mi (0.01 km^{2})
- Elevation: 692 ft (211 m)

Population (2010)
  - Total: 80
  - Density: 860/sq mi (330/km^{2})
- Time zone: UTC-5 (Eastern (EST))
  - Summer (DST): UTC-4 (EDT)
- ZIP code: 05651
- Area code: 802
- FIPS code: 50-21850
- GNIS feature ID: 2584789

East Montpelier is a census-designated place (CDP) comprising the central village of the town of East Montpelier, Washington County, Vermont, United States. The population of the CDP was 80 at the 2010 census.

== Geography ==
According to the United States Census Bureau, the East Montpelier CDP has a total area of 0.097 square miles (0.25 km^{2}), of which 0.093 square miles (0.24 km^{2}) is land and 0.004 square miles (0.01 km^{2}), or 5.21%, is water. East Montpelier is located along U.S. Route 2, 7 miles (11 km) east of the center of Montpelier, the state capital, and 31 miles (50 km) west of St. Johnsbury. Vermont Route 14 also passes through the village, leading north to Hardwick and south to Barre.

East Montpelier is located on the north bank of the Winooski River.

== Education ==
The school district is Washington Central Supervisory Union.
