= Montpelier Roxbury Public Schools =

School district in Vermont, United States

Montpelier Roxbury Public School District or Montpelier Roxbury Public Schools (MRPS) is a school district headquartered in Montpelier, Vermont.

It covers Montpelier and Roxbury.

It operates three schools: Union Elementary School, Main Street Middle School, and Montpelier High School.

== History ==
It assumed its present state in 2018 when the Montpelier and Roxbury districts merged.

Elizabeth "Libby" Bonesteel was scheduled to become the superintendent on July 1, 2018. Brian Ricca was previously the superintendent of the Montpelier school system.

In 2024, the district closed the Roxbury Village School.
