= Montpelier Public Schools =

USA School District

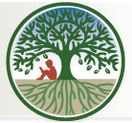

Location
- Montpelier, Vermont and surrounding small towns United States
- Coordinates: 44°15′36″N 72°35′16″W

District information
- Grades: K-12
- Superintendent: Libby Bonesteel
- Schools: 3
- Budget: $17.8 million

Students and staff
- Students: 939
- Colors: Green, White

Other information
- Website: mpsvt.org

Montpelier School District, also known as Montpelier Public Schools (MPS), was a K-12 school district in Montpelier, Vermont, USA. Its business office was located in Montpelier High School.

It which served as the governing body of Union Elementary School, Main Street Middle School, and Montpelier High.

It served students in some towns such as Calais, Adamant, Berlin, and East Montpelier, offering Main Street Middle School and Montpelier High School as an alternative to U-32 Junior/Senior High School.

== History ==
Montpelier High School was created as a successor to the Washington County Grammar School, incorporated in 1813. MHS first issued diplomas in 1914, the year a new high school building opened on Main Street. That building was replaced by the current building, off Bailey Avenue, which opened in 1956. As Montpelier Public Schools began to adopt the new middle school model, the old high school building was converted into Main Street Middle School, and continues to house grades 6, 7, and 8. The present high school building was enlarged in 1998. In 2015, the 5th Grade in Montpelier Public Schools was moved from Union Elementary School to Main Street Middle School.

Brian Ricca worked as superintendent until circa 2018. Stephen Mills of the Times Argus stated that his leaving the post was "unexpected".

In 2018, the district merged into Montpelier Roxbury Public Schools.

== Budget ==
In 2014, the Montpelier School Board approved a budget of $17.8 million for FY 15. This is an increase from $17.4 million in FY 14.
