= National Development Fund (Saudi Arabia) =

Saudi government development fund

- Native name: صندوق التنمية الوطني
- Founded: 4 October 2017; 9 years ago
- Headquarters: Riyadh, Saudi Arabia
- Key people: Mohammad bin Salman, (Chairman); Abdulaziz Al-Arifi, (Governor)
- Website: ndf.gov.sa

The National Development Fund (Arabic: صندوق التنمية الوطني) is a Saudi government fund established by royal order in 2017 to supervise development funds and banks in Saudi Arabia. It is organizationally linked to the Prime Minister and is based in Riyadh. The fund coordinates a group of development financing institutions involved in sectors such as real estate, industry, agriculture, social development, tourism, culture, infrastructure, and small and medium enterprises.

== Supervised Development Funds and Banks ==
The NDF lists the following development funds and banks as part of its development-financing network:

- Real Estate Development Fund
- Saudi Fund for Development
- Saudi Industrial Development Fund
- Agricultural Development Fund
- Social Development Bank
- Human Resources Development Fund
- Cultural Development Fund
- Events Investment Fund
- Saudi EXIM Bank
- Tourism Development Fund
- Small and Medium Enterprise Bank
- National Infrastructure Fund

== NDF and Vision 2030 ==
Saudi Vision 2030 is a national framework for economic diversification in Saudi Arabia. Within this framework, the NDF supervises and coordinates development funds and banks whose financing activities cover sectors including real estate, industry, agriculture, social development, tourism, culture, infrastructure, and small and medium enterprises.

In March 2022, Reuters reported that Saudi Arabia had launched a new NDF strategy under which the fund was expected to inject more than 570 billion riyals into the economy by 2030.

== See also ==
- Public Investment Fund

== Social Media ==
- X Platform
- Linkedin
- Youtube
