= Worcester, Vermont =

- Town
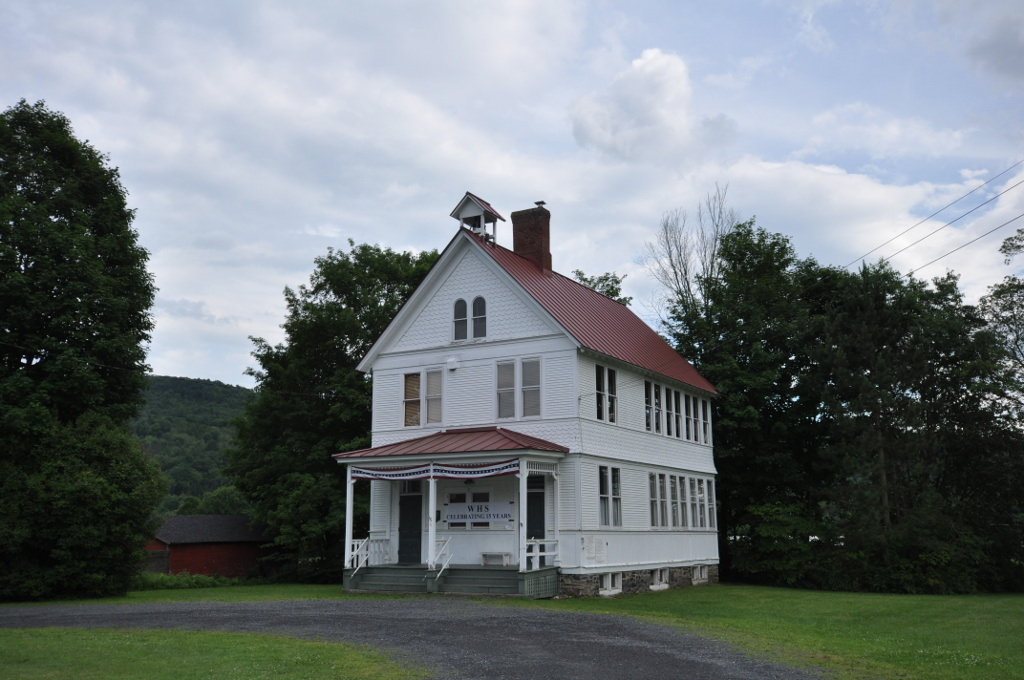
- Village School in Worcester now a historical society museum.

- Location in Washington County and the state of Vermont
- Coordinates: 44°23′45″N 72°34′12″W
- Country: United States
- State: Vermont
- County: Washington
- Communities: Worcester

Area
  - Total: 38.8 sq mi (100.6 km^{2})
  - Land: 38.8 sq mi (100.4 km^{2})
  - Water: 0.077 sq mi (0.2 km^{2})
- Elevation: 1,348 ft (411 m)

Population (2020)
  - Total: 964
  - Density: 24.9/sq mi (9.60/km^{2})
- Time zone: UTC-5 (Eastern (EST))
  - Summer (DST): UTC-4 (EDT)
- ZIP code: 05682
- Area code: 802
- FIPS code: 50-86125
- GNIS feature ID: 1462273
- Website: worcestervt.org

Worcester is a town in Washington County, Vermont, United States. The population was 964 at the 2020 census.

== History ==
Worcester was chartered on June 8, 1763, by a Loyalist Governor in New Hampshire. It has been reported that excellent records were kept on file at the first Town Clerk's office when the Town of Worcester was first settled, but today the exact date of the Town's organization remains a mystery. A fire destroyed the Town's early records.

== Geography ==
According to the United States Census Bureau, the town has a total area of 38.8 square miles (100.6 km^{2}), of which 38.8 square miles (100.4 km^{2}) is land and 0.1 square mile (0.2 km^{2}) (0.21%) is water. The primary settlement is the village of Worcester.

=== Climate ===
Climate data for Worcester 2 W, Vermont, 1991–2020 normals: 1360ft (415m)
Month	Jan	Feb	Mar	Apr	May	Jun	Jul	Aug	Sep	Oct	Nov	Dec	Year
Mean daily maximum °F (°C)	26.0 (−3.3)	29.1 (−1.6)	37.9 (3.3)	50.9 (10.5)	64.6 (18.1)	72.4 (22.4)	76.9 (24.9)	74.8 (23.8)	67.6 (19.8)	54.1 (12.3)	41.6 (5.3)	30.9 (−0.6)	52.2 (11.2)
Daily mean °F (°C)	17.1 (−8.3)	19.7 (−6.8)	28.2 (−2.1)	41.4 (5.2)	54.3 (12.4)	62.8 (17.1)	67.3 (19.6)	65.3 (18.5)	57.8 (14.3)	45.9 (7.7)	34.5 (1.4)	23.9 (−4.5)	43.2 (6.2)
Mean daily minimum °F (°C)	8.3 (−13.2)	10.3 (−12.1)	18.6 (−7.4)	31.9 (−0.1)	44.1 (6.7)	53.2 (11.8)	57.7 (14.3)	55.7 (13.2)	48.0 (8.9)	37.6 (3.1)	27.5 (−2.5)	17.0 (−8.3)	34.2 (1.2)
Average precipitation inches (mm)	3.17 (81)	2.82 (72)	3.13 (80)	3.69 (94)	4.27 (108)	4.92 (125)	4.76 (121)	4.39 (112)	3.39 (86)	4.28 (109)	3.60 (91)	3.87 (98)	46.29 (1,177)
Average snowfall inches (cm)	27.00 (68.6)	28.50 (72.4)	21.00 (53.3)	8.00 (20.3)	0.80 (2.0)	0.00 (0.00)	0.00 (0.00)	0.00 (0.00)	0.00 (0.00)	2.10 (5.3)	10.40 (26.4)	27.80 (70.6)	125.6 (318.9)
Source: NOAA

== Commerce ==
The general store in Worcester is LBJ's Grocery, located at 44 Worcester Village Road. The Post Office Cafe opened next door to LBJ's grocery in 2012, and shares a building with the town's post office. Black Crow Coffee now shares the building as of 2026. They will be closing at the end of August for unknown reasons.

The Vermont Association of Snow Travelers trail network passes through Worcester.

Worcester's homes and businesses are supplied with water by a mix of private wells and public town water supplied by Worcester Fire District #1. Electricity in Worcester is supplied by Green Mountain Power and Washington Electric Cooperative. Cellular coverage in Worcester is limited, with no service inside many homes in town.

== Demographics ==
Historical population
Census	Pop.	Note	%±
1800	25		—
1810	41		64.0%
1820	44		7.3%
1830	432		881.8%
1840	567		31.3%
1850	702		23.8%
1860	684		−2.6%
1870	775		13.3%
1880	802		3.5%
1890	725		−9.6%
1900	636		−12.3%
1910	694		9.1%
1920	463		−33.3%
1930	471		1.7%
1940	396		−15.9%
1950	445		12.4%
1960	417		−6.3%
1970	505		21.1%
1980	727		44.0%
1990	906		24.6%
2000	902		−0.4%
2010	998		10.6%
2020	964		−3.4%
U.S. Decennial Census

As of the census of 2000, there were 902 people, 346 households, and 251 families residing in the town. The population density was 23.3 people per square mile (9.0/km^{2}). There were 396 housing units at an average density of 10.2 per square mile (3.9/km^{2}). The racial makeup of the town was 97.67% White, 0.55% Native American, 0.33% from other races, and 1.44% from two or more races. Hispanic or Latino of any race were 0.89% of the population.

There were 346 households, out of which 34.4% had children under the age of 18 living with them, 60.1% were couples living together and joined in either marriage or civil union, 8.1% had a female householder with no husband present, and 27.2% were non-families. 18.8% of all households were made up of individuals, and 4.0% had someone living alone who was 65 years of age or older. The average household size was 2.61 and the average family size was 2.96.

In the town, the population was spread out, with 26.4% under the age of 18, 6.8% from 18 to 24, 28.8% from 25 to 44, 31.6% from 45 to 64, and 6.4% who were 65 years of age or older. The median age was 38 years. For every 100 females, there were 100.4 males. For every 100 females age 18 and over, there were 100.6 males.

The median income for a household in the town was $39,732, and the median income for a family was $48,750. Males had a median income of $32,083 versus $27,083 for females. The per capita income for the town was $19,698. About 6.0% of families and 8.5% of the population were below the poverty line, including 8.6% of those under age 18 and none of those age 65 or over.

== Gallery ==
Worcester, Vermont
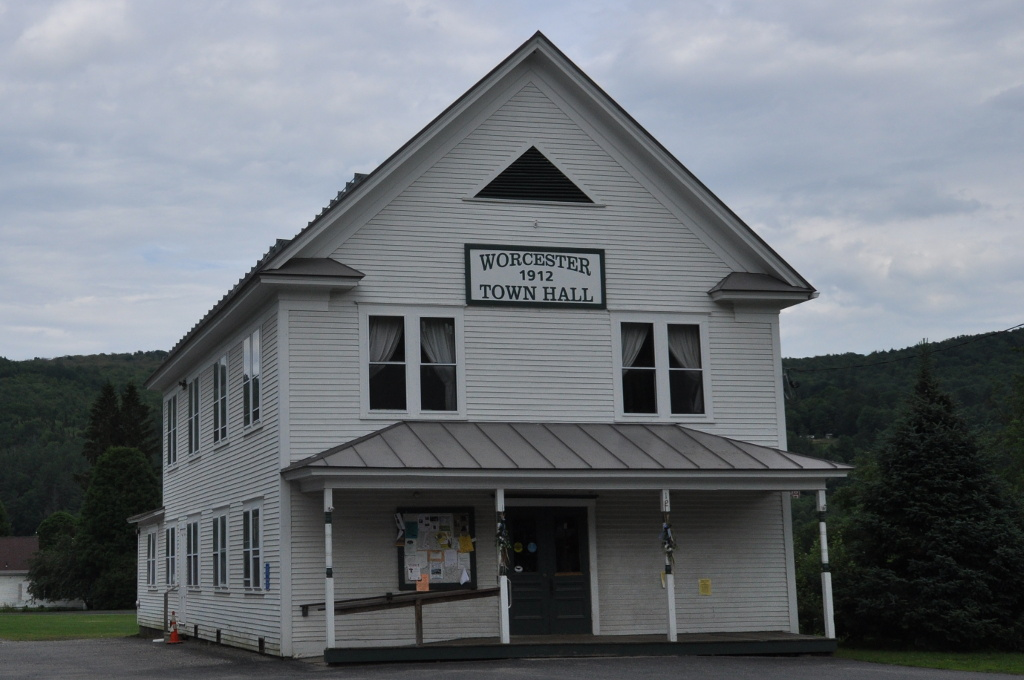
Town Hall

United Methodist Church

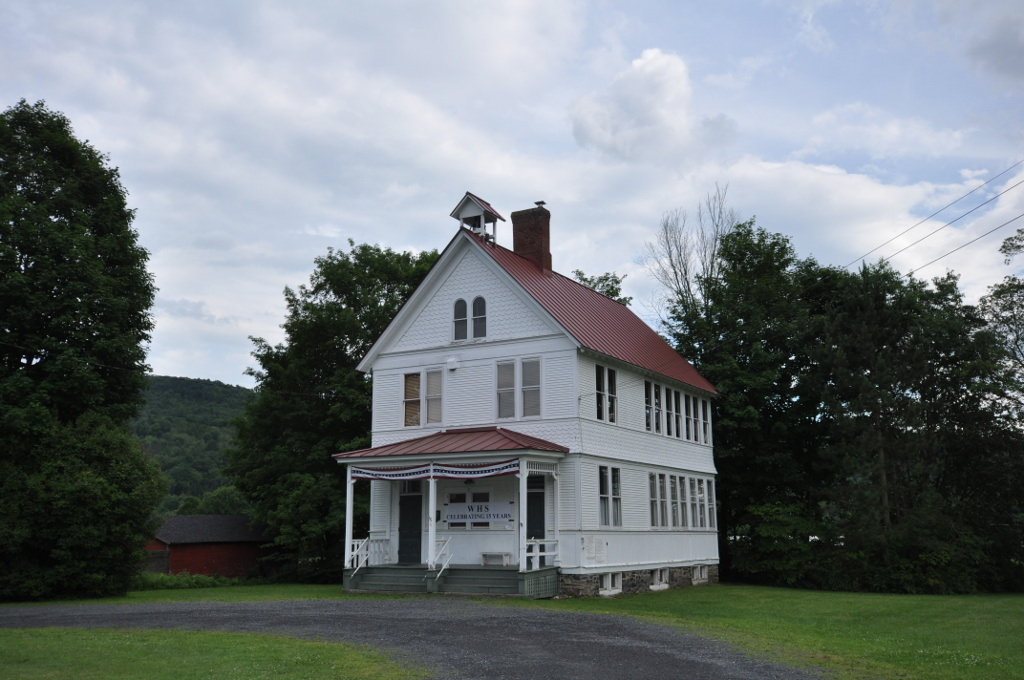
Historical Society Museum
