= Marshfield, Vermont =

- Town
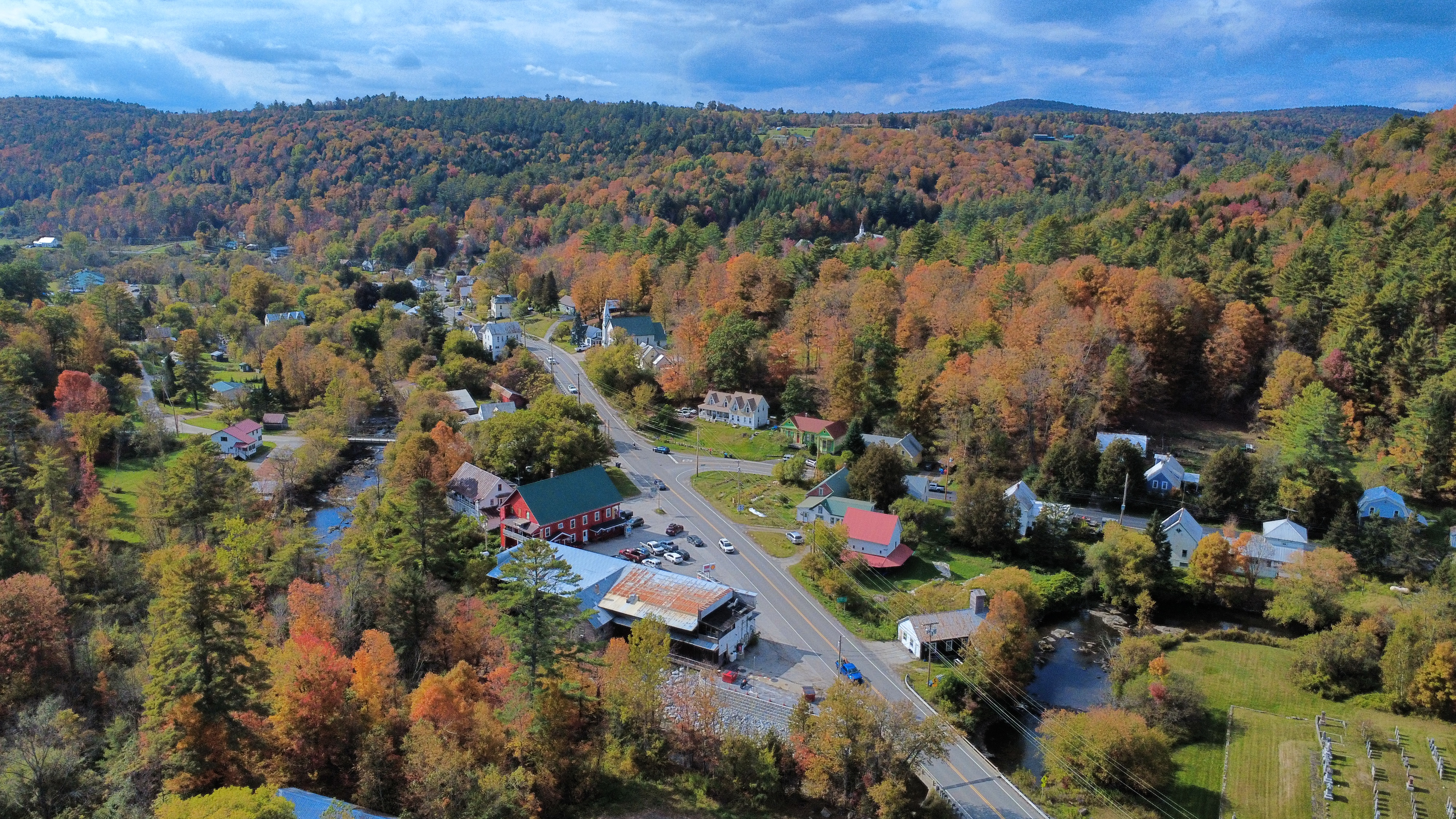
- Marshfield, VT, from the east

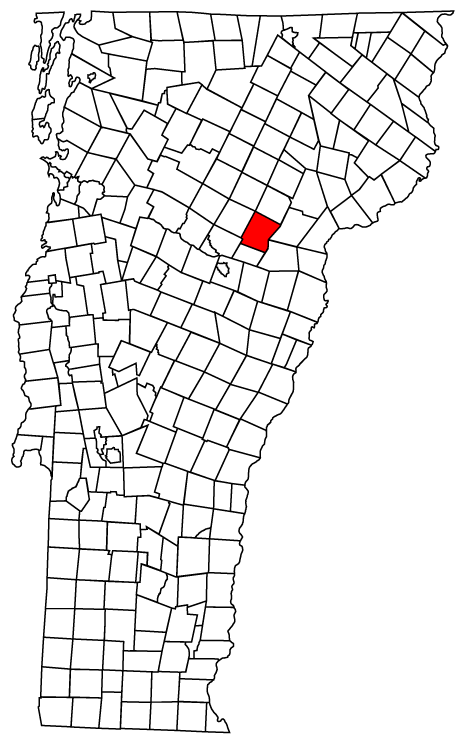
- Marshfield, Vermont
- Coordinates: 44°18′56″N 72°21′39″W
- Country: United States
- State: Vermont
- County: Washington
- Communities: Marshfield

Area
  - Total: 43.4 sq mi (112.4 km^{2})
  - Land: 43.4 sq mi (112.4 km^{2})
  - Water: 0.12 sq mi (0.3 km^{2})
- Elevation: 1,742 ft (531 m)

Population (2020)
  - Total: 1,583
  - Density: 37/sq mi (14.1/km^{2})
- Time zone: UTC-5 (Eastern (EST))
  - Summer (DST): UTC-4 (EDT)
- ZIP Codes: 05658 (Marshfield); 05667 (Plainfield)
- Area code: 802
- GNIS feature ID: 1462144
- Website: https://marshfieldvt.gov/

Marshfield is a town in Washington County, Vermont, United States. The population was 1,583 at the 2020 census.

== History ==
The town was named for Captain Isaac Marsh, who bought the original town site.

== Geography ==
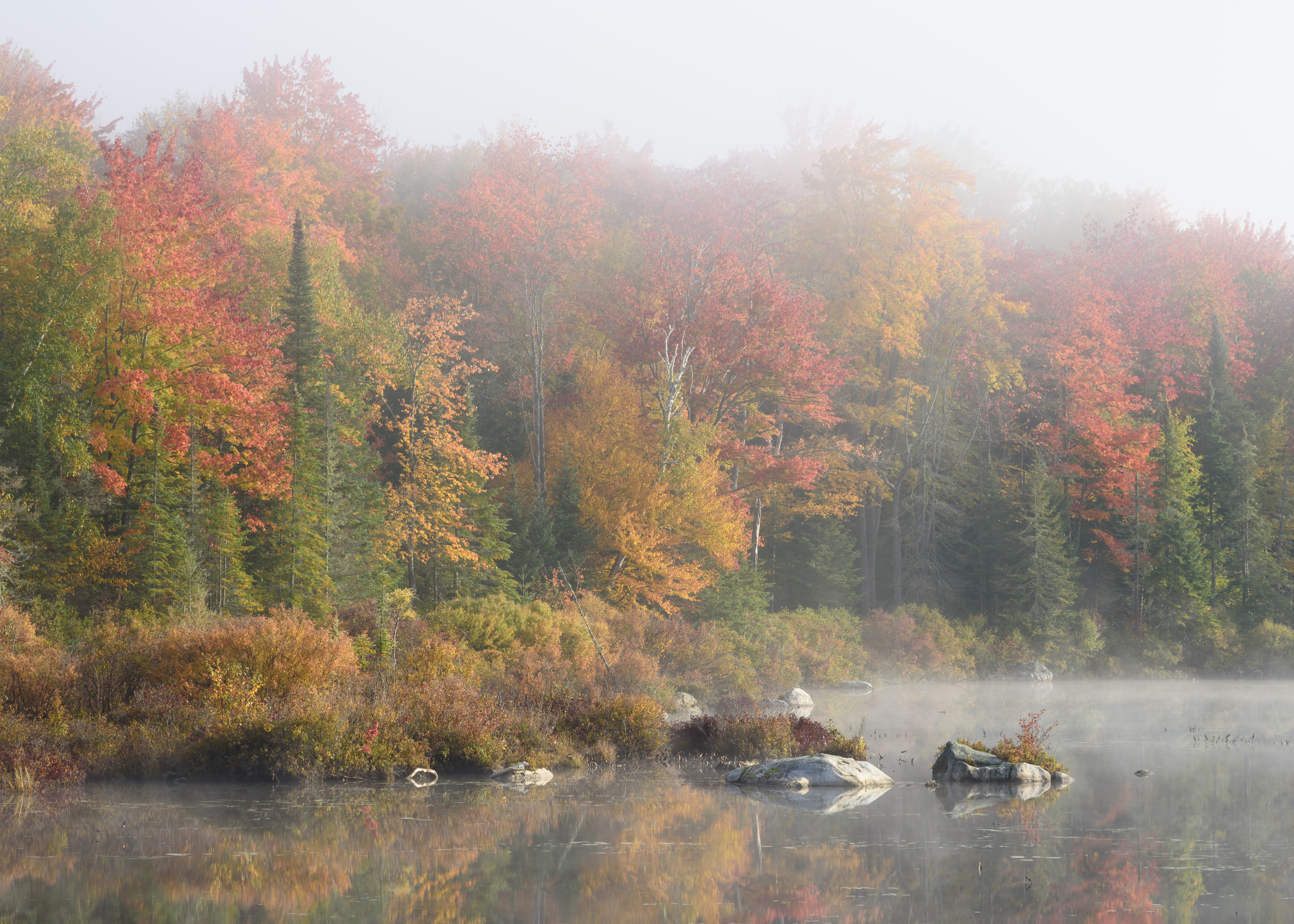
Marshfield Pond in autumn foliage

According to the United States Census Bureau, the town has a total area of 43.4 square miles (112.4 km^{2}), of which 43.1 square miles (111.6 km^{2}, 99.29%) is land and 0.3 square miles (0.8 km^{2}, 0.71%) is water.

== Demographics ==
Historical population
Census	Pop.	Note	%±
1800	172		—
1810	513		198.3%
1820	710		38.4%
1830	1,271		79.0%
1840	1,156		−9.0%
1850	1,102		−4.7%
1860	1,160		5.3%
1870	1,072		−7.6%
1880	1,102		2.8%
1890	1,121		1.7%
1900	1,032		−7.9%
1910	1,011		−2.0%
1920	898		−11.2%
1930	872		−2.9%
1940	901		3.3%
1950	830		−7.9%
1960	891		7.3%
1970	1,033		15.9%
1980	1,267		22.7%
1990	1,331		5.1%
2000	1,496		12.4%
2010	1,588		6.1%
2020	1,583		−0.3%
U.S. Decennial Census

As of the census of 2000, there were 1,496 people, 575 households, and 416 families residing in the town. The population density was 34.7 people per square mile (13.4/km^{2}). There were 686 housing units at an average density of 15.9 per square mile (6.1/km^{2}). The racial makeup of the town was 96.86% White, 0.74% Black or African American, 0.13% Native American, 0.40% Asian, 0.20% from other races, and 1.67% from two or more races. Hispanic or Latino of any race were 0.67% of the population.

There were 575 households, out of which 39.5% had children under the age of 18 living with them, 56.5% were couples living together and joined in either marriage or civil union, 9.6% had a female householder with no husband present, and 27.5% were non-families. 20.9% of all households were made up of individuals, and 5.0% had someone living alone who was 65 years of age or older. The average household size was 2.60 and the average family size was 3.01.

In the town, the population was spread out, with 27.9% under the age of 18, 6.6% from 18 to 24, 30.4% from 25 to 44, 26.1% from 45 to 64, and 9.0% who were 65 years of age or older. The median age was 38 years. For every 100 females, there were 102.4 males. For every 100 females age 18 and over, there were 102.6 males.

The median income for a household in the town was $40,603, and the median income for a family was $44,063. Males had a median income of $30,852 versus $25,823 for females. The per capita income for the town was $18,649. About 8.0% of families and 9.1% of the population were below the poverty line, including 14.1% of those under age 18 and 5.8% of those age 65 or over.

== Notable people ==
- Larry Gordon (musician), musician and founder of the Word of Mouth Chorus and artist with the Bread and Puppet Theatre
- Andrew Perchlik, member of the Vermont Senate
- Levi P. Powers, Wisconsin legislator and judge, was born in the town
- Dave Rogers, NASCAR performance director for 23XI Racing.

== In popular culture ==
Portions of the 1983 film adaptation of Robert Cormier's novel I Am the Cheese were filmed in Marshfield.
