= John Charles Haines =

American politician

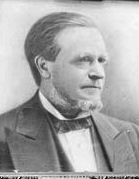

20th Mayor of Chicago
- In office March 2, 1858 – March 22, 1860
- Preceded by: John Wentworth
- Succeeded by: John Wentworth

Chicago Alderman from the 5th ward
- In office 1848–1854 Serving with Thomas James (1848–1849); E.H. Chapin (1849); Alson S. Sherman (1849–1851); J.L. James (1851–1853); William H. Scoville (1853–1854)
- Preceded by: John Sheriffs
- Succeeded by: Jasper D. Ward

Personal details
- Born: May 26, 1818 Deerfield, New York, United States
- Died: July 4, 1896 (aged 78) near Waukegan, Illinois, United States
- Resting place: Rosehill Cemetery
- Party: Democratic Party

John Charles Haines (May 26, 1818 – July 4, 1896) served as mayor of Chicago, Illinois (1858–1860) for the Democratic Party.

== Biography ==
John Charles Haines was born in Deerfield, New York on May 26, 1818. He arrived in Chicago on May 26, 1834 and took on work as a clerk for George W. Merrill. By 1846, he formed a partnership with Jared Gage and acquired several flour mills. Haines worked to organize the Chicago waterwork beginning in 1854. In 1848, he was elected to the first of six terms on the city council and two terms as the water commissioner. He was elected mayor in 1858 as a Republican, defeating Democrat Daniel Brainard with 54% of the vote. He successfully ran for re-election the following year against Marcus D. Gilman, winning with about 53% of the vote.

Haines served as an elected members of the board of the Chicago Historical Society and on the Board of Health. He was also a founding member of the Chicago Board of Trade. In 1870, he was sent to the Illinois Constitutional Convention and helped write a new Constitution for the state. He was elected to the Illinois State Senate for two terms from the First District in 1874. After he left the State Senate, he retired from public life near Waukegan, Illinois, where he owned a small farm. He died there on July 4, 1896, and was buried at Rosehill Cemetery.

Haines was a member of the First Unitarian Church of Chicago.

An elementary school, consisting of grades Pre-K to 8th, has been named after John Charles Haines. He was the brother of Illinois Speaker of the House Elijah Haines.
