= Old West Church =

Old West Church may refer to:

- Old West Church (Boston, Massachusetts), a historic church, counterpart to Old North Church
- Old West Church (Calais, Vermont), listed on the NRHP in Vermont
