= Marcus D. Gilman =

American politician

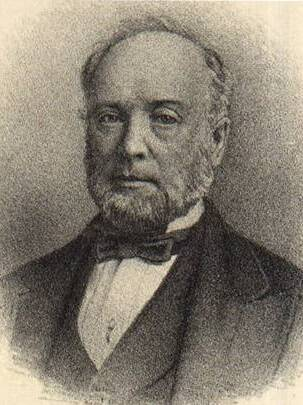
- From 1882's Vermont Historical Gazeteer

Member of the Vermont House of Representatives
- In office October 7, 1874 – October 3, 1876
- Preceded by: Perley P. Pitkin
- Succeeded by: Charles T. Sabin
- Constituency: Montpelier

Personal details
- Born: Marcus Davis Gilman; January 28, 1820 Calais, Vermont
- Died: January 5, 1889 (aged 68) Montpelier, Vermont
- Resting place: Green Mount Cemetery, Montpelier, Vermont, US
- Party: Democratic
- Relatives: John M. Gilman (brother); Dorman Bridgman Eaton (step-brother)
- Occupation: Businessman; Merchant; Historian

Marcus Davis Gilman (January 28, 1820 – January 5, 1889) was an American politician, businessman, and historian.

Born in Calais, Washington County, Vermont, Gilman went to the Calais public schools and to the Washington County Grammar School in Montpelier, Vermont. He worked in the mercantile business in Montpelier and Northfield, Vermont. In 1844, Gilman and his wife moved to Chicago, Illinois where they lived until 1868. While living in Chicago, Gilman was a merchant. In 1859, Gilman was an unsuccessful nominee for the office of mayor of Chicago, running on the Democratic ticket. From 1868 to 1871, Gilman and his wife lived in Newton, Massachusetts. In 1871, Gilman and his wife moved to Montpelier, Vermont. In 1874, Gilman served in the Vermont House of Representatives and was a Democrat. Gilman was librarian of the Vermont Historical Society from 1874 to 1881 and compiled an extensive bibliography of Vermont-related works which was collected and published after his death. Gilman died in Montpelier, Vermont.

Gilman's younger brother John M. Gilman became a lawyer and politician in St. Paul, Minnesota; his step-brother Dorman Bridgman Eaton was a lawyer in New York City well known for his work on civil service reform.

Party political offices
Preceded by Daniel Brainard	Democratic nominee for Mayor of Chicago; 1858	Succeeded by John Wentworth
