= William W. Noyes =

American Civil War Medal of Honor recipient

William Wallace Noyes
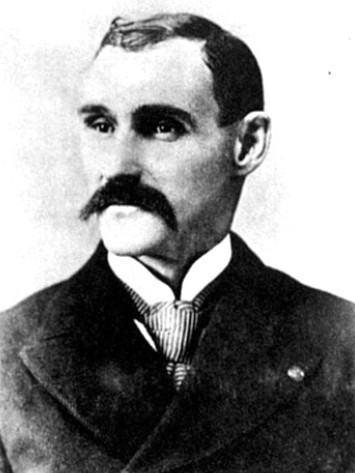
- Born: April 23, 1846; Montpelier, Vermont, US
- Died: July 1, 1910 (aged 64); Montpelier, Vermont, US
- Burial place: Cutler Cemetery East Montpelier, Vermont
- Military career
- Allegiance: United States of America; Union
- Branch: United States Army; Union Army
- Rank: Private
- Units: Company F, 2nd Vermont Volunteer Infantry Regiment
- Conflicts: American Civil War
- Awards: Medal of Honor

William W. Noyes (April 23, 1846—July 1, 1910) was an American Civil War veteran who received the Medal of Honor.

== Biography ==
Noyes was actually named Wallace William Noyes; his name was transposed in his military records. He was born in Montpelier, Vermont on April 23, 1846, and he was educated in the local schools.

Noyes served as a private in Company F, 2nd Vermont Infantry; He enlisted on July 21, 1863, and was mustered in on the same day. Noyes joined as a substitute for Joseph Sterling of Montpelier, Vermont, who had been drafted and hired Noyes to serve for him.

He was awarded the Medal of Honor in 1892 for action on May 12, 1864 at the Battle of Spotsylvania Court House. Incensed at the death of his friend at the hands of Confederate soldiers who were waving white flags of truce to induce Union Army soldiers to lower their weapons, and then raising their own rifles to shoot the Union Army soldiers who had dropped their guard, Noyes climbed to the top of his regiment's defensive breastworks and called for his fellow soldiers to pass their rifles to him so he could engage the Confederates with rapid fire. The Confederate soldiers near his position were as close as 30 feet; he killed the nearest one immediately, and continued to fire as fast as his fellow soldiers could reload and hand him their rifles. His action temporarily stunned the Confederates into inaction. When they did return fire, the Confederates missed Noyes completely except for one round that knocked off his hat. After having his hat knocked off, Noyes ceased firing and returned to his unit's defenses; another 2nd Vermont Infantry soldier who attempted to repeat Noyes' act was immediately shot and killed by Confederates.

Noyes received the Medal of Honor for his efforts to restore the morale of his comrades and induce the Confederates to stop pretending to surrender. His citation reads "Standing upon the top of the breastworks, deliberately took aim and fired no less than 15 shots into the enemy's lines, but a few yards away."

He was wounded on April 2, 1865, during the Petersburg Breakthrough; he was struck in the right leg just above his ankle, and the bullet tore away a large portion of his calf muscle. He was still hospitalized when his regiment was discharged at the end of the war, and he did not receive his own discharge until October 1865.

After the war Noyes worked as a carpenter in Calais and Montpelier. Emily M Vinson (unknown–1898) and had three children: George Wallace Noyes (1867–1930), Minnie A Noyes Campbell (1872–1946), and Harry Arthur Noyes (1879–1947). On July 1, 1910, he was working on the roof of the Blanchard Block commercial building in Montpelier when he fell off; he dropped about 40 feet to the roof of the hardware store next door and fractured his skull. He died at the scene, and was buried at Cutler Cemetery in East Montpelier, Vermont.
