= Asahel Pierce =

- illustration of Pierce

Chicago Alderman
- In office 1847–1848 Serving with Henry Smith (1947–49) and G.W. Wentworth (1847–48)
- Preceded by: William M. Larrabee and Richard C. Ross
- Succeeded by: Daniel Richards
- Constituency: 6th ward
- In office 1844–1846 Serving with Thomas McDonough
- Preceded by: John Murphy Jr. and James Poussard
- Succeeded by: Henry Magee and Joseph Williams
- Constituency: 4th ward
- In office 1837–1840 Serving with John S.C. Hogan (1937–38); Francis C. Taylor (1838–39); John Murphy Jr. (1839–40)
- Preceded by: inaugural holder
- Succeeded by: Seth Johnson and William Otis Snell
- Constituency: 4th ward

Trustee of the Village of Chicago
- In office 1835–1836

Personal details
- Born: June 1812 Calais, Vermont
- Died: December 13, 1887 (aged 75) Chicago, Illinois
- Party: Republican

Asahel Pierce (June 1812–December 13, 1887) was an American merchant, pioneer and politician who was an early settler of Chicago. Pierce had business success in the manufacture of farm equipment and wholesale of clothing. Pierce served several stints as a member of the Chicago Common Council (city council).

== Early life ==
Pierce was born in June 1812 in Calais, Vermont. Until he was 18, he worked on his father's farm there. From 1830 to 1833, he completed an apprenticeship in the blacksmith trade. Recognizing this as a trade that would be valuable to him if he became a westward pioneer, he soon after traveled west.

== Arrival in Chicago ==
Asahel was an early settler of Chicago. He arrived in Chicago (at the time home to only 200 residents) in October 1833. He would continue to reside there until his death in 1887. In his many years living in Chicago, he became a well-known resident of the growing city.

== Business career ==
Soon after arriving in Chicago, Pierce received a contract to supply iron work to the first stagecoach line established to transport goods between Chicago and St Louis. In early 1834, be began manufacturing bull plows. He had to augment the design in order to make it more adept to dealing with the prairie sod in the region. His improved designed became in high-demand among local buyers, and its popularity was further boosted after it received prizes when entered into a contest at the State Fair held in Plainfield, Illinois. He continued manufacturing agricultural tools until 1856, when he opted to retire from this business in order to pivot his attention to real estate and construction. His work in construction had a significant impact in shaping Chicago in the decades of growth that followed.

In 1861, Pierce entered the wholesale clothing sales business, and saw quick success. Quickly, annual sakes of his wholesale house reached $1 million. His wholesale house became the first in Chicago to manufacture its own clothing in the city. This venture grew highly profitable.

In 1868, Pierce retired from working in the mercantile business.

== Political career ==
Pierce was long invested in Chicago politics. He first was elected a village trustee in 1835. He was later elected to several terms as alderman on the Chicago Common Council (city council).

Pierce was a member of the Republican Party.

== Death ==
For the final two decades of his life, Pierce suffered bronchitis attacks. On December 13, 1887, he died after a nine week bronchitis attack. With Pierce being of advance age and the attack being severe, three weeks into the attack his physician gave a grim prognosis of his likelihood of surviving. Pierce was ambulatory until the final two weeks of his life, being contained to a wheelchair for the final two weeks of his life. His memory remained sharp up until his death.

Pierce was survived by two daughters and three sons.
