= Maple Corner, Vermont =

Unincorporated village in Vermont, U.S.

Coordinates: 44°22′28″N 72°29′43″W

Maple Corner is a small, unincorporated village located in Calais, Vermont, United States, in the central part of the state.

The village contains the Maple Corner Store and Whammy Bar, and the Calais Post Office, which was originally in Kents' Corner. The south end of Curtis Pond, and the Calais Swimming Area are also within the village district.

The Maple Corner Community Center and the old Maple Corner Schoolhouse are also in the village.

Historically the village has been chiefly populated by two large families, the Fitches and the Morses. However, over the last decade two new families, the Lows and the Myers, have outpopulated the Fitches and Morses, especially since the Lows and the Myers are joined by a marriage of the two families.

Maple Corner gained national notoriety in 2002 & 2003 with the release of The Men of Maple Corner Calendar, featuring more than two dozen men (sans clothing) ranging in age from 18 to 82. Between the two years, more than 56,000 calendars were sold.
