= Ephraim W. Harrington =

American Civil War Medal of Honor recipient (1833–1914)

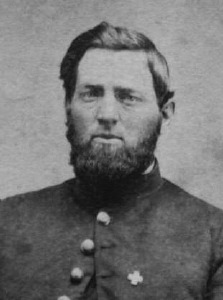
- Born: January 16, 1833; Waterford, Vermont
- Died: October 19, 1914 (aged 81); Attleboro, Massachusetts
- Burial place: Grove Cemetery; St. Johnsbury, Vermont
- Military career
- Allegiance: United States
- Branch: United States Army
- Rank: Captain
- Units: Company G, 2nd Vermont Infantry
- Conflicts: American Civil War; Battle of Chancellorsville
- Awards: Medal of Honor

Ephraim W. Harrington (January 16, 1833 - October 19, 1914) was a Union Army soldier in the American Civil War who received the U.S. military's highest decoration, the Medal of Honor.

Harrington was born in Waterford, Vermont on January 16, 1833, and entered service at Kirby, Vermont. He was awarded the Medal of Honor, for extraordinary heroism shown on May 3, 1863, at the Battle of Chancellorsville, while serving as a Sergeant with Company G, 2nd Vermont Infantry. His Medal of Honor was issued on December 13, 1893.

Harrington died at the age of 81, on October 19, 1914, and was buried at Grove Cemetery in St. Johnsbury, Vermont.

== Medal of Honor citation ==

The President of the United States of America, in the name of Congress, takes pleasure in presenting the Medal of Honor to Sergeant Ephraim W. Harrington, United States Army, for extraordinary heroism on 3 May 1863, while serving with Company G, 2d Vermont Infantry, in action at Fredericksburg, Virginia. Sergeant Harrington carried the colors to the top of the heights and almost to the muzzle of the enemy's guns.

== See also ==
- Battle of Chancellorsville
- Second Battle of Fredericksburg
- 2nd Vermont Infantry
