= Dorman Bridgman Eaton =

American lawyer

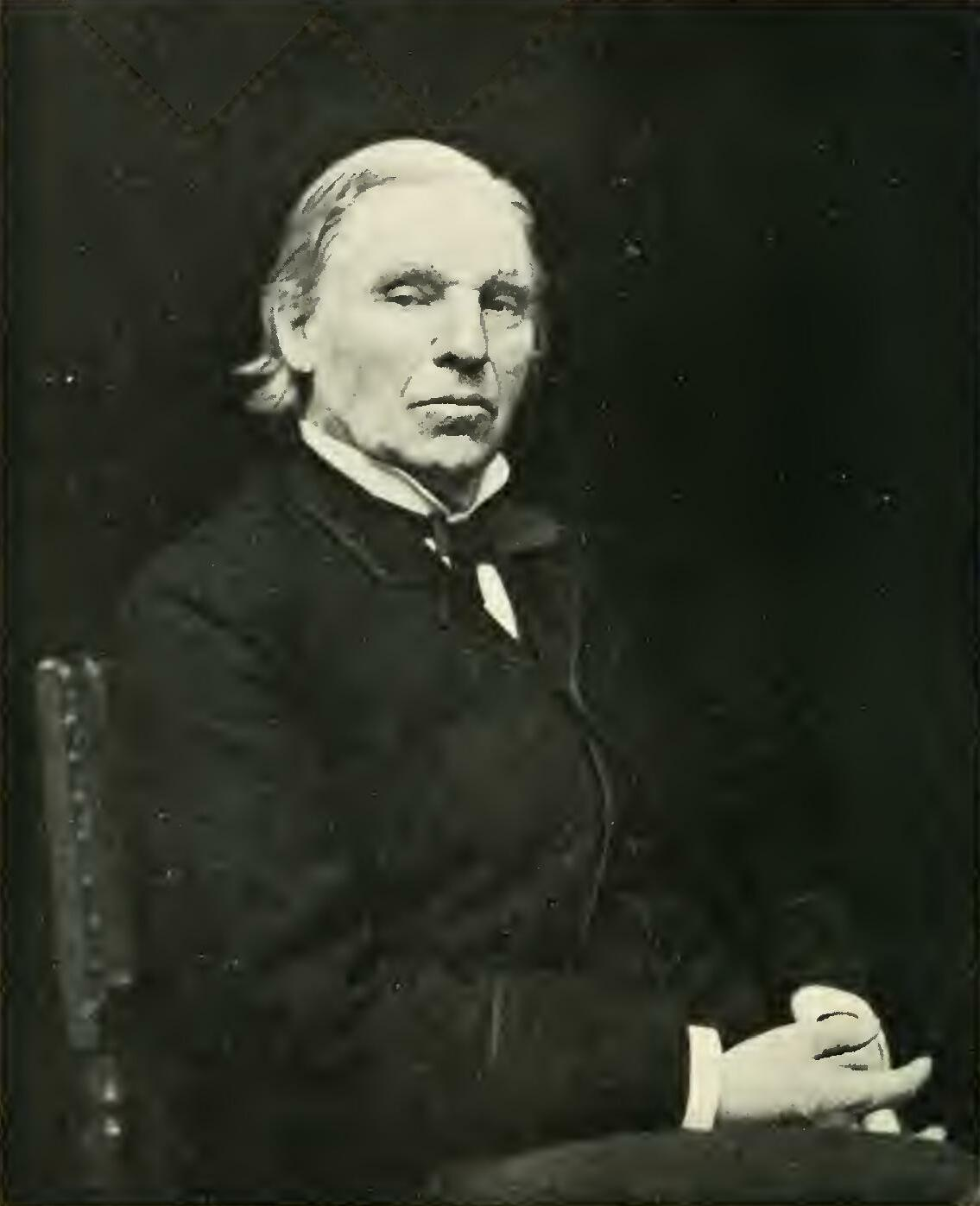
Dorman B. Eaton

Dorman Bridgman Eaton (June 27, 1823 – December 23, 1899) was an American lawyer instrumental in American federal Civil Service reform.

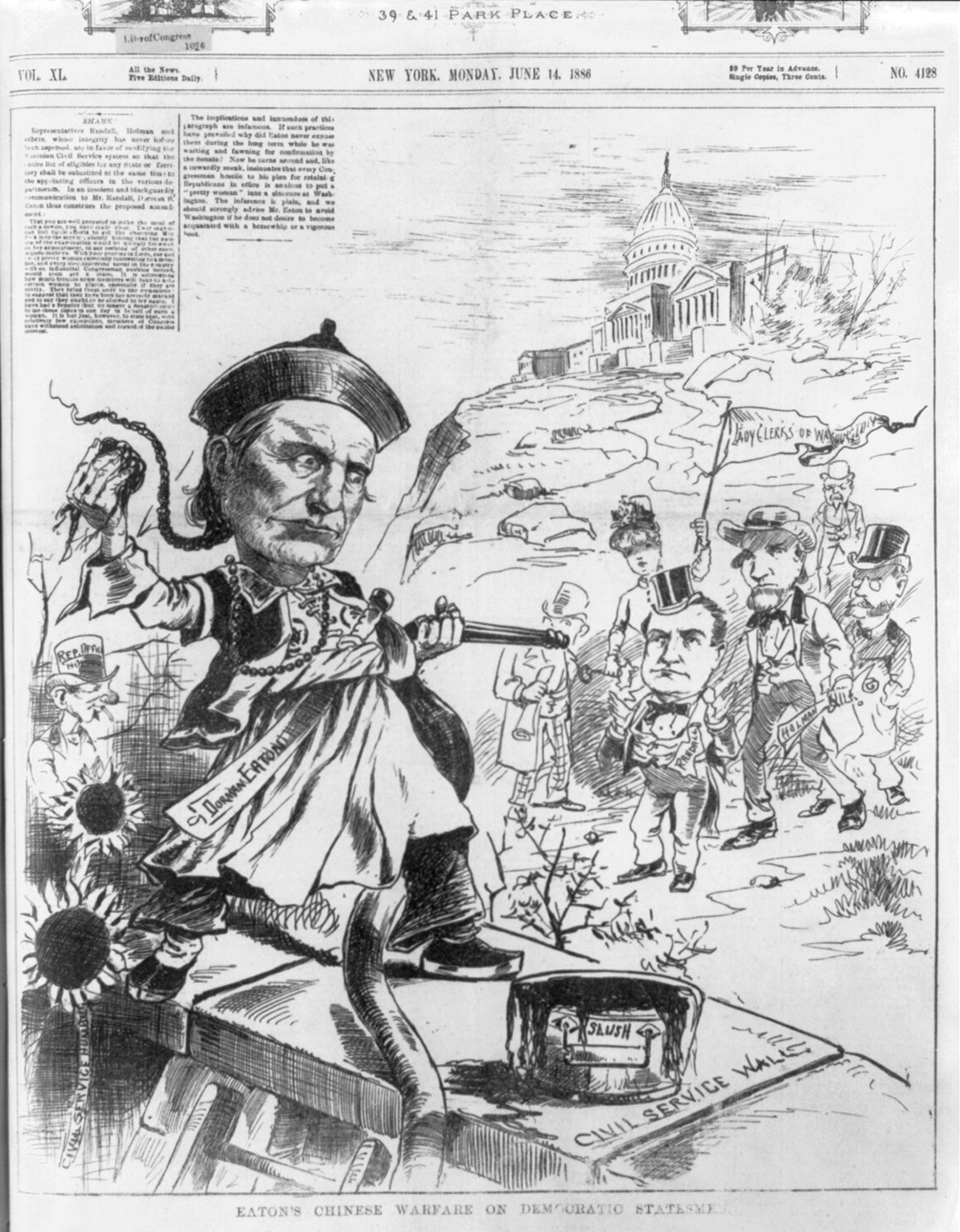
An unsympathetic cartoon of Eaton from The Daily Graphic, June 14, 1886 shows him defending a garden of "Civil Service Humbug"

Born at Hardwick, Vermont, he graduated at the University of Vermont in 1848 and at the Harvard Law School in 1850, and in the latter year was admitted to the bar in New York City. There he became associated in practice with William Kent, the son of the great chancellor James Kent, an edition of whose Commentaries he assisted in editing.

Eaton early became interested in municipal and civil service reform. In 1866, he wrote the New York City Metropolitan Health Law, which created the modern day New York City health department. He was conspicuous in the fight against Boss Tweed and his followers, by one of whom he was assaulted; he required a long period of rest, and went to Europe, where he studied the workings of the civil service in various countries. From 1873 to 1875 he was a member of the first United States Civil Service Commission.

In 1877, at the request of President Rutherford B. Hayes, he made a careful study of the British civil service, and three years later published Civil Service in Great Britain. He drafted the Pendleton Civil Service Act of 1883, and later became chairman of the new United States Civil Service Commission established by it. He resigned in 1885, but was almost immediately reappointed by President Grover Cleveland, and served until 1886, editing the 3rd and 4th Reports of the commission. He was an organizer (1878) of the first society for the furtherance of civil service reform in New York City, of the National Civil Service Reform League, and of the National Conference of the Unitarian Church (1865). He died in New York City on December 23, 1899, leaving $100,000 each to Harvard and Columbia universities for the establishments of professorships in government.

He was a legal writer and editor, and a frequent contributor to the leading reviews. In addition to the works mentioned he published Should Judges be Elected? (1873), The Independent Movement in New York (1880), Term and Tenure of Office (1882), The Spoils System and Civil Service Reform (1882), Problems of Police Legislation (1895) and The Government of Municipalities (1899). He also authored, under the pseudonym of "Junius", a series of pamphlets opposing the annexation of Hawaii.

== Family ==
Eaton's father Nathaniel Eaton (1791–1878) was a Vermont state senator in 1840 and later a judge. His step-brother John M. Gilman was a lawyer and politician in St. Paul, Minnesota; another step-brother, Marcus D. Gilman, a Chicago merchant and politician. Eaton married Annie S. Foster in 1856; they had no children.
