= East Calais, Vermont =

- Village
- Location within Vermont
- Coordinates: 44°21′59″N 72°25′47″W
- Country: United States
- State: Vermont
- County: Washington
- Elevation: 843 ft (257 m)
- Time zone: UTC-5 (Eastern (EST))
  - Summer (DST): UTC-4 (EDT)
- ZIP code: 05650
- Area code: 802
- GNIS feature ID: 1457265

East Calais is an unincorporated village in the town of Calais, Washington County, Vermont, United States. The community is located along Vermont Route 14, 10.3 miles (16.6 km) northeast of Montpelier. East Calais has a post office with ZIP code 05650, which opened on April 12, 1830. The heart of the village forms the East Calais Historic District, listed on the National Register of Historic Places in 2020.

== Location ==
East Calais is located in the eastern part of the town of Calais, on Vermont Route 14. The village is set on either side of Kingsbury Brook, which is paralleled by the highway in a relatively narrow valley. The traditional industrial and commercial heart of the village on the east side of the brook, lining the highway, with a general store and 19th-century Greek Revival church. There is a 19th-century dam spanning the brook and a former grist mill standing nearby. Most of the residential architecture is 19th century, reflecting the area's importance in that period as a small-scale manufacturing center.

== History ==
The town of Calais was incorporated in 1786, and grew in the early 19th century as a collection of independent villages. The first sawmill in East Calais was built about 1800 by John Lilley, a settler originally from Charlton, Massachusetts. By 1840, the mill complex included saw and grist mills, a trip hammer, forge, and other industries. The village also served as a major stop on a north-south stagecoach route. A major fire in 1873 destroyed ten buildings at the heart of the village, including its only hotel, the Moscow House. A small park now marks the site where those buildings stood. The mills operated until 1943; the gristmill was the last to operate in the town.

== See also ==
- National Register of Historic Places listings in Washington County, Vermont
