= 4th ward, Chicago =

4th Ward - Chicago
- Ward
- Ward 4
- Current Chicago ward map, with 4th ward highlighted in red
- Coordinates: 41.816°N 87.605°W
- Country: United States
- State: Illinois
- County: Cook
- City: Chicago
- Communities: list: Bronzeville; Kenwood; Hyde Park

Government
  - Type: Ward
  - Body: City of Chicago
  - Alderman: Lamont Robinson (D)
- Website: www.cityofchicago.org

The 4th Ward is one of the 50 aldermanic wards with representation in the City Council of Chicago, Illinois. It is divided into 28 election precincts. Lake Michigan is the ward's eastern boundary for much of its area. Its northwesternmost point, as of 2022, was located at the intersection of West Jackson Boulevard and South Clark Street and its southeasternmost point at the intersection of East 53rd Street and Lake Park Avenue.

== History ==
Ward (outlined in red) on an 1895 ward map

Boundaries of the ward used for the 2015 and 2019 aldermanic elections

The 4th Ward was one of six created upon Chicago's incorporation as a city in 1837. At the time its boundaries were the city limits at North Avenue and Wood Street to its respective north and west, Randolph Street to its south, and the Chicago River to its east. In 1847 it was moved to the Loop and Near South Side, being bounded by the Chicago River to its north and west, 22nd Street (modern-day Cermak) to its south, and Wells Street to its east. In 1857 the southern boundary was extended to 31st street and in 1863 the ward was significantly moved eastward, bounded by 16th street, Lake Michigan, 31st street, and Clark Street. In 1869 its southern boundary was retracted to 26th street.

In 1876 it was moved southward, between 26th Street and Egan Street (modern-day Pershing) and Lake Michigan and Clark Street. In 1887 it was moved south yet again, to the area bounded by the Lake, 33rd and 39th streets, and Stewart Avenue. In 1901 it was extended west to once again touch the River, which it would do until 1923. In 1923, coincident with the City being divided into its modern 50 wards, it covered Kenwood and northern Washington Park.

David K. Fremon wrote in 1988 that "No other ward has wealth and poverty in such proximity." Today the 4th Ward boasts 93,975 residents, with a racially diverse population that is plurality Black (46.0%), followed by White (30.2%), Asian (13.3%), Hispanic or Latino (6.4%), Multiracial (3.5%), Native (0.2%), and Other (0.5%). Between 2010 and 2018, the 4th Ward saw the second-largest population growth in the city after the 42nd Ward, driven primarily by the population influx in the South Loop.

== List of alderpersons ==
=== 1837 – 1923 ===
Before 1923, wards were represented by two aldermen.

Aldermen					# Council	Aldermen				
Alderman	Term in office	Party	Notes	Cite	# Council	Alderman	Term in office	Party	Notes	Cite
John S.C. Hogan	1837–1838		Redistricted to the 2nd ward in 1838		1st	Asahel Pierce	1837–1840			
Francis C. Taylor	1838–1839				2nd	Asahel Pierce	1837–1840			
John Murphy Jr.	1839–1840				3rd	Asahel Pierce	1837–1840			
Seth Johnson	1840–1841				4th	William Otis Snell	1840–1842			
G.W. Rogers	1841–1842				5th	William Otis Snell	1840–1842			
Eben C. Chalonder	1842–1843				6th	Daniel Elston	1842–1843		Later elected alderman again in 1851 in the 6th ward	
John Murphy Jr.	1843–1845				7th	William S. Warner	1843–1844			
John Murphy Jr.	1843–1845				8th	James Poussard	1844			
John Murphy Jr.	1843–1845				8th	Asahel Pierce	1844–1846			
Thomas McDonough	1845–1846				9th	Asahel Pierce	1844–1846			
Henry Magee	1846–1847				10th	Joseph Wilson	1846–1847			
Robert H. Foss	1847–1852	Republican	Later represented ward again (1854-55)		11th	Charles McDonnell	1847–1849		Previously served in same ward	
Robert H. Foss	1847–1852	Republican	Later represented ward again (1854-55)		12th	Charles McDonnell	1847–1849		Previously served in same ward	
Robert H. Foss	1847–1852	Republican	Later represented ward again (1854-55)		13th	Amos G. Throop	1849–1853		Later elected alderman again in 1976 in 11th ward	
Robert H. Foss	1847–1852	Republican	Later represented ward again (1854-55)		14th	Amos G. Throop	1849–1853		Later elected alderman again in 1976 in 11th ward	
Robert H. Foss	1847–1852	Republican	Later represented ward again (1854-55)		15th	Amos G. Throop	1849–1853		Later elected alderman again in 1976 in 11th ward	
Charles McDonnell	1852–1854				16th	Amos G. Throop	1849–1853		Later elected alderman again in 1976 in 11th ward	
Charles McDonnell	1852–1854				17th	William Kennedy	1853–1855			
Robert H. Foss	1854–January 1855	Republican	previously represented same ward (1847–1852); resigned in order to serve as a member of the Illinois House of Representatives; later elected alderman again in 1860 in the 5th ward		18th	William Kennedy	1853–1855			
Robert H. Foss	1854–January 1855	Republican	previously represented same ward (1847–1852); resigned in order to serve as a member of the Illinois House of Representatives; later elected alderman again in 1860 in the 5th ward		19th	William Colby	1855–1857		Later elected alderman again in 1860 in 1st ward	
Samuel Myers	1856–1862				20th	William Colby	1855–1857		Later elected alderman again in 1860 in 1st ward	
Samuel Myers	1856–1862				21st	J.M. Kennedy	1857–1861			
Samuel Myers	1856–1862				22nd	J.M. Kennedy	1857–1861			
Samuel Myers	1856–1862				23rd	J.M. Kennedy	1857–1861			
Samuel Myers	1856–1862				24th	J.M. Kennedy	1857–1861			
Samuel Myers	1856–1862				25th	William Baragwanath	1861–1863			
Andrew Schall	1862–1863		Redistricted in 1863 to 1st ward		26th	William Baragwanath	1861–1863			
John T. Edwards	1863–1864		Redistricted from 1st ward		27th	Benjamin E. Gallup	1863–1865			
Samuel McRoy	1864–1866				28th	Benjamin E. Gallup	1863–1865			
Samuel McRoy	1864–1866				29th	H.M. Willmarth	1865–1867			
Alan C. Calkins	1866–1870				30th	H.M. Willmarth	1865–1867			
Alan C. Calkins	1866–1870				31st	Samuel McRoy	1867–1869			
Alan C. Calkins	1866–1870				32nd	Samuel McRoy	1867–1869			
Alan C. Calkins	1866–1870				33rd	John H. McAvoy	1869–1873			
Alan C. Calkins	1866–1870				34th	John H. McAvoy	1869–1873			
Harvey M. Thompson	1870–1872				35th	John H. McAvoy	1869–1873			
Harvey M. Thompson	1870–1872				36th	John H. McAvoy	1869–1873			
George H. Sidwell	1872–1874				37th	John H. McAvoy	1869–1873			
George H. Sidwell	1872–1874				38th	Jesse Spaulding	1873–1876	Republican		
Rensselaer Stone	1874–1876				39th	Jesse Spaulding	1873–1876	Republican		
John Wesley Stewart	1876–1878	Republican			40th	James H. Gilbert	1876–1879			
John Wesley Stewart	1876–1878	Republican			41st	James H. Gilbert	1876–1879			
Herbert E. Mallory	1878–1880				42nd	James H. Gilbert	1876–1879			
Herbert E. Mallory	1878–1880				43rd	Amos Grannis	1879–1881	Republican		
William W. Watson	1880–1882	Republican			44th	Amos Grannis	1879–1881	Republican		
William W. Watson	1880–1882	Republican			45th	Oscar D. Wetherell	1881–1888	Republican	Previously served in 3rd ward	
S.D. Foss	1882–1884				46th	Oscar D. Wetherell	1881–1888	Republican	Previously served in 3rd ward	
S.D. Foss	1882–1884				47th	Oscar D. Wetherell	1881–1888	Republican	Previously served in 3rd ward	
Thomas C. Clarke	1884–1888	Republican	Previously served in the 5th ward		48th	Oscar D. Wetherell	1881–1888	Republican	Previously served in 3rd ward	
Thomas C. Clarke	1884–1888	Republican	Previously served in the 5th ward		49th	Oscar D. Wetherell	1881–1888	Republican	Previously served in 3rd ward	
Thomas C. Clarke	1884–1888	Republican	Previously served in the 5th ward		50th	Oscar D. Wetherell	1881–1888	Republican	Previously served in 3rd ward	
Thomas C. Clarke	1884–1888	Republican	Previously served in the 5th ward		51st	Oscar D. Wetherell	1881–1888	Republican	Previously served in 3rd ward	
John W. Hepburn	1888–1896	Republican			52nd	Harry D. Hammer	1888–1889			
John W. Hepburn	1888–1896	Republican			53rd	Martin B. Madden	1889–1897	Republican		
John W. Hepburn	1888–1896	Republican			54th	Martin B. Madden	1889–1897	Republican		
John W. Hepburn	1888–1896	Republican			55th	Martin B. Madden	1889–1897	Republican		
John W. Hepburn	1888–1896	Republican			56th	Martin B. Madden	1889–1897	Republican		
John W. Hepburn	1888–1896	Republican			57th	Martin B. Madden	1889–1897	Republican		
John W. Hepburn	1888–1896	Republican			58th	Martin B. Madden	1889–1897	Republican		
John W. Hepburn	1888–1896	Republican			59th	Martin B. Madden	1889–1897	Republican		
William S. Jackson	1896–1901	Republican	Redistricted to the 3rd ward in 1901		60th	Martin B. Madden	1889–1897	Republican		
William S. Jackson	1896–1901	Republican	Redistricted to the 3rd ward in 1901		61st	Abraham A. Ballenberg	1897–1899	Democratic		
William S. Jackson	1896–1901	Republican	Redistricted to the 3rd ward in 1901		62nd	Abraham A. Ballenberg	1897–1899	Democratic		
William S. Jackson	1896–1901	Republican	Redistricted to the 3rd ward in 1901		63rd	Milton J. Foreman	1899–1901	Republican	Redistricted to the 3rd ward in 1901	
William S. Jackson	1896–1901	Republican	Redistricted to the 3rd ward in 1901		64th	Milton J. Foreman	1899–1901	Republican	Redistricted to the 3rd ward in 1901	
William E. Kent	1901–1902		Redistricted from 5th ward; died in office		65th	Frank Doubek	1901–1903			
Henry Stuckart	1902–1904		previously represented the 6th ward		66th	Frank Doubek	1901–1903			
Henry Stuckart	1902–1904		previously represented the 6th ward		67th	James M. Dailey	1903–1907			
John A. Richert	1904–1923	Democratic			68th	James M. Dailey	1903–1907			
John A. Richert	1904–1923	Democratic			69th	James M. Dailey	1903–1907			
John A. Richert	1904–1923	Democratic			70th	James M. Dailey	1903–1907			
John A. Richert	1904–1923	Democratic			71st	John W. McNeal	1907–1909			
John A. Richert	1904–1923	Democratic			72nd	John W. McNeal	1907–1909			
John A. Richert	1904–1923	Democratic			73rd	James M. Dailey	1909–1911			
John A. Richert	1904–1923	Democratic			74th	James M. Dailey	1909–1911			
John A. Richert	1904–1923	Democratic			75th	Joseph F. Ryan	1911–1915			
John A. Richert	1904–1923	Democratic			76th	Joseph F. Ryan	1911–1915			
John A. Richert	1904–1923	Democratic			77th	Joseph F. Ryan	1911–1915			
John A. Richert	1904–1923	Democratic			78th	Joseph F. Ryan	1911–1915			
John A. Richert	1904–1923	Democratic			79th	David R. Hickey	1915–December 8, 1918	Democratic	Died in office	
John A. Richert	1904–1923	Democratic			80th	David R. Hickey	1915–December 8, 1918	Democratic	Died in office	
John A. Richert	1904–1923	Democratic			81st	David R. Hickey	1915–December 8, 1918	Democratic	Died in office	
John A. Richert	1904–1923	Democratic			82nd	David R. Hickey	1915–December 8, 1918	Democratic	Died in office	
John A. Richert	1904–1923	Democratic			83rd	Timothy A. Hogan	1919–1923		Continued as alderman after 1923, but redistricted to the 11th ward	
John A. Richert	1904–1923	Democratic			84th	Timothy A. Hogan	1919–1923		Continued as alderman after 1923, but redistricted to the 11th ward	
John A. Richert	1904–1923	Democratic			85th	Timothy A. Hogan	1919–1923		Continued as alderman after 1923, but redistricted to the 11th ward	
John A. Richert	1904–1923	Democratic			86th	Timothy A. Hogan	1919–1923		Continued as alderman after 1923, but redistricted to the 11th ward	

=== 1923 – present ===
Since 1923, wards have been represented by a single alderman. Elections have also been nonpartisan, though officeholders often still publicly affiliate with parties.

In 2021, the state government enacted legislation to change the designation for members of the city council from "aldermen" to "alderpersons".

List of Chicago alderpersons from the 4th Ward since 1923
Image	Alderperson	Party	Term start	Term end	Notes	Ref.
	Ulysses S. Schwartz	Democratic	1923	1925	Previously represented the 3rd ward (1916–1923)	
	Berthold A. Cronson	Republican	1925	December 23, 1937 (died in office)		
	Abraham H. Cohen		1939	1955		
	Claude Holman	Democratic	1955	June 1, 1973	died in office	
	Timothy C. Evans	Democratic	November 27, 1973	1991		
	Toni Preckwinkle	Democratic	April 2, 1991	December 6, 2010	Resigned in order to become president of the Cook County Board of Commissioners	
	Shirley Newsome		2010	2011	Appointed by Mayor Richard M. Daley	
	William D. Burns	Democratic	May 2011	April 2016	Resigned	
	Sophia King	Democratic	April 13, 2016	May 15, 2023		
	Lamont Robinson	Democratic	May 15, 2023	incumbent		

== See also ==
- 50th Ward in Chicago
