= Amasa Tracy =

Union Army officer (1829–1908)

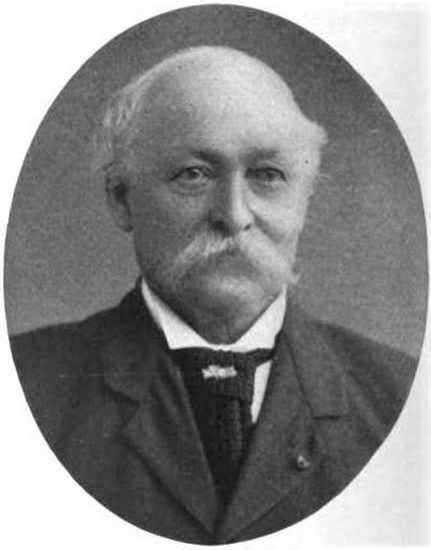
- From the January 1908 edition of The Vermonter magazine
- Born: March 15, 1829; Dover, Maine
- Died: February 26, 1908 (aged 78); Middlebury, Vermont
- Burial place: West Cemetery
- Military career
- Allegiance: United States of America; Union
- Branch: United States Army; Union Army
- Service years: 1861–65
- Rank: Lieutenant Colonel
- Commands: 2nd Vermont Infantry
- Conflicts: American Civil War: Bull Run; Lee's Mills; Williamsburg; Golding's Farm; Battle of Savage's Station; Battle of White Oak Swamp; Crampton's Gap; Antietam; Fredericksburg; Charleston; Battle of Opequon; Winchester; Battle of Fisher's Hill; Mount Jackson; Battle of Cedar Creek; Petersburg, March 25, 1865; Battle of Sayler's Creek
- Awards: Medal of Honor
- Other work: Civil servant

Amasa Sawyer Tracy (March 16, 1829 – February 26, 1908) was a Union Army officer. He was a recipient of the Medal of Honor for gallantry.

== Early life ==
Tracy was born in Dover, Maine, the third child of David and Sarah Fowler Sawyer Tracy.

He attended academy in Farmington, Maine. When he was 15, he moved to Uxbridge, Massachusetts, where he found work. After a short period he went to Vermont. He worked as a carpenter until the Civil War broke out.

== Military career ==
At the age of 32, he enlisted in a company organized in Vergennes, Vermont. It elected him a first lieutenant. The unit was assigned to the Second Regiment, Vermont Volunteer Infantry. He was mustered into the US Army on June 20, 1861.

He immediately left with his regiment for Washington, D. C. In July his regiment was brigaded with the third, fourth and fifth Maine regiments under command of Colonel O. O. Howard. Tracy was appointed provost marshal on Colonel Howard's staff. The first battle in which he participated was that of Bull Run on July 21, 1861.

After the battle, his regiment ultimately became a part of the Vermont Brigade.

In February, 1862, Tracy was promoted to captain of Company H. On April 21, 1864, he was commissioned major of the regiment, and in the same year was commissioned lieutenant colonel. He commanded the regiment until the end of the war.

Tracy was breveted colonel of volunteers for gallantry in the final attack on the rebel line at Petersburg, Virginia, April 2, 1865. He commanded the old Vermont Brigade at the battle of Cedar Creek in the Shenandoah valley. He was the first officer to greet General Sheridan on his arrival from Winchester.

General Sheridan's line of battle was re-formed on Tracy's brigade at Cedar Creek. Tracy was awarded a medal of honor for his service in that engagement.

He was severely wounded in the charge on Marye's Heights, May 3, 1863, and at Cedar Creek October 19, 1864.

Tracy fought in the following battles: Young's Mills, Bull Run, Lee's Mills, Williamsburg, Golding's Farm, Savage Station, White Oak Swamp, Crampton's Gap, Antietam, Fredericksburg, Marye's Heights, Charleston, Opequan, Winchester, Fisher's Hill, Mount Jackson, Cedar Creek, Petersburg, March 25, 1865, and Petersburg, April 2, 1865, and Sayler's Creek. He served in the Civil war a little over four years.

== Postwar ==
Upon his return from the war Tracy owned a store in Middlebury, Vermont. He was postmaster for twelve years. For the following six years he manufactured carriages. He then became a US customs agent in Burlington, Windmill Point, Alburg, Richford, St. Albans and North Troy, Vermont. He lived in North Troy for at least six years as a deputy collector of customs.

The Middlebury Register newspaper noted the following in 1879: "Col. A. S. Tracy, whose coolness and skill saved Will H. Tomlinson and himself from drowning at Lake Dunmore, Decoration day, has been presented by Mr. Tomlinson with a splendid Sharps Creedmore rifle, "Old Reliable," with a fine leather case, ammunition and all the needful apparatus. The stock of the rifle bears a silver plate with an inscription explaining the occasion of the presentation. The rifle is certainly a handsome acknowledgement on the part of Mr. Tomlinson, and just such a one as the gallant colonel can appreciate."

== Family ==
He married Helen Sarah Dow in February, 1849, and they resided in her father's house in Leicester, Vermont. His wife died in August of the same year. Tracy moved to Massachusetts.

Six years later he moved to Middlebury, Vermont. There he married Sarah M. Crane, daughter of Horace Crane, in March, 1858. Six children were born. Four of them survived to adulthood : Horace C., Lena F., Lillian S. and Charles A. Tracy.

Tracy died in Middlebury, Vermont and is buried in West Cemetery.

== Medal of Honor citation ==
Rank and organization: Lieutenant Colonel, 2d Vermont Infantry. Place and date: At Cedar Creek, Va., 19 October 1864. Entered service at: Middlebury, Vt. Birth: Maine. Date of issue: 24 June 1892.

Citation:Took command of and led the brigade in the assault on the enemy's works.

== See also ==
- List of Medal of Honor recipients
- List of American Civil War Medal of Honor recipients: T–Z
