= 1859 Chicago mayoral election =

Chicago mayoral election, 1859
- March 1, 1859
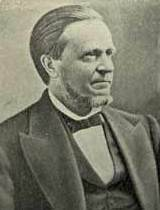

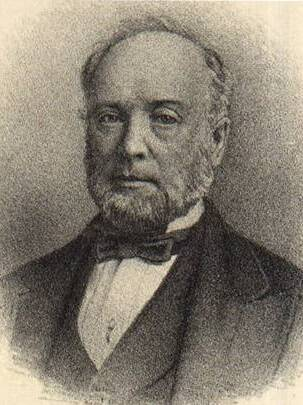
Candidate	John Charles Haines	Marcus D. Gilman
Party	Republican	Democratic
Popular vote	8,587	7,728
Percentage	52.63%	47.37%
Mayor before election
John Charles Haines
Republican
Elected mayor
John Charles Haines
Republican

In the 1859 Chicago mayoral election, incumbent Republican John Charles Haines defeated Democratic challenger Marcus D. Gilman.

The election was held on March 1.

== Results ==
1859 Chicago mayoral election
Party	Candidate	Votes	%
Republican	John Charles Haines (incumbent)	8,587	52.63
Democratic	Marcus D. Gilman	7,728	47.37
Turnout		16,315	
