= 2nd Vermont Infantry Regiment =

- Active: June 20, 1861 to July 15, 1865
- Disbanded: July 15, 1865
- Allegiance: United States; Union
- Branch: United States Army; Union Army
- Type: Infantry
- Size: 1,811
- Engagements: First Battle of Bull Run; Battle of Williamsburg; Battle of Savage's Station; Battle of Antietam; Battle of Fredericksburg; Battle of Salem Church; Battle of Gettysburg; Battle of the Wilderness; Battle of Spotsylvania Court House; Battle of Cold Harbor; Third Battle of Winchester; Battle of Cedar Creek

Commanders
- Colonel: Henry Whiting

Insignia
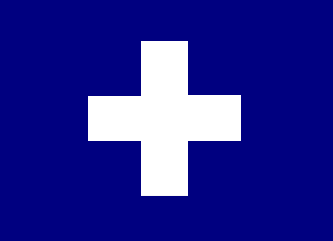
- 2nd Brigade (Vermont Brigade), 2nd Division, VI Corps (Union Army), Army of the Potomac/Army of the Shenandoah (Union)

The 2nd Vermont Infantry Regiment was a three years' infantry regiment in the Union Army during the American Civil War. It served in the eastern theater, predominantly in the VI Corps, Army of the Potomac, from June 1861 to July 1865. It was a member of the famous Vermont Brigade.

== History ==
In July 1861, the United States Congress authorized President Abraham Lincoln to call out 500,000 men, to serve for three years unless sooner discharged. The 2nd Vermont Infantry was the first of the three years regiments from the state placed in the field as a result of this call, and it served longer in the service than all but one other Vermont unit, the 7th Vermont Infantry. It was organized from militia companies from Brattleboro, Burlington, Castleton, Fletcher, Ludlow, Montpelier, Tunbridge, Vergennes and Waterbury.

The colonelcy of the regiment was initially offered to Israel B. Richardson, a native of Vermont, but he had just accepted command of the 1st Michigan Infantry. Richardson recommended a classmate from the United States Military Academy, Henry H. Whiting, and he was commissioned by Governor Erastus Fairbanks on June 6, 1861. George J. Stannard, of St. Albans, was appointed lieutenant colonel, and Charles H. Joyce, a young lawyer from Northfield, was appointed major.

The regiment rendezvoused at Burlington, and was mustered into United States service on June 20. Four days later, the regiment left for Washington, D.C., arriving on June 26. It was initially brigaded with three Maine regiments under command of Colonel Oliver O. Howard. On July 21, the brigade participated in the First Battle of Bull Run. The regiment suffered 68 casualties: 2 killed, 35 wounded and 31 missing.

August 12, 1861, the regiment transferred to Chain Bridge, where it went into camp with the 3rd Vermont Infantry, 6th Maine Infantry and 33rd New York Infantry. In September, the 4th, 5th and 6th Vermont regiments joined with the 2nd and 3rd to form the famous "Old Vermont Brigade," under the command of newly promoted Brigadier General William Farrar Smith, previously commander of the 3rd Vermont Infantry. Smith was soon assigned command of the division of which the Vermont Brigade was a part, and William T. H. Brooks, a native of Ohio, but the son of a Vermonter, assumed command.

The history of the regiment from this point on is essentially that of the Vermont Brigade, except for numerous personnel changes.

Colonel Whiting resigned on February 9, 1863, and was replaced by James H. Walbridge, who commanded the regiment until he resigned on April 1, 1864. He was replaced by Newton Stone, who was killed in action at the Battle of the Wilderness, on May 5, 1864. His replacement, John S. Tyler, had been wounded on May 5, and died of his wounds on May 23. Amasa Tracy, his replacement, commanded the regiment until it was disbanded.

Lieutenant Colonel George J. Stannard was promoted to the colonelcy of the 9th Vermont Infantry on May 21, 1862, and later commanded the 2nd Vermont Brigade, which garnered honors for its participation in the repulse of Pickett's Charge at the Battle of Gettysburg on July 3, 1863.

The original members of the regiment, who did not reenlist, were mustered out of the service on June 29, 1864. One year recruits and others whose term of service was due to expire prior to October 1, 1865, were mustered out on June 19, 1865. The remaining officers and men mustered out of service on July 15.

== Regimental staff ==
2nd Vermont Infantry Regimental Commanders and Field Staff

Commanders

- Col. Henry Whiting, St. Clair, MI - Commissioned June 6, 1861. Resigned February 9, 1863.
- Col. James H. Walbridge, Bennington, VT - Commissioned Captain Co. A, promoted to Major, May 21, 1862, to Lt. Col. January 8, 1863, Col. February 9, 1863, and resigned April 1, 1864.
- Col. Newton Stone, Bennington, VT - Commissioned 1st Lt. Co. A, promoted Capt. Co. I, January 22, 1862, to Major January 8, 1863, to Lt. Col. February 9, 1863, Col. April 1, 1864, and killed in action May 5, 1864.
- Col. John S. Tyler, Brattleboro, VT - Commissioned 1st Lt. Co. C, promoted Capt. Co. C, January 23, 1862, to Major February 9, 1863, to Lt. Col. April 2, 1864, acting Col. May 5, 1864, and died of wounds May 23, 1864, received in battle May 5, 1864.
- Col. Amasa Tracy, Middlebury, VT - Commissioned 1st Lt. Co. K, promoted Capt. Co. H, January 24, 1862, to Major April 2, 1864, to Lt. Col. June 17, 1864, breveted Col. April 2, 1865 for gallantry at Pettersburg VA, and wounded in action May 3, 1863, and October 19, 1864. Mustered out July 15th 1865.

Lieutenant Colonels

- Lieut. Col. George J. Stannard, St. Albans, VT - Commissioned Lieutenant Colonel June 6, 1861, promoted to Col. of the 9th Vermont Infantry May 21, 1862.
- Lieut. Col. Charles H. Joyce, Northfield, VT - Commissioned Major June 6, 1861, resigned January 6, 1863.
- Lieut. Col. Newton Stone - (See Colonel)
- Lieut. Col. John S. Tyler - (See Colonel)
- Lieut. Col. Amasa S. Tracy - (See Colonel)
- Lieut. Col. Enoch E. Johnson, Castleton, VT - Commissioned 2nd Lt. Co. B, promoted 1st Lt. Co. B, September 2, 1861, to Capt. Co. D. January 25, 1862, to Major, June 17, 1864, and brevetted Lt. Col. October 19th, 1864 for gallantry in al the actions since Battle of Cold Harbor, and especially at Battle of Cedar Creek, Mustered out July 15th 1865.

Majors

- Maj. Charles H. Joyce - (See Lieutenant Colonel)
- Maj. Newton Stone -(See Colonel)
- Maj. John S. Tyler -(See Colonel)
- Maj. Amasa S. Tracy -(See Colonel)
- Maj. Erastus G. Ballou, Boston, MA - Enlisted 1st Sergeant Co. I, May 7, 1861, promoted to Sergt.-Maj. Oct, 14, 1861, Commissioned 1st Lt. Co. K, January 27, 1862, promoted to Capt. Co. K. August 4, 1862, Brevetted Major, August 1, 1864, for gallantry in the Battle of the Wilderness and subsequent engagement. Wounded May 3, 1863, July 10, 1863, May 5, 1864, and April 2, 1865. Mustered out July 15th, 1865

Adjutants

- 1st Lieut. Guilford S. Ladd, Bennington, VT - Commissioned June 11, 1861, Resigned July 17, 1862.
- 1st Lieut. Francis M. Edgerton, Poultney, VT - Enlisted Sergeant Co.B, May 9, 1861, Commissioned 2nd Lieutenant Co. F. January 25, 1862, Mustered out June 29, 1864.
- 1st Lieut. Orman P. Ray, Essex, VT - Enlisted Private Co. G August 30, 1862, Promoted Sergt-Maj. November 1, 1864, Commissioned December 24, 1864 Mustered out June 19, 1865

Quartermasters

- 1st Lieut. Perley P. Pitkin, Montpelier, VT - Commissioned June 6, 1861, Promoted Captain and Assistant Quartermaster of U.S. Volunteers February 19, 1862.
- 1st Lieut. Lauriston L. Stone, Stowe, VT - Enlisted Commissary-Sergeant. June 6, 1861, Promoted Q.M.-Sergt. Commissioned April 3, 1862. Taken prisoner October 26, 1863, pardoned December 10, 1864. Mustered out April 16, 1865.

Surgeons

- Newton H. Ballou, Burlington, VT - Commissioned June 11, 1861, Resigned December 18, 1862
- William J. Sawin, Chicopee Falls, MA - Transferred from 10th Massachusetts Infantry Regiment as Priv. to Co. E. 3rd Vermont Infantry Regiment, Promoted Asst.-Surg. in the 2nd VT Regt. June 21, 1862. Wounded and taken prisoner June 29, 1862. Pardoned July 22, 1862. Commissioned December 18, 1862. Mustered out June 19, 1864
- Melvin J. Hyde, Isla La Mott, VT - Commissioned Assistant-Surgeon August 1, 1864. Mustered out July 15, 1865

Assistant-Surgeons

- Benjamin W. Carpenter, Burlington, VT - Commissioned June 11, 1861, promoted Surg. 9th Regt. VT. Vols. June 21, 1862.
- William J. Sawin - (See Surgeon)
- Augustus A. Atwood, Sharon, VT - Commissioned Assistant-Surgeon September 22, 1862. Resigned June 25, 1863.
- Luman A. Noyes, Tunbridge, VT - Commissioned Assistant-Surgeon April 14, 1863. Resigned May 27, 1863.
- Melvin J. Hyde - (See Surgeon)
- Edwin R. Brush, Cambridge, VT - Drafted Private Co. H July 17, 1863, Commissioned Asst.-Surg. October 15, 1863. Mustered out July 15, 1865

Chaplains

- Claudius B. Smith, Brandon, VT - Commissioned Chaplain June 6, 1861. Resigned July 8, 1862.
- Durrell W. Dayton, Middlebury, VT. - Commissioned Chaplain August 18th, 1862. Resigned January 6th, 1863

== Affiliations, battle honors, detailed service, and casualties ==
=== Organizational affiliation ===
Its assignments are as follows:

- Attached to Howard's Brigade, Heintzelman's Division, McDowell's Army of Northeast Virginia, to August, 1861
- Smith's Brigade, Division of the Potomac, to October 1861
- Attached to Brooks' Brigade, Smith's Division, Army of the Potomac (AoP), to March, 1862
- 2nd Brigade, 2nd Division, VI Corps, AoP, to, to July 1864
- 2nd Brigade, 2nd Division, VI Corps, Army of the Shenandoah, Middle Military Division to July 1865.

=== List of battles ===
The official list of battles in which the regiment bore a part:

- Battle of First Bull Run - July 21, 1861
- Battle of Warwick Creek - April 6, 1862
- Battle at Lee's Mills - April 16, 1862
- Battle of Williamsburg -| May 5, 1862
- Battle of Garnett's & Golding's Farm - June 26, 1862
- Battle of Savage's Station - June 29, 1862
- Battle of White Oak Swamp - June 30, 1862
- Battle of Crampton's Gap - September 14, 1862
- Battle of Antietam - September 17, 1862
- Battle of Fredericksburg - December 13, 1862
- Battle of Marye's Heights - May 3, 1863
- Battle of Salem Church - May 4, 1863
- Second Battle of Fredericksburg - June 5, 1863
- Battle of Gettysburg - July 3, 1863
- Battle of Funkstown - July 10, 1863
- Second Battle of Rappahannock Station - November 7, 1863
- Battle of the Wilderness - May 5–10, 1864
- Battle of Spotsylvania - May 10–18, 1864
- Battle of Cold Harbor - June 1–12, 1864
- Second Battle of Petersburg - June 18, 1864
- Battle of Reams' Station - June 29, 1864
- Fort Stevens (Washington, D.C.) - July 11, 1864
- Battle of Charlestown - August 21, 1864
- Battle of Opequon (Gilbert's Ford) - September 13, 1864
- Battle of Winchester (Opequon) - September 19, 1864
- Battle of Fisher's Hill - September 21–22, 1864
- Battle of Cedar Creek - October 19, 1864
- Siege of Petersburg - March 25, 1865
- Third Battle of Petersburg - April 2, 1865
- Battle of Sailor's Creek - | April 6, 1865

=== Detailed Service ===
The 2nd Vermont's detailed service is as follows

==== 1861 ====
- Left state for Washington DC, July 24
- Arrived in Washington, July 26
- Advance on Manassas, Va., July 16–21
- Battle of Bull Run, Va., July 21
- Scout to Great Falls August 20–25
- Skirmish near Lewinsville September 11 (Cos. "A" and "F.")
- Reconnaissance to Lewinsville September 23 (Cos. "A" and "F")
- Expedition to Munson's Hill September 28
- Reconnaissance to Vienna October 17
- Reconnaissance to Peacock Hill November 9
- Duty in the Defences of Washington till March, 1862.

==== 1862 ====
- Moved to Alexandria, VA, March 10, 1862
- Moved to Fortress Monroe VA, March 23–24.
- Action at Young's Mill April 4.
- Siege of Yorktown April 5-May 4.
- Lee's Mills April 16.
- Battle of Williamsburg May 5.
- Seven Days before Richmond June 25-July 1.
  - Garnett's Farm June 27.
  - Savage Station June 29.
  - White Oak Swamp Bridge June 30.
  - Malvern Hill July 1.
- At Harrison's Landing till August 16.
- Moved to Fortress Monroe, thence to Alexandria August 16–24.
- Maryland Campaign September–October 1862.
  - Crampton's Pass September 14.
  - Battle of Antietam September 16–17.
- At Hagerstown, MD, September 26 to October 29.
- Movement to Falmouth, VA October 29-November 19.
- Battle of Fredericksburg December 12–15.

==== 1863 ====
- Burnside's Second Campaign, "Mud March," January 20–24, 1863.
- Chancellorsville Campaign April 27-May 6.
  - Operations at Franklin's Crossing April 29-May 6.
  - Maryes Heights, Fredericksburg. May 3.
  - Salem Heights May 3–4.
  - Banks' Ford May 4.
- Franklin's Crossing June 5–13.
- Battle of Gettysburg. Pa., July 2–4.
- Funkstown, Md., July 10–13.
- Ordered to New York City August 14, and duty there util September 13.
- Moved to Alexandria, thence to Fairfax Court House September 13–17
- Moved to Culpeper Courthouse September 22.
- Bristoe Campaign October 9–22.
- Advance to the Rappahannock November 7–8.
  - Rappahannock Station November 7
- Mine Run Campaign November 26-December 2.

==== 1864 ====
- Overland Campaign May 3 – June 15.
  - Battle of the Wilderness May 5–7.
  - Battle of Spotsylvania Court House May 11–12,
    - "Bloody Angle," Assault on the Salient, May 12.
  - Battle of North Anna May 23–26.
  - Line of the Pamunkey May 26–28.
  - Totopotomoy May 28–31.
  - Battle of Cold Harbor June 1–12.
  - Battle of Jerusalem Plank Road June 22–23.
- Moved to Washington, D. C., July 9–11
- Repulse of Early's attack on Fort Stevens July 11–12
- Non-veterans mustered out July 27, 1864.
- Sheridan's Shenandoah Valley Campaign August 7-November 28
  - Near Charlestown August 21–22
  - Battle of Opequan, Winchester, September 19
  - Fisher's Hill September 22
  - Battle of Cedar Creek October 19
- At Strasburg to November 9
- At Kernstown till December 9
- Moved to Petersburg, December 9–12.

==== 1865 ====
- Siege of Petersburg December 12, 1864, to April 2, 1865.
- Fort Fisher, before Petersburg, March 25, 1865.
- Appomattox Campaign March 28-April 9.
- Assault on and fall of Petersburg April 2.
- Sailor's Creek April 6.
- Appomattox Court House April 9.
- Surrender of Lee and his army.
- At Farmville and Burkesville Junction till April 23.
- March to Danville April 23–27, and duty there till May 18.
- Moved to Manchester May 18, thence marched to Washington, D. C, May 24-June 2.
- Corps Review June 8.
- Mustered out June 29, 1865.

=== Casualties/Discharges/Promotions ===
During the course of the war, a total of 1,858 men served in the 3rd Vermont Infantry with 866 original recruits and 992 gains from recruiting and transfer. Of that number, the unit lost during its term of service: 223 men were killed and mortally wounded, (Note: 139 KIA, 84 Mortally wounded) 3 died from accident, 22 died in Confederate prisons, 1 executed, and 136 died from disease; for a total loss of 385 men. The 3rd also had 8 men promoted and transferred to other regiments, 446 honorably discharged, 24 dishonorably discharged, 170 deserted, 5 finally unaccounted for, 120 Transferred to Veteran Reserve Corps and other organizations; combined with deaths this meant the regiment lost 773 of their number.

== Medal of Honor ==
Five members of the regiment were awarded the Medal of Honor.

- Captain Dayton P. Clarke, Company F, was credited with "distinguished conduct in a desperate hand-to-hand fight while commanding the regiment," at the Battle of Spotsylvania, on May 12, 1864.
- Sergeant Ephraim W. Harrington, Company G, "carried the colors to the top of the heights and almost to the muzzle of the enemy's guns," at the Second Battle of Fredericksburg, on May 3, 1863.
- Private William W. Noyes, Company F, "standing upon the top of the breastworks, [he] deliberately took aim and fired no less than 15 shots into the enemy's lines, but a few yards away," at Spotsylvania, on May 12, 1864.
- 2nd Lieutenant Augustus J. Robbins, Company B, "while voluntarily serving as a staff officer successfully withdrew a regiment across and around a severely exposed position to the rest of the command; was severely wounded," at Spotsylvania, on May 12, 1864.
- Lieutenant Colonel Amasa S. Tracy, serving with Lieutenant H. E. Farrel "took command of and led the brigade in the assault on the enemy's works," at the Battle of Cedar Creek, on October 19, 1864.

== See also ==
- Vermont Brigade
- Vermont in the Civil War
