= Dora V. Wheelock =

American temperance activist, writer

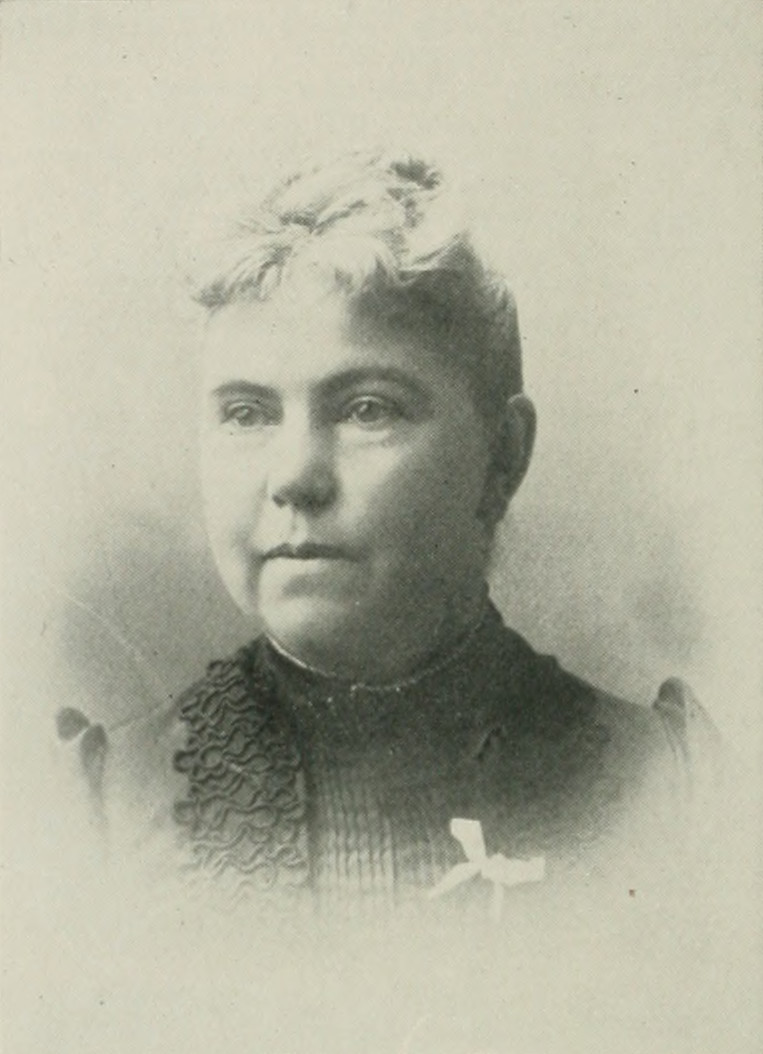
- Photo in A Woman of the Century
- Born: Pedora Velina Palmer; August 26, 1847; Calais, Vermont, U.S.
- Died: February 3, 1923 (aged 75); Loveland, Colorado, U.S.
- Other name: "Dora"
- Education: high school of Berlin, Wisconsin, U.S.
- Occupations: activist; writer
- Spouse: Oren Newell Wheelock (m. 1865)
- Children: 5
- Writing career
- Subject: temperance movement

Dora V. Wheelock (née, Palmer; August 26, 1847 – February 3, 1923) was an American activist and writer involved in the temperance movement. She served as president of the Nebraska state branch of the Woman's Christian Temperance Union (WCTU), the Nebraska state superintendent of press work, and a reporter for The Union Signal for Nebraska. She wrote much including for Youth's Companion. Wheelock was also elected to the board of education of Beatrice, Nebraska.

== Early life and education ==
Pedora (nickname, "Dora") Velina Palmer was born in Calais, Vermont, August 26, 1847. Her parents were of New England background, with French ancestry. Her great-grandfather was a captain in the American Revolutionary War. Her father, a Christian minister, died when she was three years old, leaving a family of small children, of whom she was the youngest. She became involved in church and Sunday school work at the age of thirteen.

In 1865, Wheelock graduated from the high school of Berlin, Wisconsin.

== Career ==
On July 20, 1865, in Berlin, Wisconsin, she married Oren Newell Wheelock (1841–1930), a merchant of that city, who became a State Banker. They lived first in Iowa, and then in Wisconsin, till 1873, when they settled in Beatrice, Nebraska, where Oren went on to become mayor.

Wheelock was interested in church, foreign missionary and schoolwork. From 1883, she became involved in the WCTU. In 1885, she compiled a pamphlet of 216 pages, constituting the 20th Annual WCTU Report of Nebraska. She served for several years as the president of the local WCTU branch and three years as president of Gage County, Nebraska's WCTU branch. In 1899, she was state vice-president.

In the spring of 1889, Wheelock was elected to a position on the board of education of Beatrice. She served as State superintendent of press work, and reporter for the Union Signal for Nebraska. She wrote much; her articles appeared in the Youth's Companion, Union Signal, and various other publications. Wheelock was a strong advocate of woman's enfranchisement, though not known as a special worker in the field. She championed the cause of woman's progress.

In 1906, after having served as president of the Nebraska state WCTU for the past five years, she removed to Loveland, Colorado.

== Personal life ==
Wheelock's hobbies included music, both vocal and instrumental; she was also a painter.

The Wheelocks had three sons, Oren (b. 1866), Charles (b. 1876), and Herbert (1880–1880); and two daughters, Della (b. 1870) and Mary (1874–1875). In May 1917, it was reported that Wheelock was critically ill at her home in Loveland.

Pedora Velina Palmer Wheelock died February 3, 1923, at her home in Loveland. Funeral services were held at Beatrice's Centenary Methodist Episcopal Church. Burial was held in the Beatrice cemetery.
