= National Civil Service Reform League =

American non-profit organization

The National Civil Service Reform League was a non-profit organization in the United States founded in 1881 for the purpose of investigating the efficiency of the civil service. Among its founders were George William Curtis, chairman of the first United States Civil Service Commission, and Dorman B. Eaton, principal author of the Pendleton Civil Service Act (1883) and first chairman of the reconstituted commission. Largely through its influence many important civil service measures were passed. During World War I, its work was especially valuable in securing civil service efficiency as a factor in military success. After the signing of the armistice in November 1918, the League effected an investigation into the sources of inefficiency in the civil service at Washington, and recommended the reorganization of the Civil Service Commission.

It became an advocate for civil rights in the 1960s, promoting "good government" which it defined as merit-based hiring and promotion of government employees at the municipal, state and federal level.

== See also ==
- Pendleton Civil Service Reform Act
