= John M. Gilman =

American politician

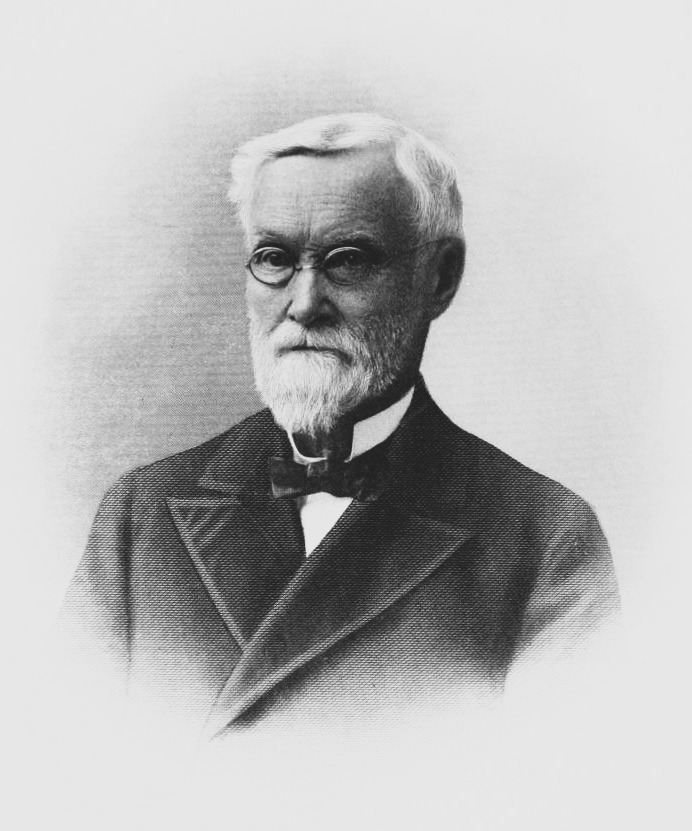
- Gilman c. 1906

Member of the Vermont General Assembly
- In office 1874

Member of the Minnesota House of Representatives
- In office 1865 – 1866; 1869 – 1870; 1870 – 1871; 1877 – 1878

Member of the Ohio House of Representatives
- In office 1849 – 1850

Personal details
- Born: September 7, 1824 Calais, Vermont, U.S.
- Died: September 26, 1906 (aged 82) Saint Paul, Minnesota, U.S.
- Resting place: Oakland Cemetery, Saint Paul, Minnesota, U.S.
- Other political affiliations: Democrat
- Relations: Marcus D. Gilman (brother); Dorman Bridgman Eaton (step-brother)

John Melvin Gilman (September 7, 1824 – September 26, 1906) was an American politician and lawyer.

Born in Calais, Vermont, Gilman was admitted to the Vermont bar in 1846. He moved to New Lisbon, Ohio in 1846 and practiced law. He served in the Ohio House of Representatives in 1849 and 1850. In 1857, Gilman moved to Minnesota Territory and settled in Saint Paul. He continued to practice law. Gilman was the Democratic Party nominee for a U.S. House seat in 1859 and again in 1863, losing to William Windom and Ignatius Donnelly. Gilman served in the Minnesota House of Representatives in 1865, 1869, 1870 and 1877. Gilman died at a hospital in Saint Paul, Minnesota from a fall caused by a stroke at his home, he is buried in Oakland Cemetery in Saint Paul.

== Family ==
Gilman was the son of Dr. John Taylor Gilman (1791-1825) and his wife Ruth Curtis (1799-1865). His mother remarried in 1829 to Nathaniel Eaton (1791-1878), who was later a Vermont state senator and a judge. Gilman's older brother Marcus (1820-1889) became a successful Chicago merchant; after returning to Vermont in 1871, he served in the Vermont General Assembly in 1874 and compiled a bibliography of Vermont history. He was an unsuccessful Democratic candidate for mayor of Chicago in 1859. One of Gilman's step-brothers was Dorman Bridgman Eaton (1823-1899), a lawyer prominent in civil service reform.

Gilman married Anna G. Cornwell in 1857. Their two oldest children, John (b. 1859) and Marcus (b. 1860) died in a boating accident on the Mississippi River in 1877. A third, Hays (1862-3) died in infancy. Jesse (1864-1944) married Lucius Pond Ordway (1862-1948), who became a prominent St. Paul businessman. Catherine "Kit", born 1868, married a man named James Potter Elmer.
