= Adamant Music School =

Piano school in Vermont, US

The Adamant Music School

Location
- Haggett Rd., Adamant, Vermont; 44.330084°N 72.504283°W

Information
- Established: 1942
- Website: http://www.adamant.org

The Adamant Music School is a piano school located in Adamant, Vermont.

Founded in 1942 by pianist Edwine Behre, journalist/poet Alice Mary Kimball and photographer Harry Godfrey, the school has operated continuously as a summer retreat to some of the world's most accomplished and respected pianists - both as students and as instructors.
