= Adamant, Vermont =

- Unincorporated community
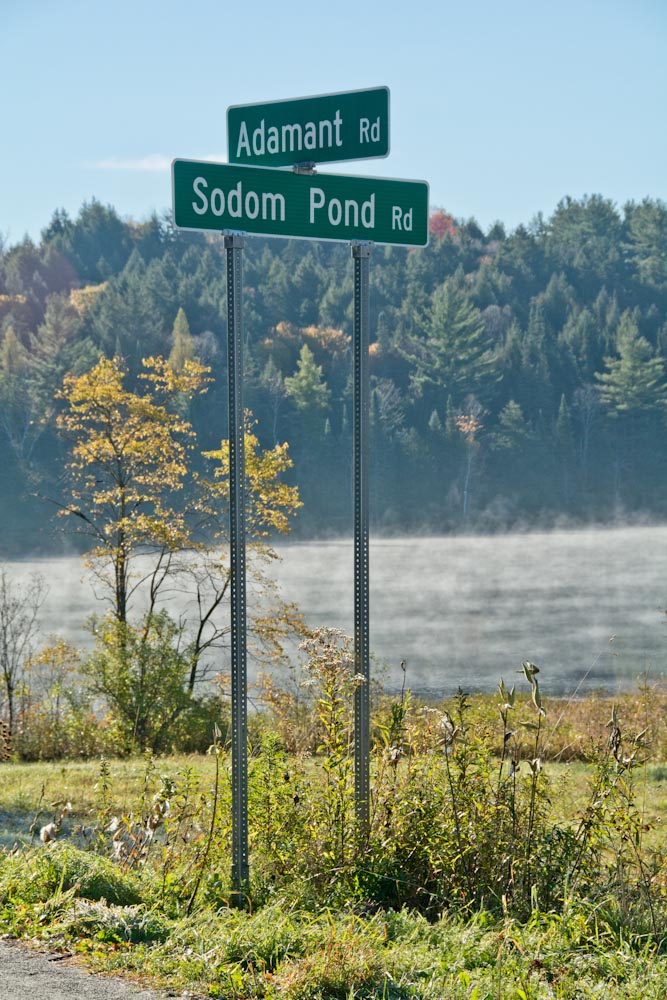
- Adamant signpost

- Location within Vermont Location within the United States
- Coordinates: 44°19′45″N 72°30′10″W
- Country: United States
- State: Vermont
- County: Washington
- Renamed: 1905
- Elevation: 1,043 ft (318 m)
- Time zone: UTC-5 (EST)
  - Summer (DST): UTC-4 (EDT)
- ZIP code: 05640
- Area code: 802
- GNIS feature ID: 1456106

Adamant is a small, unincorporated community in the town of Calais in Washington County, Vermont, United States, in the central part of Vermont.

The village is situated on the town line between Calais to the north and East Montpelier to the south. There is no true boundary to define the village, and as such, there is great debate as to what constitutes residence. This is, however, purely theoretical as there is no legal, governmental, or commercial status associated with residence. The debate has given rise to the common aphorism that "Adamant is a state of mind".

The village was originally known as Sodom from its inception prior to the mid-19th century as a granite quarry-town.

Local lore tells the story of a preacher slamming his fist on the pulpit proclaiming, "I am adamant that we change the name of this town!" In 1905, residents petitioned the state legislature for a name change to "Adamant."

The quarries remained an active part of the Vermont granite industry well into the mid-20th century. The small, rural village has no paved roads or traffic lights.

The village center is the member-owned Adamant Co-op, a general store and post office located at the junction of Haggett, Quarry, Center and Sodom Pond Roads. Founded in 1935, it is the state's oldest co-operative.

Perhaps the village's most notable inclusion is the Adamant Music School, a summer-long piano and musicology school founded in 1942. Adamant is also home to the Quarryworks Theater, a community theater set on the grounds of Adamant's largest quarry.
