= Louise Andrews Kent =

American writer

- Born: Louise Andrews; May 25, 1886; Brookline, Massachusetts, U.S.
- Died: August 6, 1969 (aged 83)
- Occupation: Writer
- Spouse: Ira Rich Kent
- Children: Elizabeth, Hollister, Rosamond
- Writing career
- Pen name: Theresa Tempest; Mrs. Appleyard
- Genres: children's literature non-fiction

Louise Andrews Kent (May 25, 1886 – August 6, 1969) was an American writer. She was born in Brookline, Massachusetts, in 1886 and graduated, in 1909, from Simmons College School of Library Science, where she was president of her senior class and editor of the college paper.

She became a newspaper columnist and writer of children's literature, and also cookbooks. She wrote a newspaper column, Theresa’s Tea Table, in the Boston Traveller under the pen name of Theresa Tempest and later authored a series of cookbooks as Mrs. Appleyard. Kent, also as Mrs. Appleyard, wrote a quarterly feature on food for Vermont Life magazine for many years.

The Vermont Historical Society, of which Kent was a trustee during the 1950s, maintains a collection of research notes, manuscript and typescript drafts and galley proofs of her work.

== Family ==
Louise Andrews Kent married Ira Rich Kent (1876–1945) in 1912. The couple had three children and maintained residences in both Brookline and Calais, Vermont. In 1959, Kent, by then a widow, moved permanently to Calais.

Kent's father, Walter Edward Andrews, immigrated to the United States after the American Civil War. Kent's mother, Mary Sophronia Edgerly, grew up in New England and attended private schools. She was very athletic and participated in tennis, shooting, swimming, riding, and golfing. In fact, Edgerly won the first women's golf tournament ever played in the United States. The tournament took place at a Brookline country club. Edgerly died in 1899 of influenza when Louise Andrews Kent was just 13 years old.

== Bibliography ==
Books authored by Louise Andrews Kent include:

=== Novels ===
- (1939) Paul Revere Square
- The Terrace
- (1945) Country Mouse

=== Children's fiction ===
- (1931) Douglas of Porcupine
- (1935) He went with Marco Polo: A Story of Venice and Cathay
- (1938) He went with Vasco da Gama
- (1940) He went with Christopher Columbus
- (1943) He went with Magellan
- (1959) He went with Champlain
- (1961) He went with Drake
- (1967) He went with Hannibal
- The Red Rajah
- (1932) Two Children of Tyre

=== Cookbooks ===
- (1953) ...with Kitchen Privileges
- (1957) The Summer Kitchen
- (1962) The Winter Kitchen
- (1965) Vermont Year Round Cookbook
- (1974) Mrs. Appleyard’s Kitchen Omnibus

=== Other non-fiction ===
- (1942) "Mrs. Appleyard's Kitchen"
- (1948) Village Greens of New England
- (1955) The Brookline Trunk
- (1968) Mrs. Appleyard and I
