= Daniel Brainard =

American surgeon (1812–1866)

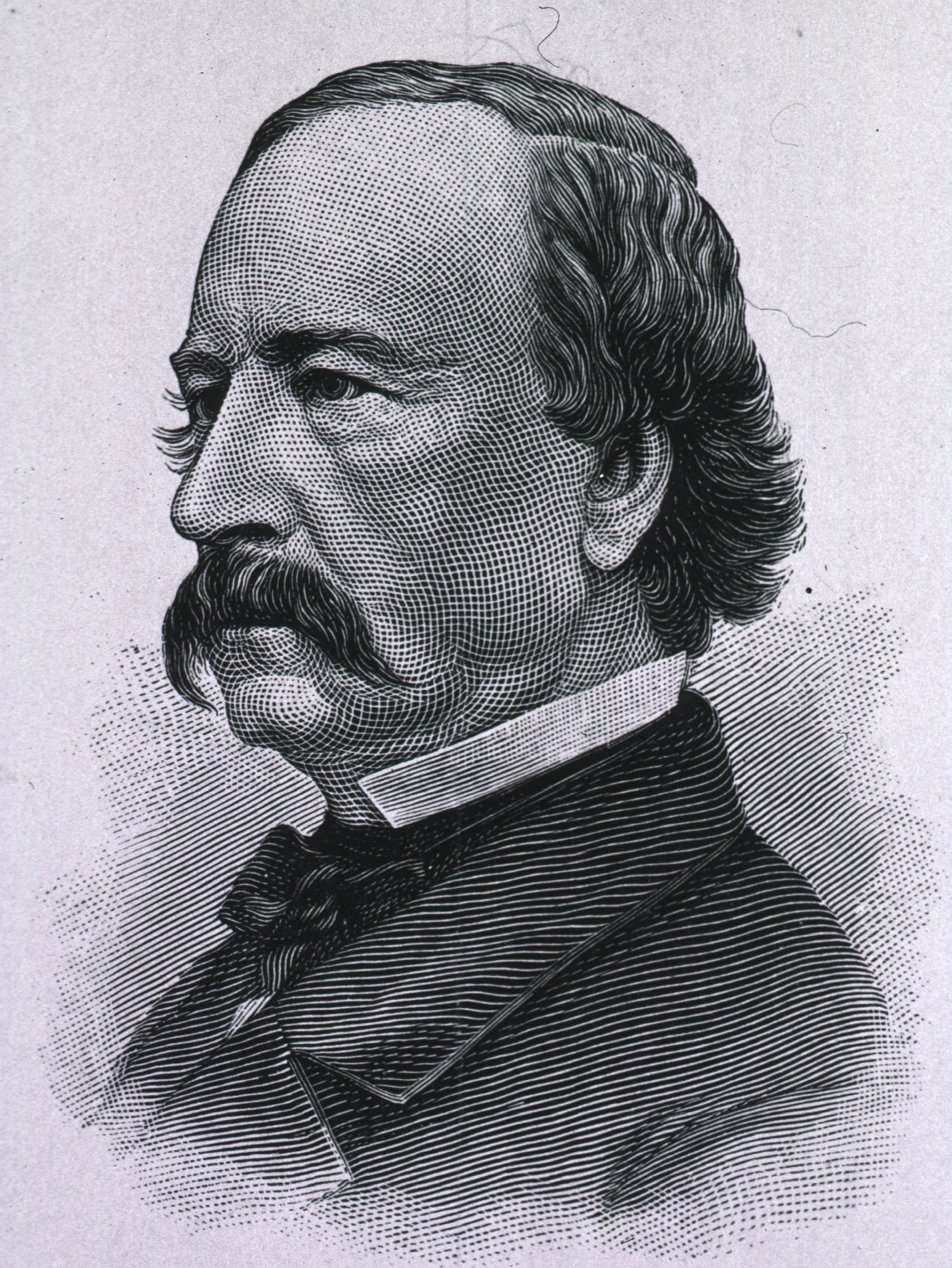

Daniel Brainard (May 15, 1812 – October 10, 1866) was a Chicago-based surgeon and founder of Rush Medical College.

== Personal life ==
Brainard came to Chicago in 1836, at the age of 24, and immediately set up a medical practice, soon after which he applied to the Illinois state legislature for a charter for what was to become Rush Medical College. The charter was granted on March 2, 1837, two days before the city of Chicago was incorporated. He chose the name for the school after Benjamin Rush, the only physician with medical training to sign the Declaration of Independence.

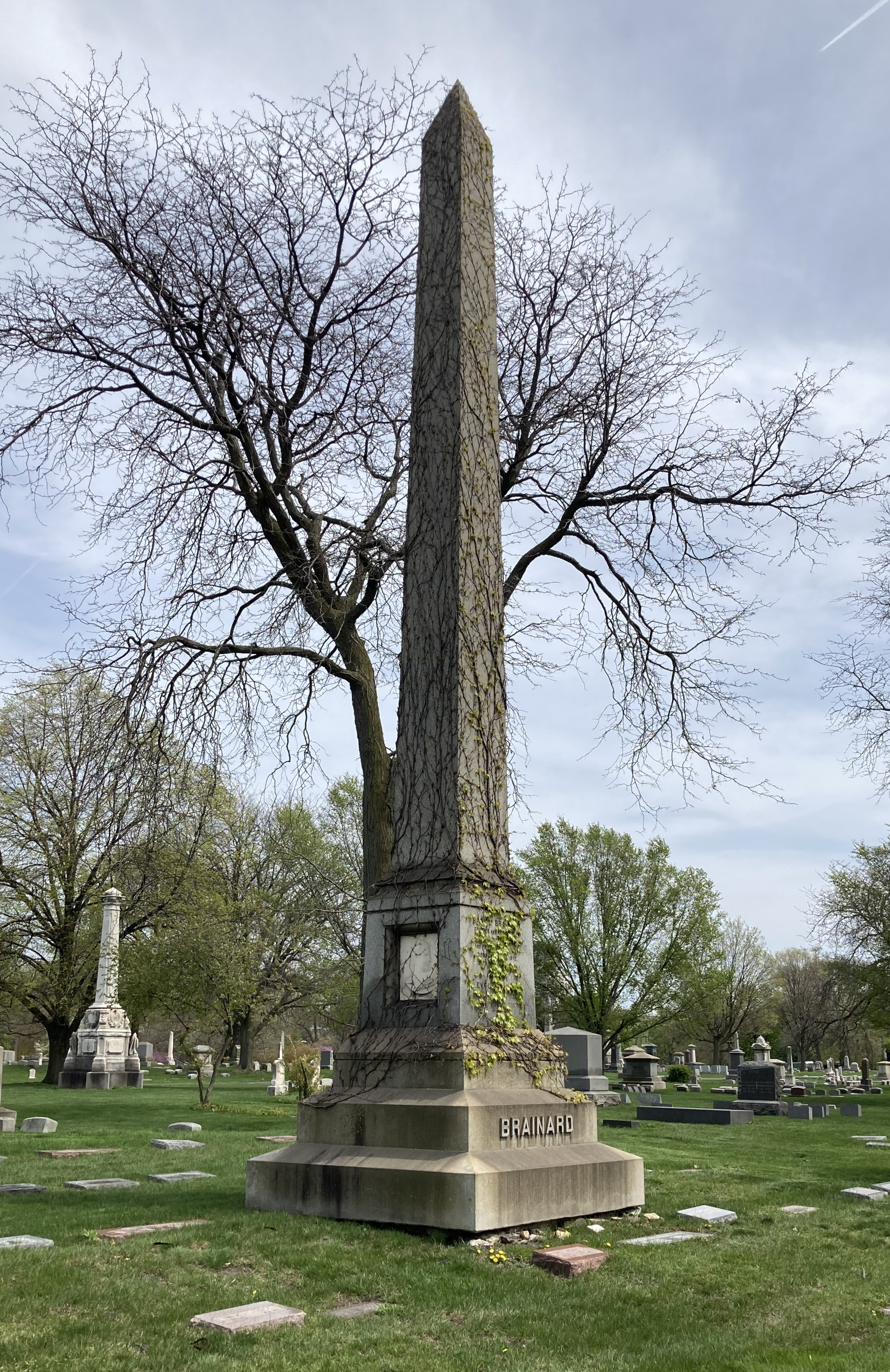
Brainard's grave at Graceland Cemetery

Brainard died from cholera in Chicago on October 10, 1866, and was buried at Graceland Cemetery.

== Career ==
Brainard made his reputation in Chicago by successfully amputating at the hip joint the leg of an injured canal worker, the first such operation in the United States. His other accomplishments include being the city's first surgeon, editor of the Illinois Medical and Surgical Journal, proponent of the first general hospital for the city and then the first county hospital. He was also an organizer for the county and state medical societies.

Brainard was the president and professor of surgery at Rush from its founding until his death at age 54 of cholera, a subject he had lectured on a few hours before he himself succumbed to the disease.

Brainard ran for mayor of Chicago in 1858.

By 1897, Rush Medical College was the largest medical school in America. Rush Medical College is now part of Rush University and its affiliated medical center Rush University Medical Center, formerly Rush-Presbyterian-St. Luke's Medical Center.

== See also ==
- Rush University Medical Center

Party political offices
Preceded by Benjamin Carver	Democratic nominee for Mayor of Chicago; 1857	Succeeded by Marcus D. Gilman
