= Kents Corner Historic District =

Historic district in Vermont, United States

- U.S. National Register of Historic Places
- U.S. Historic district
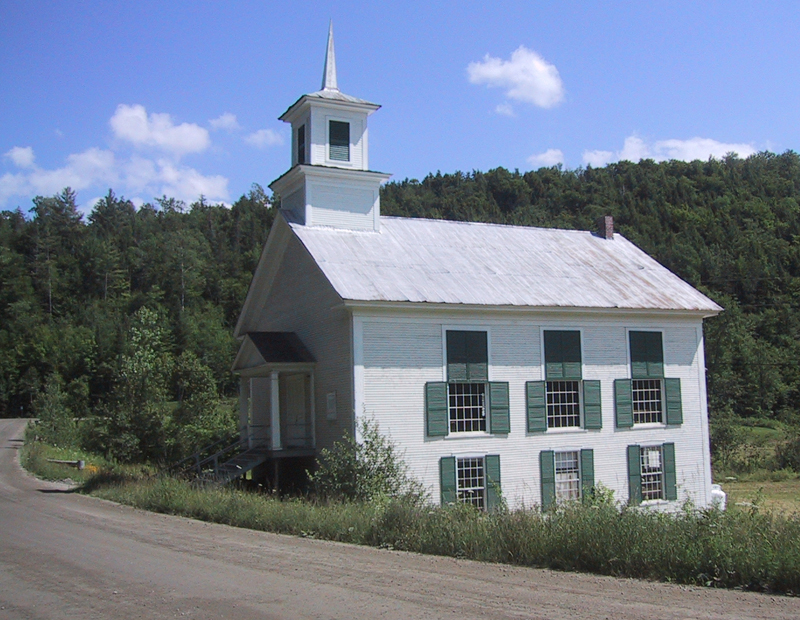
- Calais Town Hall, the former Christian Church

- Location within Vermont Location within the United States
- Location: Kent's Corner, Calais, Vermont
- Coordinates: 44°21′54″N 72°29′18″W
- Area: 320 acres (130 ha) (original size); 1,100 acres (450 ha) (after 2006 increase)
- NRHP reference No.: 73000199 (original); 06000534 (increase)

Significant dates
- Added to NRHP: May 8, 1973
- Boundary increase: June 30, 2006

The Kents Corner Historic District encompasses a well-preserved 19th-century crossroads hamlet in Calais, Vermont. Centered on the junction of Kent Hill Road, Old West Church Road, and Robinson Cemetery Road, it developed as a stagecoach stop with a small industrial presence. It was listed on the National Register of Historic Places in 1973, and substantially enlarged in 2006.

== Description and history ==
The Kents Corner area of Calais was settled in the late 1780s by members of the Wheelock family, and the area that is now called Kents Corner was where Remember Kent built his first log cabin (now incorporated into a nearby house) in 1797. The main roads (Kent Hill Road running east–west and Old West Church Road/Robinson Cemetery Road running north–south) were laid out in the early 20th century, crossing on Kent's property. The north–south road became part of a stagecoach route between Montpelier and Montreal, and the Kents added a tavern and general store to their holdings, the former surviving as a fine Federal period brick house that has most recently seen use as a local history museum. The area has historically remained rural and agricultural, although there have been several small-scale industrial uses, including mills and a small brickyard.

When first listed on the National Register in 1973, the district consisted of the properties within 0.25 miles (0.40 km) of the road junction, extended southward on Old West Church Road to include the Old West Church. Its resources were also incompletely described. In 2006, following a resurvey of the area, the district was substantially enlarged, extending eastward to Pekins Brook Road, westward about halfway to Maple Corner, and southward beyond the Old West Church to Bliss and Fowler Roads. In addition to the predominantly Greek Revival architecture found in the area, the expanded district includes industrial archaeological resources, and landscape features such as the Bliss Town Forest. At the eastern end of the district is the former church building that now serves as Calais Town Hall. North of the junction on Robinson Cemetery Road stands a 19th-century sawmill.

== See also ==
- Old West Church (Calais, Vermont)
- National Register of Historic Places listings in Washington County, Vermont
