= 1858 Chicago mayoral election =

Chicago mayoral election, 1858
- March 2, 1858
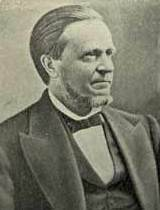

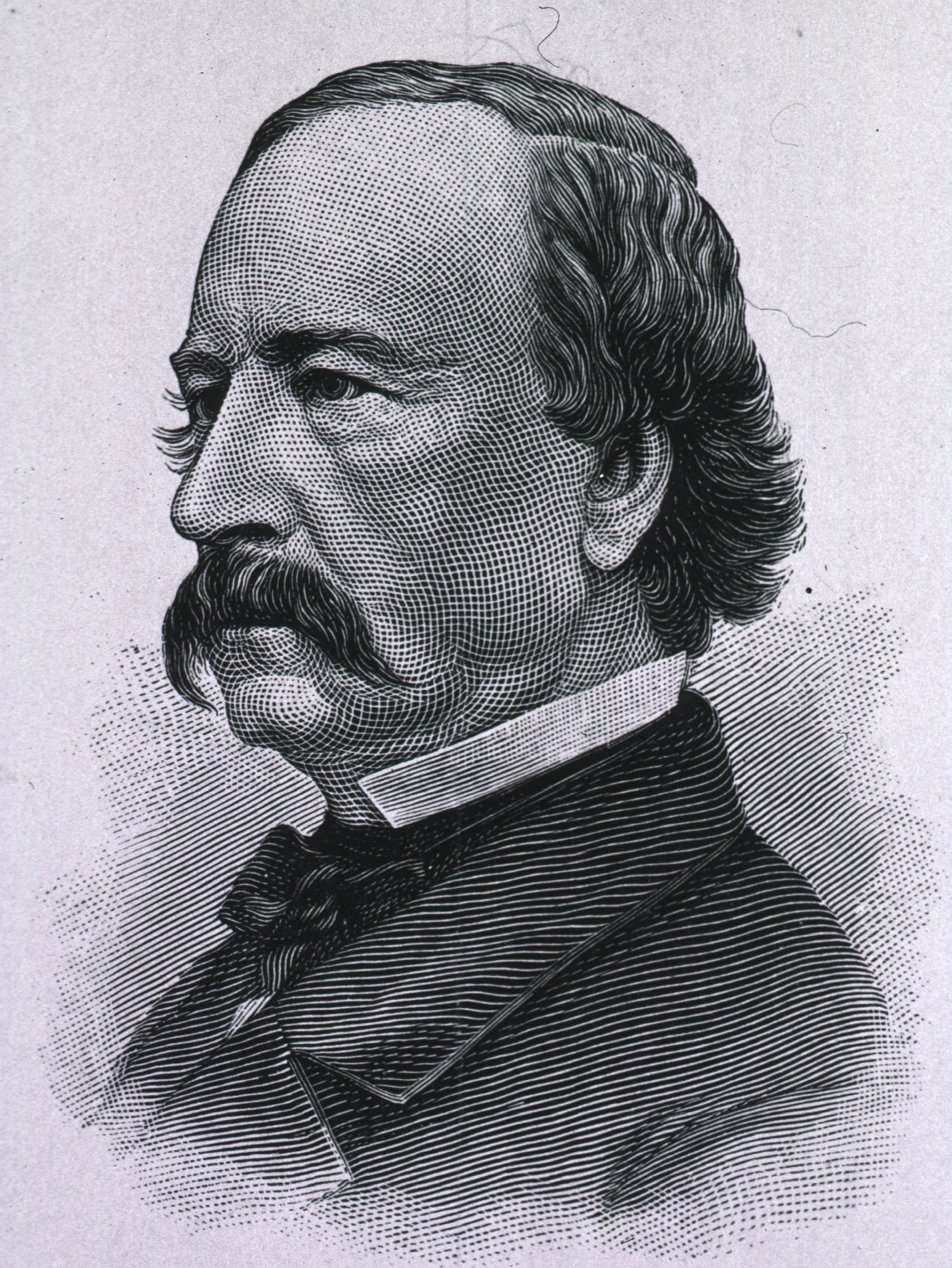
Candidate	John Charles Haines	Daniel Brainard
Party	Republican	Democratic
Popular vote	8,642	7,481
Percentage	53.60%	46.40%
Mayor before election
John Wentworth
Republican
Elected mayor
John Charles Haines
Republican

In the 1858 Chicago mayoral election, Republican John Charles Haines defeated Daniel Brainard.

The election was held on March 2.

== Results ==
1858 Chicago mayoral election
Party	Candidate	Votes	%
Republican	John Charles Haines	8,642	53.60
Democratic	Daniel Brainard	7,481	46.40
Turnout		16,123	
