= Calais, Vermont =

- Town
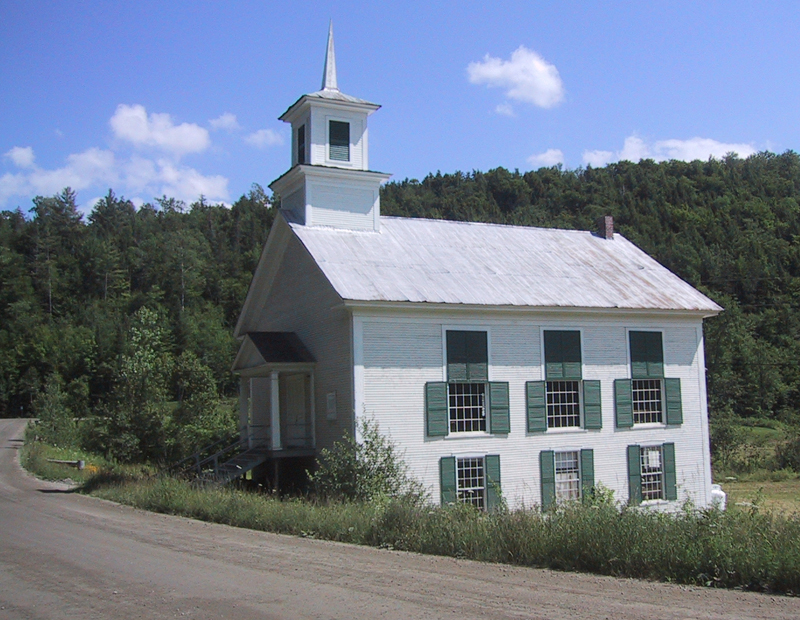
- Calais Town Hall

- Location in Washington County and the state of Vermont
- Coordinates: 44°22′15″N 72°29′35″W
- Country: United States
- State: Vermont
- County: Washington
- Communities: Adamant; East Calais; Kents Corner; Maple Corner (Calais P.O.); North Calais; Pekin

Area
  - Total: 38.6 sq mi (99.9 km^{2})
  - Land: 38.0 sq mi (98.5 km^{2})
  - Water: 0.58 sq mi (1.5 km^{2})
- Elevation: 1,158 ft (353 m)

Population (2020)
  - Total: 1,661
  - Density: 43.7/sq mi (16.9/km^{2})
- Time zone: UTC-5 (Eastern (EST))
  - Summer (DST): UTC-4 (EDT)
- ZIP Codes: 05648 (Calais); 05650 (East Calais); 05640 (Adamant); 05658 (Marshfield); 05666 (North Montpelier); 05667 (Plainfield); 05682 (Worcester)
- Area code: 802
- FIPS code: 50-11350
- GNIS feature ID: 1462062
- Website: www.calaisvermont.gov

Calais /ˈkælɪs/ is a town in Washington County, Vermont, United States. The population was 1,661 at the 2020 census. Calais contains the unincorporated communities of Adamant, East Calais, North Calais, Kents Corner, Maple Corner and Pekin.

== History ==
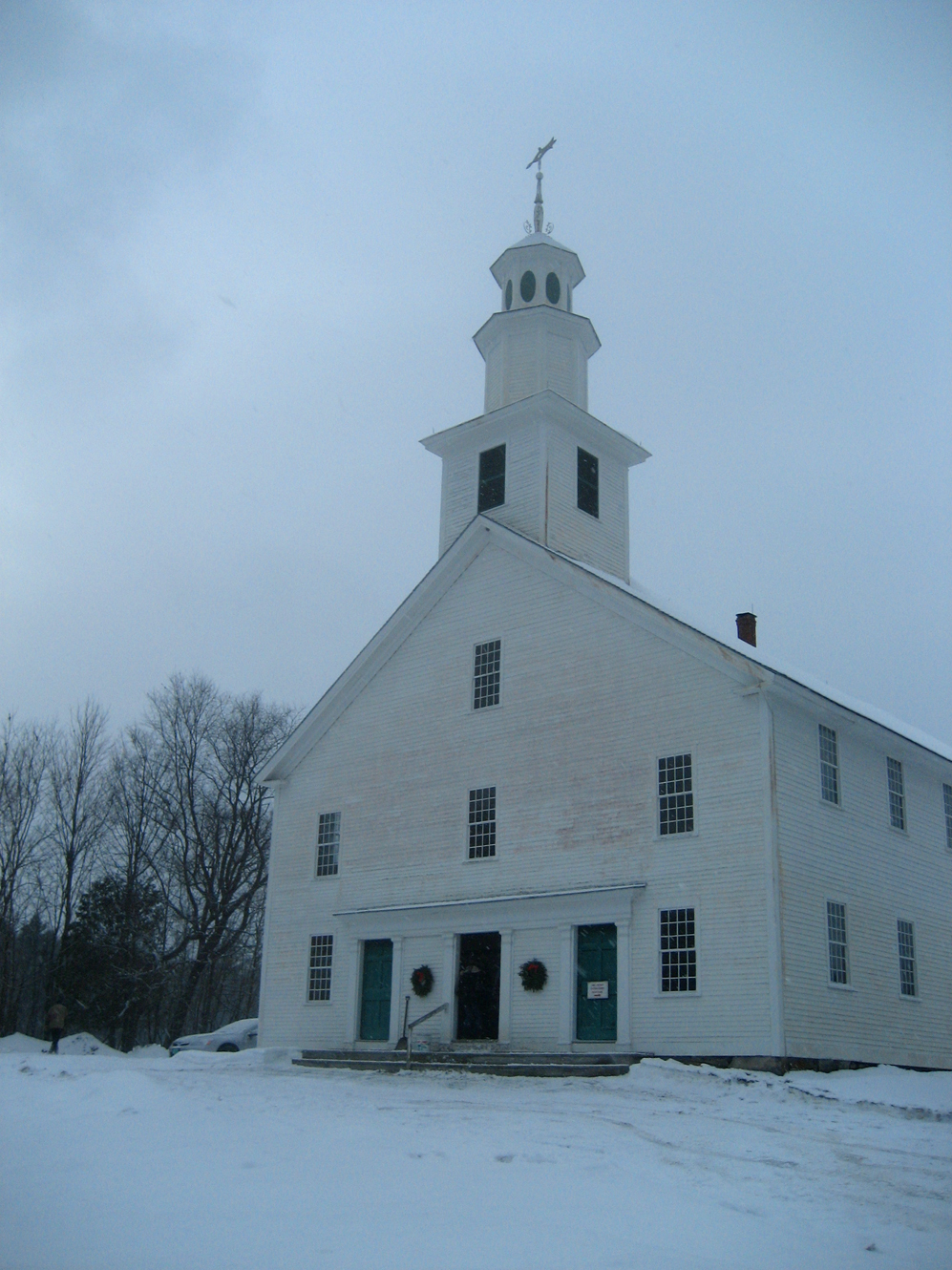
Old West Church on Christmas Eve

Colonel Jacob Davis named Calais after the French port city of the same name, during a time of general enthusiasm for things French as a result of France's aid during the American Revolution.

The Wheelocks and Parkers were the first families to settle the town, in the latter part of the 18th century. In the early and mid 19th century, the Vermont wool industry spawned sheep pastures in the town. Photographs of the time show a heavily de-forested Calais. Like many small Vermont towns, Calais was devastated by the Civil War. Volunteers from Calais flocked to the Union cause, most serving in the Army's volunteer regiments. In the post-Civil War era, agriculture turned from sheep to dairy, and new families came to fill farms that were sold by the families and widows of Civil War veterans.

=== Historical landmarks ===
- Kents Corner
- Old West Church
- Maple Corner
- Robinson Saw Mill
- Adamant Co-op

=== Village histories ===
Calais once had a village called Sodom. Some historians suggested that this name was given because the village had no church, though it did have a few active quarries. However, the name Sodom was in use well before the quarries opened. The reason for the name change from Sodom to Adamant is also a subject of modern conjecture, with some noting that the residents petitioned the state legislature to change the name to Adamant in 1905, chosen to suggest the hardness of granite. Another account says that the name was changed on the request of the postmaster general. This could be true since there is another locality in Vermont named Sodom in North Bennington, so the postmaster general may have wanted to eliminate the ambiguity in Vermont place names.

The name of the village of Pekin is also unclear in Calais history. Some accounts suggest that the village was named after Peking (now Beijing), China, the result of a local farmer who had a friend who was a missionary to China. According to this story, the missionary sent some Chinese wheat back to Vermont, the farmer planted it, and it flourished. It became the style to give directions using the wheat field as a landmark ("up by the Pekin wheat", or "just past the Pekin wheat"). Eventually, the location of the field came to be known simply as Pekin. Another version suggests that the missionary sent back rice, and that the farmer planted the rice in a low-lying plain, which flooded each spring. The river came to be known as Peking Brook, later and presently Pekin Brook. Although this story of a Chinese missionary connection is intriguing, no specific historical records exist to support it. An alternative source for the name could be from the Abenaki word pekan for fisher. This would give Pekin Brook, which runs through the village of Pekin, a similar name source as the Winooski River (winooski is Abenaki for onion), to which it joins.

== Geography ==
According to the United States Census Bureau, the town has a total area of 38.6 square miles (99.9 km^{2}), of which 38.0 square miles (98.5 km^{2}) is land and 0.6 square mile (1.5 km^{2}) (1.45%) is water.

The following bodies of water are within the town: Curtis Pond; Nelson Pond; Bliss Pond; Number 10 Pond, also known as Mirror Lake; and a portion of Woodbury Lake, also known as Sabin Pond.

== Demographics ==
Historical population
Census	Pop.	Note	%±
1790	45		—
1800	443		884.4%
1810	841		89.8%
1820	1,111		32.1%
1830	1,539		38.5%
1840	1,709		11.0%
1850	1,410		−17.5%
1860	1,409		−0.1%
1870	1,309		−7.1%
1880	1,253		−4.3%
1890	1,062		−15.2%
1900	1,101		3.7%
1910	1,042		−5.4%
1920	860		−17.5%
1930	812		−5.6%
1940	818		0.7%
1950	778		−4.9%
1960	684		−12.1%
1970	749		9.5%
1980	1,207		61.1%
1990	1,521		26.0%
2000	1,529		0.5%
2010	1,607		5.1%
2020	1,661		3.4%
U.S. Decennial Census

As of the census of 2000, there were 1,529 people, 616 households, and 418 families residing in the town. The population density was 40.2 people per square mile (15.5/km^{2}). There were 773 housing units at an average density of 20.3 per square mile (7.8/km^{2}). The racial makeup of the town was 96.08% White, 0.33% African American, 0.26% Native American, 0.20% Asian, 0.39% from other races, and 2.75% from two or more races. Hispanic or Latino of any race were 0.39% of the population.

There were 616 households, out of which 34.7% had children under the age of 18 living with them, 57.3% were married couples living together, 6.8% had a female householder with no husband present, and 32.0% were non-families. 24.0% of all households were made up of individuals, and 6.8% had someone living alone who was 65 years of age or older. The average household size was 2.48 and the average family size was 2.98.

In the town, the population was spread out, with 25.8% under the age of 18, 5.0% from 18 to 24, 26.3% from 25 to 44, 32.8% from 45 to 64, and 10.1% who were 65 years of age or older. The median age was 41 years. For every 100 females, there were 98.3 males. For every 100 females age 18 and over, there were 100.4 males.

The median income for a household in the town was $46,083, and the median income for a family was $49,107. Males had a median income of $33,000 versus $27,917 for females. The per capita income for the town was $20,722. About 4.9% of families and 6.5% of the population were below the poverty line, including 7.9% of those under age 18 and 5.4% of those age 65 or over.

== Notable people ==
- J. Ward Carver, Vermont Attorney General, 1925–1931
- Ela Chapin, state legislator
- Kenward Elmslie (1929–2022), poet, lyricist, publisher, performer
- John M. Gilman, Minnesota and Ohio state legislator, lawyer
- Marcus D. Gilman, Vermont legislator, businessman, and historian
- David Hinton, author and translator of Chinese poetry
- Louise Andrews Kent, author
- Asahel Pierce, merchant, pioneer and politician who was an early settler of Chicago
- John La Touche, musician and writer
- Dora V. Wheelock (1847–1923), temperance activist and writer

== External material ==
=== Further reading ===
- Cate, Weston. Forever Calais. Calais Historical Society: 1999.ISBN 0967666503.
- Miller, Peter. Vermont People. Vermont People Project: 1991. ISBN 0-9628064-0-4.
- Rodgers, Steve. Country Towns of Vermont. McGraw-Hill: 1998. ISBN 1-56626-195-3.
- Strickland, Ron. Vermonters: Oral Histories from Down Country to the Northeast Kingdom. University Press of New England: 1986. ISBN 0-87451-867-9.
- Swift, Esther Monroe. Vermont Place Names: Footprints of History. The Stephen Greene Press: 1996 ISBN 0-8289-0291-7.
- Van Susteren, Dirk, A Vermont Century: Photography and Essays from the Green Mountain State. Rutland Herald and Barre-Montpelier Times Argus: 1999. ISBN 0-932754-99-6.
