= Perley P. Pitkin =

US Civil War figure from Vermont (1826–1891)

- Born: March 9, 1826; Montpelier, Vermont
- Died: July 28, 1891 (aged 65); Montpelier, Vermont
- Military career
- Allegiance: United States of America; Union
- Branch: United States Army; Union Army
- Service years: 1861–1864
- Rank: Assistant Quartermaster of the Union Army
- Unit: 2nd Vermont Infantry Regiment
- Conflicts: American Civil War
- Other work: Quartermaster-General of the State of Vermont

Perley P. Pitkin (March 9, 1826 – July 28, 1891) was commissioned a 1st Lieutenant June 6, 1861, and served as Quarter Master for the 2nd Vermont Infantry Regiment. He was later promoted to Assistant Quartermaster of the Union Army by 1864. In 1864 the Vermont legislature elected him Quarter Master General for the state of Vermont with the rank of Brigadier General; a position he served in through 1869.

== Civil War ==
=== Early Service ===
Pitkin was a member of the Vermont state legislature when the American Civil War broke out, and after participating in the special war session of April, 1861, he offered himself as a volunteer, and was appointed Quartermaster of the 2nd Vermont Infantry Regiment. Perley P. Pitkin was then Commissioned 1st Lieutenant, and Regimental Quartermaster, of the 2nd VT, on June 6, 1861. Pitkin was promoted to the position of Captain and Assistant-Quartermaster, of U.S. Volunteers, and became one of the most trusted assistants of General Rufus Ingalls the Chief Quartermaster of the Army of the Potomac.

During the Antietam campaign, Captain Pitkin was Depot Quartermaster at Harper's Ferry, and later was Chief Depot Quartermaster of the Army of the Potomac, in charge of supplies at depots in Warrenton Junction, Falmouth, Belle Plain, and Aquia Creek. During the Gettysburg campaign, Captain Pitkin was Chief Depot Quartermaster for the army at Alexandria.

=== Later Service ===
In August 1864 Captain Pitkin was promoted to the rank of Colonel and Assistant Quartermaster of the United States Army. In November 1864, Colonel Pitkin resigned his position in the army to accept the office of Quartermaster-General of the State of Vermont, to which he had been elected by the Legislature, and which office he held for six years by successive elections.
