= Old West Church (Calais, Vermont) =

Historic church in Vermont, United States

- U.S. National Register of Historic Places
- U.S. Historic district – Contributing property
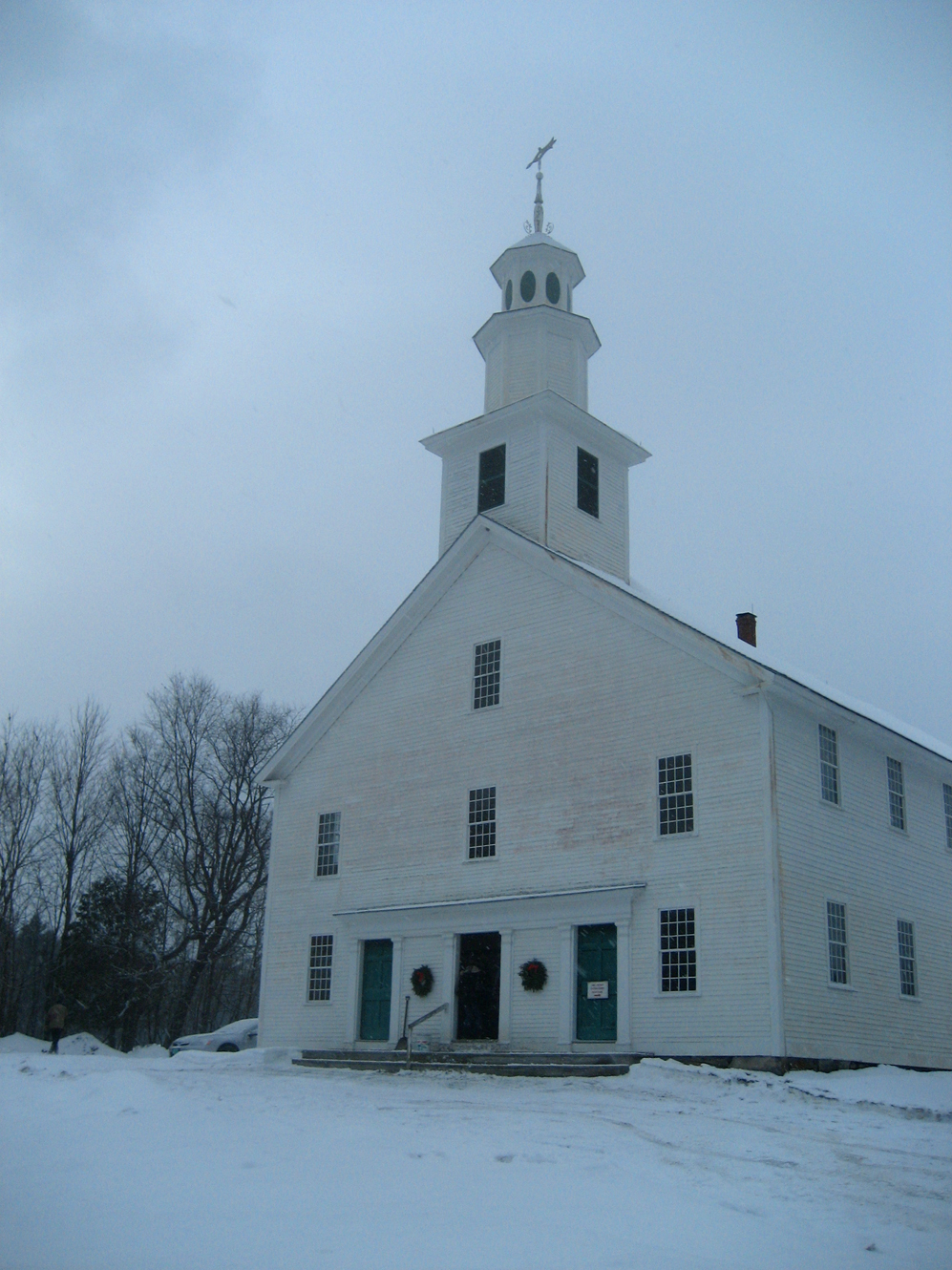

- Location within Vermont Location within the United States
- Location: 0.8 mi. S of Kent's Corner, Calais, Vermont
- Coordinates: 44°21′31″N 72°29′37″W
- Area: 9.9 acres (4.0 ha)
- Part of: Kents Corner Historic District (ID73000199)
- NRHP reference No.: 73000200

Significant dates
- Added to NRHP: May 8, 1973
- Designated CP: May 8, 1973

Old West Church is a historic church on Old West Church Road in the Kents Corner area of Calais, Vermont. Built 1823–25, it is a little-altered example of an early 19th-century rural Vermont church. It was added to the National Register of Historic Places in 1973.

== Description and history ==
The Old West Church stands in a rural area of Calais, 0.8 miles (1.3 km) south of the crossroads village of Kents Corner, on the west side of Old West Church Road. It is a tall single-story wood-frame structure, with a gabled roof, clapboarded exterior, and stone foundation. A three-stage tower rises above the front facade, with a square first stage housing the belfry, and two octagonal stages of decreasing size. The main facade has a bank of three similar entrances, each flanked by pilasters, and all set under a common entablature and cornice. Sash windows flank this assemblage, and a second level also has three sash windows. The interior has a vestibule with stairs leading to a gallery level on either side, and is otherwise a single large chamber. The gallery extends on three sides, supported by square posts. The pulpit is against the far wall, and the interior is filled with original plain pine box pews.

The church was built in the mid-1820s, in a style that was more common to the late 18th century. The pulpit, originally built at the height of the gallery, was lowered to its present height a few years later. The building has no modern amenities, and is heated by wood stoves installed at the rear in 1831. Its steeple was damaged by lightning in 1953, at which time the weathervane was replaced.

== See also ==
- National Register of Historic Places listings in Washington County, Vermont
