= Lyon's Turning Mill =

Historic Mill in Quincy, Massachusetts, US

- U.S. National Register of Historic Places
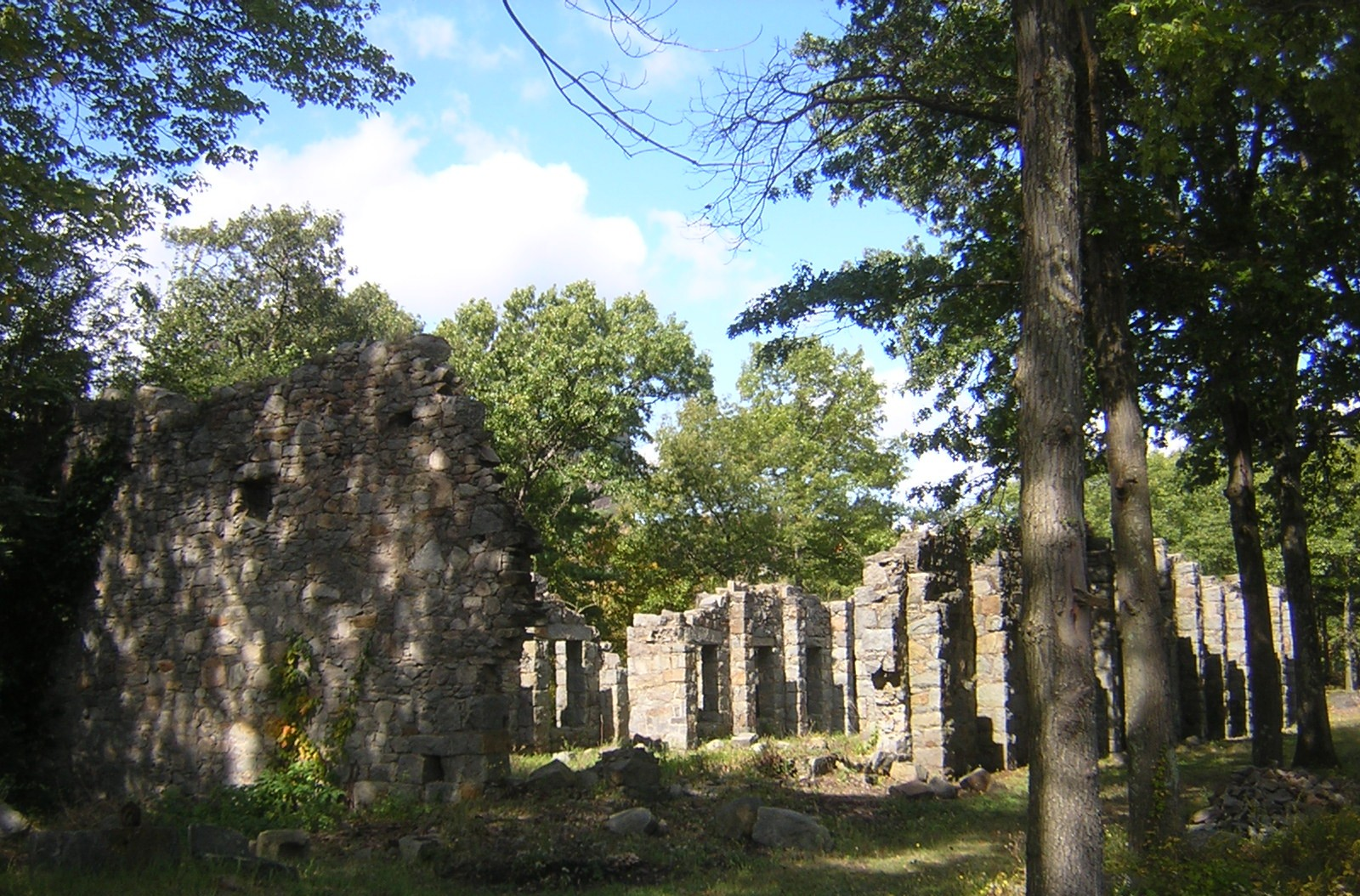

- Location within Massachusetts Location within the United States
- Nearest city: Quincy, Massachusetts
- Coordinates: 42°14′37.2″N 71°2′52″W
- Built: 1894
- MPS: Blue Hills and Neponset River Reservations MRA
- NRHP reference No.: 80000656
- Added to NRHP: September 25, 1980

Lyon's Turning Mill is a historic turning mill that created granite columns on Ricciuti Drive in Quincy, Massachusetts.

== History ==
The first quarry on the site, one of the earliest quarries in Quincy, was established on the site about 1825. In the late 1880s James Lyon bought the quarry and organized the Lyons Granite Company in 1893 with a paid in capital of $40,000. The mill, 200 ft by 90 ft (60m by 27m) was built in 1893-94 and equipped with lathes for turning large granite cylinders and jennies for polishing.

== Capacity ==
The mill's power plant had a 150 hp steam boiler and 100 hp steam engine which ran the shaft, belt and pulley system that drove the plant's machinery. It had a 20-ton traveling derrick and three other derricks with capacities ranging from 5 to 25 tons. It was capable of producing spheres up to 6 ft (1.8m) diameter and cylinders up to 3 ft (1.9m) diameter and 22 ft (7m) long. The mill employed about 80 workers in various trades until 1907, when it closed for unknown reasons.

It was added to the National Register of Historic Places on September 25, 1980. It is the proposed home of the recently formed Quincy Quarry & Granite Workers Museum.

== Gallery ==
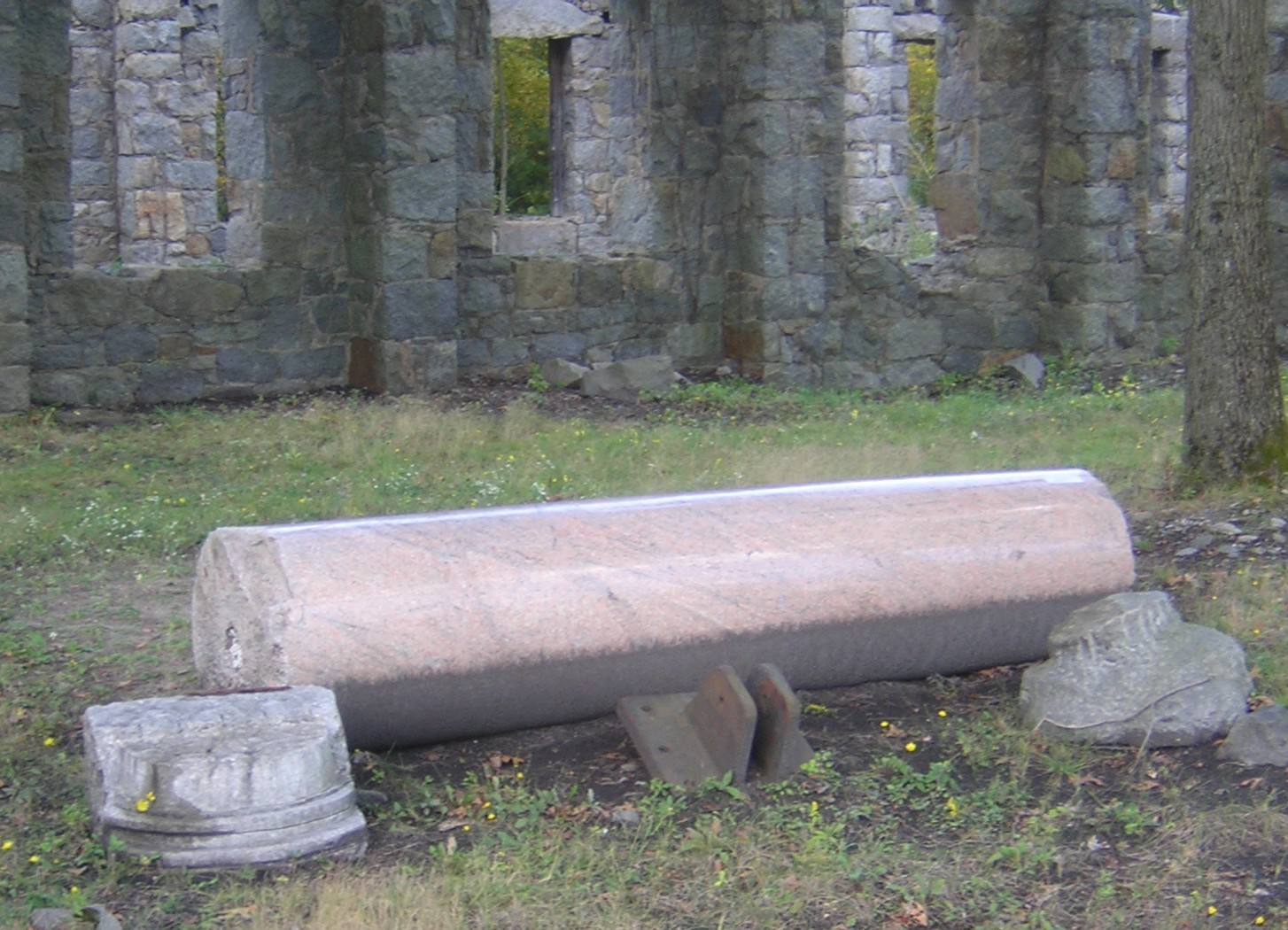
A granite column

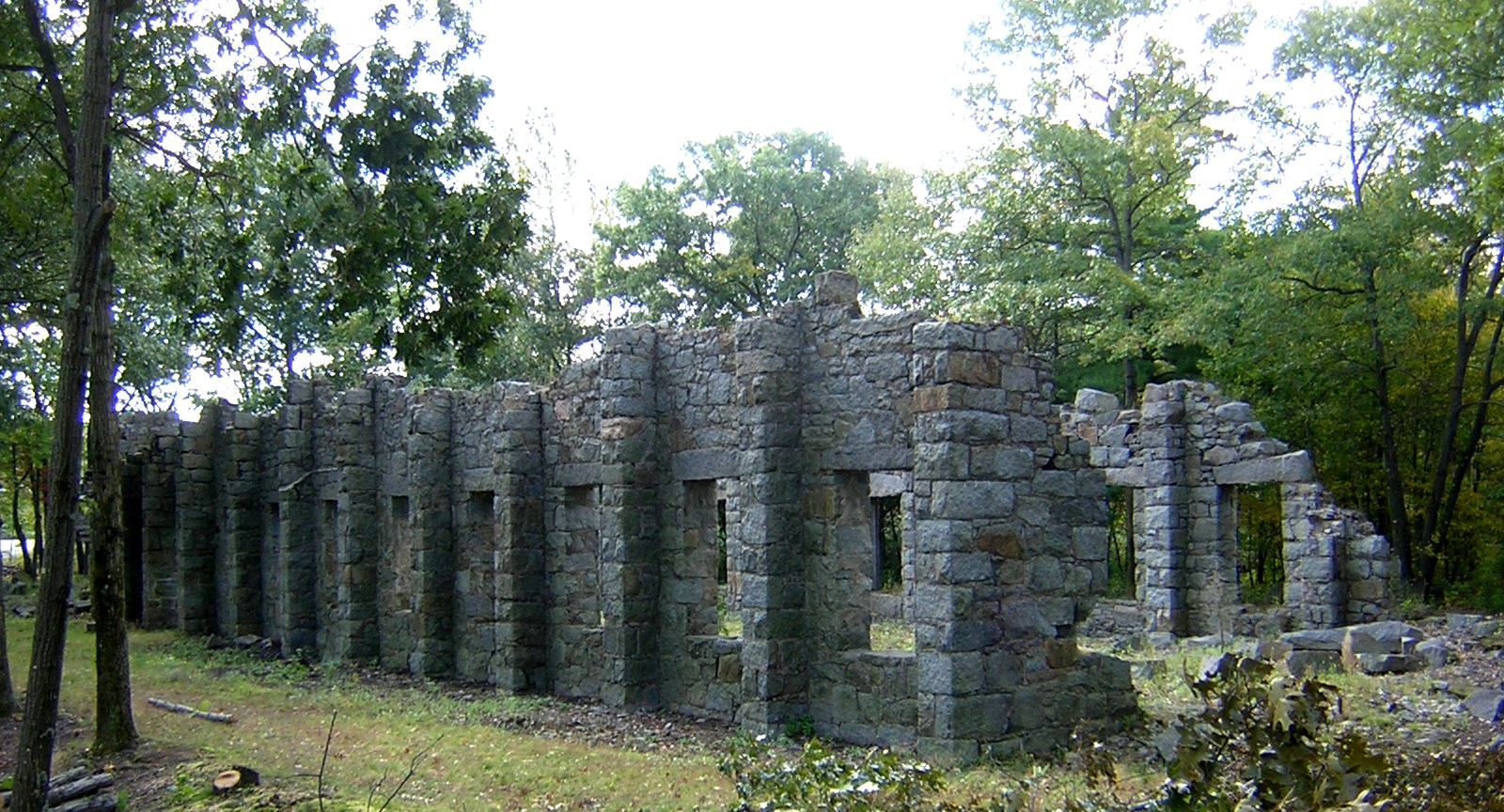
Walls of the mill

== See also ==
- National Register of Historic Places listings in Quincy, Massachusetts
- Beck and Beck Granite Shed: NRPH listed granite shed in Barre, Vermont
- E. L. Smith Roundhouse Granite Shed: NRHP listed granite shed in Barre, Vermont
