= E. L. Smith Roundhouse Granite Shed =

- E.L. Smith Roundhouse Granite Shed
- U.S. National Register of Historic Places
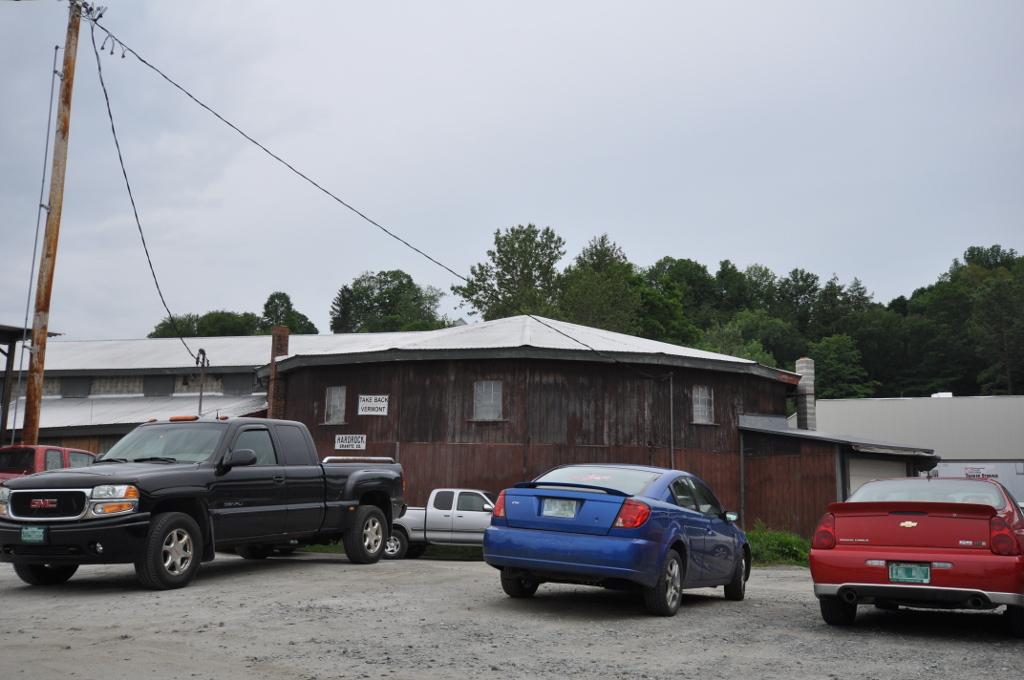

- Location within Vermont Location within the United States
- Location: Burnham St., Barre, Vermont
- Coordinates: 44°11′51″N 72°30′19″W
- Area: less than one acre
- Built: 1933
- Architectural style: Horseshoe Granite Shed
- NRHP reference No.: 11000704
- Added to NRHP: September 26, 2011

The E.L. Smith Roundhouse Granite Shed is a historic granite shed at 23 Burnham Street in the city of Barre, Vermont. Built in 1889, it is the only known surviving example of a circular granite cutting shed in the United States. It was listed on the National Register of Historic Places in 2011.

== Description and history ==
The E.L. Smith Roundhouse Granite Shed stands on the south side of Burnham Street, across from the Stevens Branch of the Winooski River from downtown Barre. The shed is part of a larger industrial site, most of which is still taken up by granite-related businesses. It is a sixteen-sided building, two stories in height, with a low-pitch conical roof and its walls finished in wooden clapboards. The roof originally had a cupola at the center; this was lost to a fire in 1968 which also destroyed a number of other original features. The interior timber framing of the building is largely still in place, although some elements have been replaced by steel framing. An original crane is mounted on a central rotating jib, allowing it to service all parts of the building. A two-story ell extends east from the main shed, with a shed-roof office attached to its eastern end.

The main shed was built in 1889 by Emery L. Smith, owner of a local granite quarry. Smith was influential in the growth of Barre's granite industry, promoting the development of the railroad connecting the quarries to the cutting sheds in the downtown area. He was also innovative in the extraction and processing of the stone, with the circular design of this building among those innovations, as it permitted the central crane to move heavy stone slabs anywhere within the building. The crane still has many of its original parts, although it is now powered electrically rather than by hand. The building continues to be used for granite processing, having gone through a succession of industrial owners.

== See also ==
- National Register of Historic Places listings in Washington County, Vermont
- Beck and Beck Granite Shed: NRPH listed granite shed also in Barre, Vermont
- Lyon's Turning Mill: NRHP listed granite mill in Quincy, Massachusetts
