= Beck and Beck Granite Shed =

- U.S. National Register of Historic Places
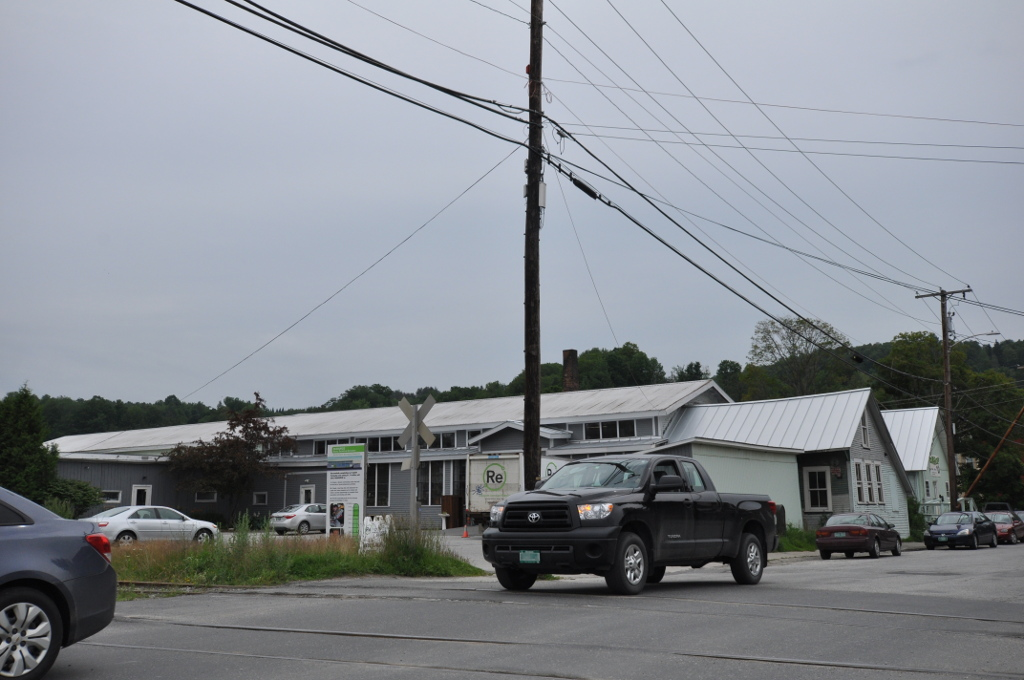

- Location within Vermont Location within the United States
- Location: 34 Granite St., Barre, Vermont
- Coordinates: 44°11′58″N 72°30′23″W
- Area: 0.6 acres (0.24 ha)
- Built: 1933
- Architectural style: Straight Granite Shed
- NRHP reference No.: 11000714
- Added to NRHP: September 29, 2011

The Beck and Beck Granite Shed is a historic granite shed at 34 Granite Street in the city of Barre, Vermont. Built in 1933, it is a rare surviving example of a rectangular granite shed, a late style of granite processing facility. The Beck and Beck Company was started by the area's first German immigrants, and operated until 1960. The building now houses a non-profit and store that repurposes and recycles building materials. It was listed on the National Register of Historic Places in 2011.

== Description and history ==
The Beck and Beck Granite Shed stands on the southeast side of Granite Street, across the railroad tracks from downtown Barre. The shed consists of a long rectangular single-story wood-frame structure, oriented perpendicular to the street, to which a number of additions and connected structures have been added. The main structure is 130 feet (40 m) long and 75 feet (23 m) wide, and is covered by a gabled roof with a band of clerestory windows. Between this structure and the street is an attached office building presenting a saltbox profile to the street, and to its left is a vernacular shed-roof building. Roughly midway down the length of the main structure is a projecting section to the right. In the crook created by this projection is a long gabled building, which is connected to the main shed by a hyphen.

The main shed was built in 1933, replacing an older horseshoe-shaped granite shed. The Beck and Beck Company, its builder, was established in 1898 by members of the Beck family, German immigrants who had primarily been ironworkers prior to coming to Vermont. This build was designed to facilitate the movement of granite during its transformation from raw material to finished object, typically cemetery markers. Its design took advantage of the development of the overhead traveling bridge crane, which could be used to move heavy granite blocks within a rectangular facility. (The previous horseshoe-shaped facility was serviced by a centrally-placed derrick crane with a boom, which moved the blocks from arriving railroad cars to areas of the building within range of the boom.) The building continued to be used for granite processing (after 1976 by a succession of different owners) until 2009. It now houses ReSOURCE, a local non-profit that repurposes donated building materials and provides job training and other programs.

== See also ==
- National Register of Historic Places listings in Washington County, Vermont
- E. L. Smith Roundhouse Granite Shed: NRHP listed granite shed also in Barre, Vermont
- Lyon's Turning Mill: NRHP listed granite mill in Quincy, Massachusetts
