= Taiwo =

Taiwo Oduala
- Language: Yoruba

Origin
- Meaning: First twin to taste the world.

Other names
- Variant forms: Taiye, Taye, Taiyewo
- Related names: Kehinde
- See also: Kehinde

listen

Taiwo (variant forms: Taiye, Taye, Taiyewo) is a name of Yoruba origin meaning "the first twin to taste the world" or the one who comes before Kehinde. Although Taiwo is the firstborn twin, in Yoruba belief Taiwo is considered the younger twin, having been sent into the world by Kehinde to determine if it is the right time to be born. The names are associated with the Yoruba belief in Ibeji, sacred twins.

== Given name ==
- Augustus Taiwo Solarin, (1922–1994) Nigerian educator and activist
- Taiwo Ajai Lycett (born 1941), Nigerian actress
- Hassanat Taiwo Akinwande, stage name Wunmi, Nigerian film and television actress
- Taiwo Aladefa (born 1974), retired Nigerian 100 m hurdler
- Taiwo Allimi (born 1944), Nigerian journalist and media executive
- Taiwo Atieno (born 1985), English-born Kenyan international footballer
- Taiwo Awoniyi (born 1997), Nigerian footballer
- Pastor Taiwo Odubiyi (born 1965), Senior Associate Pastor, Still Waters Church International, Ikorodu, Nigeria
- Taiwo Owatemi, British Labour MP
- Taiwo Rafiu (born 1972), Nigerian women's basketball player
- Taiye Selasi (born 1979), British writer
- Taye Babalola (born, 1991), Nigerian footballer

== Last/family name ==
- Cornelius Olaleye Taiwo (1910–2014), Nigerian educator and lawyer
- Ibrahim Taiwo, Military Governor of Kwara State from July 1975 to February 1976
- Jeremy Taiwo (born 1990), American decathlete
- Joseph Taiwo (born 1959), retired Nigerian athlete who competed in the triple jump
- Olúfẹ́mi O. Táíwò, Nigerian-American philosopher
- Solomon Taiwo (born 1985), footballer
- Taye Taiwo (born 1985), Nigerian professional footballer
- Tom Taiwo "Tom" Taiwo (born 1990), English football midfielder
- Wasiu Taiwo (born 1976), Nigerian football player
- Abdulrahman Taiwo (born 1998), Nigerian football player

== See also ==
- Kehinde
- Ibeji
- Tai Wo
- Taiho (disambiguation)
- Tawo
- Tayo (disambiguation)
- Tiyo
