= Akinwande =

- Gender: Male
- Language: Yoruba

Origin
- Origin: Nigerian
- Region of origin: South -West Nigeria

Akinwande is a surname of Yoruba origin. Notable people with the surname include:

- Akintunde Akinwande, Nigerian-American scientist and engineer
- Deji Akinwande, Nigerian-American scientist and engineer
- Hassanat Akinwande, Nigerian actress
- Henry Akinwande (born 1965), English boxer
