= Fleming Museum =

Fleming Museum may refer to:

- Fleming Museum of Art at the University of Vermont, United States
- Alexander Fleming Museum at St Mary's Hospital in London, England
