= Fleming Museum of Art =

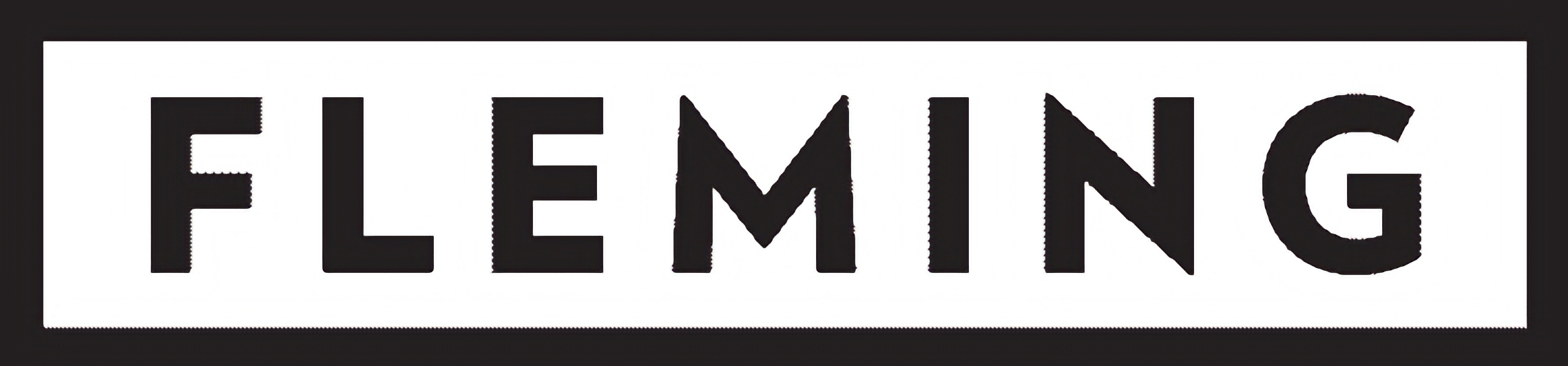
- Former name: Robert Hull Fleming Museum
- Established: 1931
- Location: 61 Colchester Avenue; Burlington, Vermont
- Coordinates: 44.480028°N 73.197139°W
- Type: Art museum
- Director: Sonja Lunde
- Curator: Heather Ferrell
- Owner: University of Vermont
- Website: www.uvm.edu/fleming

The Fleming Museum of Art is a museum of art and anthropology at the University of Vermont in Burlington, Vermont. The museum's collection includes around 24,000 objects from a wide variety of eras and places.

According to the Vermont Encyclopedia, the museum is a cultural center for the community and "attracts a diverse audience from UVM, area colleges, and the general public."

== History ==
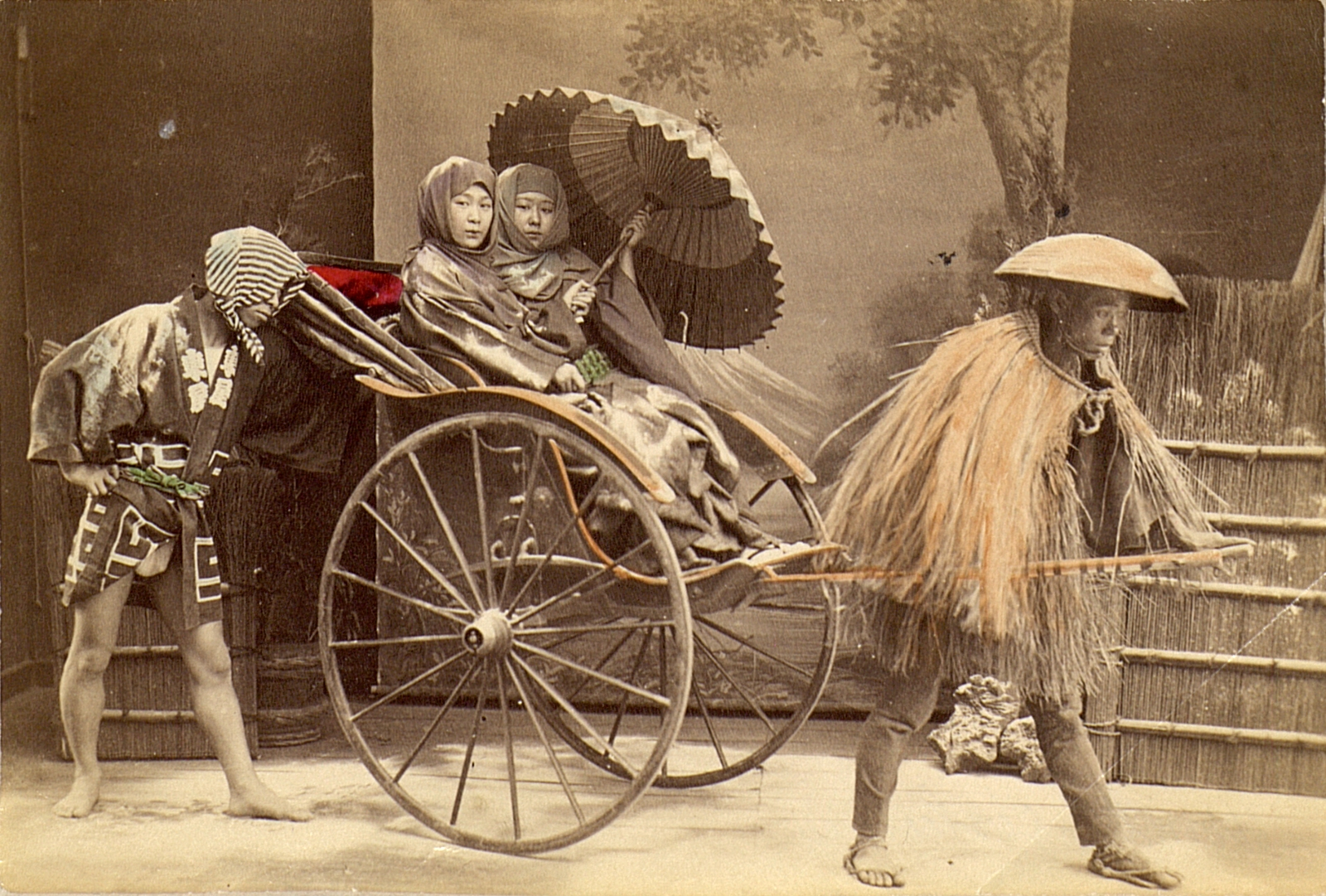
Rickshaw driver picking up two clients, circa 1909. This is a photo-postcard from a trip to Japan that Katherine Wolcott and her uncle, Robert Hull Fleming, made in 1909.

The University of Vermont began to acquire a collection of art, artifacts, and other objects in 1826, when a society of faculty and others formed the College of Natural History, a society separate from the university but housing its collections in the Old Mill on the University Green, in order to begin "the acquisition and diffusion of knowledge in every department of natural history, and the accumulation of books, instruments and all materials which can advance these ends." Among the museum's initial collections were "fossils, stuffed birds, a sperm whale tooth, and a cannon ball that a local resident found while gardening."

When the collection outgrew its Old Mill space, it was relocated to Torrey Hall in 1862. Less than ten years later, a third story was built at Torrey Hall for the university's fine art collection, and the space became known as the Park Gallery of Fine Arts. The collection remained at Torrey Hall in the late 1920s, although it was outgrowing its space.

The formation of the modern Fleming Museum of Art came in 1929, when Katherine Wolcott, the niece and only heir of Robert Hull Fleming and an artist herself, traveled from Chicago to Burlington, intending to establish a scholarship in honor of her late uncle, who had graduated from the University of Vermont in 1862 before becoming a wealthy Chicago grain merchant. Wolcott met with university president Guy Bailey, who proposed a new museum building in memory of Fleming. Wolcott accepted Bailey's proposal and donated $150,000 for the construction of the Fleming Museum. Soon afterward, the museum received another large contribution from James B. Wilbur of Manchester, Vermont, who donated $100,000 and his large collection of books and papers - including the papers of Ethan Allen - related to the history of Vermont to the museum. These two gifts funded the $300,000 cost of construction the museum, and Wolcott donated an additional $150,000 for an endowment soon after. The museum opened in 1931.

The university was one of the first to include a room specifically for children, and placed an emphasis on community service and education, including free movies, lectures, and workshops every Saturday, a traveling exhibit program for schools, and an adult education program with evening lectures and classes. In the mid-1930s, between 25,000 and 30,000 people visited the Fleming Museum annually, at a time when the population of Burlington was estimated at 27,000.

The museum impacted the development of the University of Vermont. The university's studio art and art history departments began at the Fleming Museum of Art, and in the 1950s, the museum director was the chair of the university's art department. In the 1950s, the university shifted the museum's focus to make it an art museum, and many original artifacts from the "cabinet of curiosities" were moved to a number of university departments to free up space for newly acquired objects.

A $1.4 million renovation to the museum was completed in 1984. Until 2014, the museum was known as the Robert Hull Fleming Museum.

The previous director of the museum was Janie Cohen, who led it for 20 years.

== Collections ==
The Fleming Museum includes several collections:

- African. The museum's African collection consists mainly of West and Central African sculpture. Among the museum's important Africa pieces are premodern pieces such as a Queen Mother sculpture head from Benin (18th century), Ashanti gold weights, a Mende sowo mask, and southeast African beadwork and carved wooden pieces (19th-century) as well as more recent works, including "a telephone-wire basket from South Africa and plastic Ibeji figures from Nigeria."
- American. The museum's American art collection emphasizes "19th-and 20th-century landscapes; early 20th-century prints, drawings, and photographs; early Rookwood pottery; Vermont wedding gowns; and works in a variety of media by Vermont artists active from the mid-19th century through the present." The museum lists John James Audubon, Albert Bierstadt, Ilya Bolotowsky, Margaret Bourke-White, Charles Demuth, Charles Louis Heyde, Lewis Hine, Winslow Homer, Yasuo Kuniyoshi, Sol LeWitt, Glenn Ligon, Florine Stettheimer, Alfred Stieglitz, Claire Van Vliet, Andy Warhol, and Kara Walker as some of the artists represented.
- Ancient Art and Archaeology. The museum's collection includes a number of objects dating from antiquity, with artifacts in the collection coming from Ancient Egypt, the Near East, the Mediterranean, and prehistoric Vermont. Notable pieces include an Assyrian bas-relief from the palace of Ashurnasirpal II, dated as 3,000 years old. Other objects in the collection include "Sumerian cuneiform tablets, Greek pottery, Coptic textiles, and more than 400 Egyptian objects, including a late Dynastic mummy and coffin."
- Asian. The museum's Asian collection includes a number of objects, including "Shang dynasty bronze vessels, Tang dynasty Tomb figures, and Qing dynasty textiles from China; East Asian bronzes; and Korean ceramics, as well as Japanese lacquerware, calligraphy, and prints." The highlight of the museum's Japanese print collection is a complete set of Hiroshige's Fifty-three Stations of the Tōkaidō. Sculpture and decorative art pieces from Thailand, Cambodia, and Burma, acquired from the Doris Duke Collection, are also represented in the collection, along with a number of works of Indian art.
- Europe. The museum's European collection includes a variety of works, with an emphasis on Northern European paintings and prints of the 16th and 17th centuries and British portraits of the 18th century. The museum also hold a complete edition of the Description de l'Égypte, the result of Napoleon's campaign in Egypt. Among the oldest items in the collection are 13th-century illuminated manuscripts. According to the museum, European artists represented in the collection include Max Beckmann, Jean-Baptiste-Camille Corot, Honoré Daumier, Albrecht Dürer, Hendrik Goltzius, Francisco Goya, William Hogarth, Giovanni Battista Piranesi, and Auguste Rodin.
- Native American. The museum's indigenous peoples of the Americas collection is housed in the James B. Petersen Gallery of Native American Cultures, which reopened in 2006 following renovation. The collection includes some 2,000 objects dating from c. 800 CE and originating in a variety of places in North and South America. Notable items include the Ogden B. Read Northern Plains Collection, which includes beadwork and quillwork; Southwestern objects, including ceramics, baskets, and textiles; and Pacific Northwest Coast objects, including masks, carvings, and a Chilkat blanket. The museum also holds the "Colchester Jar," a ceramic vessel dated to around the year 1500 and representative of the St. Lawrence Iroquoian style, which was found in Vermont in the early 19th century.
- Oceanic. The museum's collection of artifacts from Oceania includes objects from New Guinea, Easter Island, Samoa, the Solomon Islands, the Trobriand Islands, aboriginal Australia, and the Marquesas Islands. Significant objects include "Tatanua ceremonial masks from New Ireland, a Trobriand shield, and contemporary Aboriginal paintings from Australia."
- Pre-Columbian. The museum holds a number of artifacts from the pre-Columbian era, including textiles, ceremonial stone carvings, and ceramics, including jars, bowls, and effigies of humans and animals.

== Museum architecture ==
The Fleming Museum building was designed by William Mitchell Kendall of McKim, Mead & White, a prominent New York City architectural firm in the early 20th century. Several other University of Vermont campus buildings were designed by McKim, Mead & White, the earliest being the Ira Allen Chapel (1926) with the last being the Waterman Building (1940–41). The Fleming Museum building is an example of Colonial Revival architecture, with red bricks and boarding wood trim bordered white. Architectural elements in the museum building include pediments, pilasters, entablatures, and balustrades.

The Marble Court was the museum's original entrance, and includes a two-story central courtyard with columns supporting a balcony on the second floor. The concept was the idea of the museum's first benefactor Katherine Wolcott, who drew a sketch of the design based on the Isaac Delgado Art Museum, which is now the New Orleans Museum of Art. William Mitchell Kendall had built a similar space for the Cohen Memorial Fine Arts Building at George Peabody College for Teachers in Nashville, Tennessee. The Marble Court uses marble from Italy, France, and Vermont for the grand staircase, columns, and floors of the space.

A second important space in the museum is the Wilbur Room, which includes walnut wall paneling, a groin-vaulted white plaster ceiling with decorative scrolls with the names Ira Allen, Thomas Chittenden, Ethan Allen, and Stephen R. Bradley, four people who influenced Vermont's early history. The room also has an enormous brass chandelier. The Wilbur Room is named after Museum benefactor James B. Wilbur of Manchester, Vermont, and the room originally housed Wilbur's collection of historical manuscripts, whilewere later moved to the university's Bailey/Howe Library and today are the foundation of the library's Special Collections.

Renovations to the museum in 1984 reoriented the building's entrance, moving it from the front to the rear of the building and increasing accessibility, and included building additions designed by the Watertown, Massachusetts-based Crissman and Solomon Associates. New additions included a climate control system, corridor display cases, a new reception area, a museum store, and an altered gallery floor plan that allowed for exhibition space to be more flexible. The renovations preserved the original building's brick rear wall as an interior wall of this addition.
