= Kehinde =

- Language: Yoruba

Origin
- Meaning: Second-born twin

Other names
- Variant forms: Kehindegbegbon, Kaindé, Kenny
- Related names: Taiwo, Taiye
- See also: Taiwo

Kehinde (short for Omokehinde) is a given name of Yoruba origin meaning "the second-born of the twins" or the one who comes after Taiwo. Though Taiwo is the firstborn, it is believed that Kehinde is the elder twin, sending Taiwo into the world first to determine if it is time to be born.

== Notable people ==
- Kehinde Andrews, British academic
- Kehinde Sofola (1924–2007), Nigerian jurist
- Kehinde Kamson (born 1961), Nigerian businesswoman
- Stephen K. Amos (born 1967), British comedian
- Kehinde Aladefa (born 1974), Nigerian hurdler
- Kehinde Fadipe (born 1983), British actress
- Kehinde Wiley (born 1977), American artist
- Kehinde Fatai (born 1990), Nigerian-Romanian footballer
- Kehinde Babatunde Victor Oladipo (born 1992), better known as Victor Oladipo, American basketball player
- Lisa-Kaindé Díaz (born 1994), French-Cuban musician
- Kehinde Bankole, Nigerian actress
- Kehinde Lijadu (born 1948), of Nigerian singing duo the Lijadu Sisters

Sometimes the name is also used in an Anglicised form as Kenny. Notable people known with this name include:

- Kenny Adeleke (born, 1983), Nigerian-American basketball player
- Kenny Onatolu (born 1982), American football player
- Kenny Ogungbe, Nigerian musician
- Kenny Blaq, Nigerian comedian

== See also ==
- Taiwo
- Ibeji
