= Lugbe =

Town in Abuja, Nigeria

Lugbe, Abuja is a residential district and town in Abuja. The town covers approximately 50 km^{2}. The community is a countryside settlement expanding on the urban fringe of Abuja. The area is site to a Voice of Nigeria Transmission Station (VNT), FHA Estate and the National Space Development and Research Agency.

A major flood on the Trademoore Estates in Lugbe, solicited national attention because it killed the residents and destroyed the newly built community. The National Emergency Management Agency described the destruction as due to violation of building codes for floodplains. The district had previously seen illegal buildings torn down by the regional government. More generally, a study using sampling from 2015 found that Unplanned land use has also led to waste water and other contamination runoff into water bodies, creating potential public health risks.

A 2019 study found that household waste burning in the district was found to have respiratory effects on local residents.

== Geography ==
The area primarily has granite and the Migmatite-gneiss in the soil.
