= Ira Allen Chapel =

Campus building in Burlington, Vermont, US

- U.S. Historic district – Contributing property
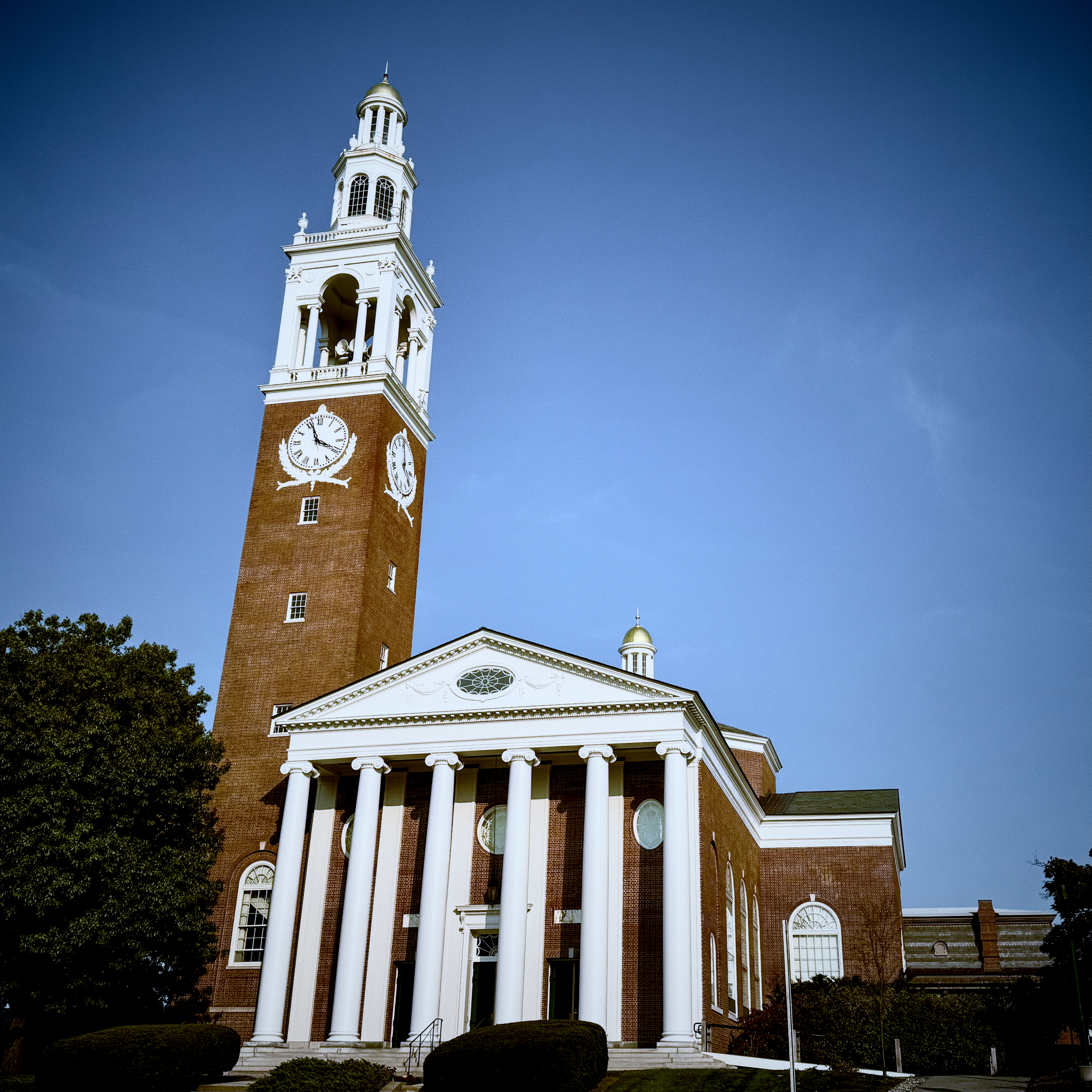

- Location within Vermont Location within the United States
- Location: Burlington, Vermont
- Coordinates: 44°28′47″N 73°11′57″W
- Built: 1925–26
- Architect: McKim, Mead & White (William Mitchell Kendall, Supervising Architect)
- Architectural style: Colonial Revival
- Part of: University Green Historic District (ID75000139)
- Added to NRHP: April 14, 1975

Ira Allen Chapel is a secular chapel on the campus of the University of Vermont (UVM), which is located on the northeast corner of the "University Green" in Burlington, Vermont.

The building was constructed during 1925–26, and dedicated on January 14, 1927. It was added to National Register of Historic Places as part of University Green Historic District on April 14, 1975.

== History ==
Named after the University's founder, Ira Allen, construction was made possible by a $200,000 endowment from James Benjamin Wilbur, LL. D (1856–1929) of Manchester, Vermont in 1924.

=== Construction ===
The cornerstone of the Ira Allen Chapel was installed on June 22, 1925 as part of the commencement activities that year, coincidentally occurring exactly one-hundred years after the cornerstone was laid for Old Mill by General Lafayette. The ceremony was officiated with an opening prayer by the Reverend John Lowe Fort, followed by the hymn “Glorious Things of Thee Are Spoken". An inscription which was carved into the granite reads; "Dedicated to the service of God erected in memory of the founder of this university Ira Allen - 1925".

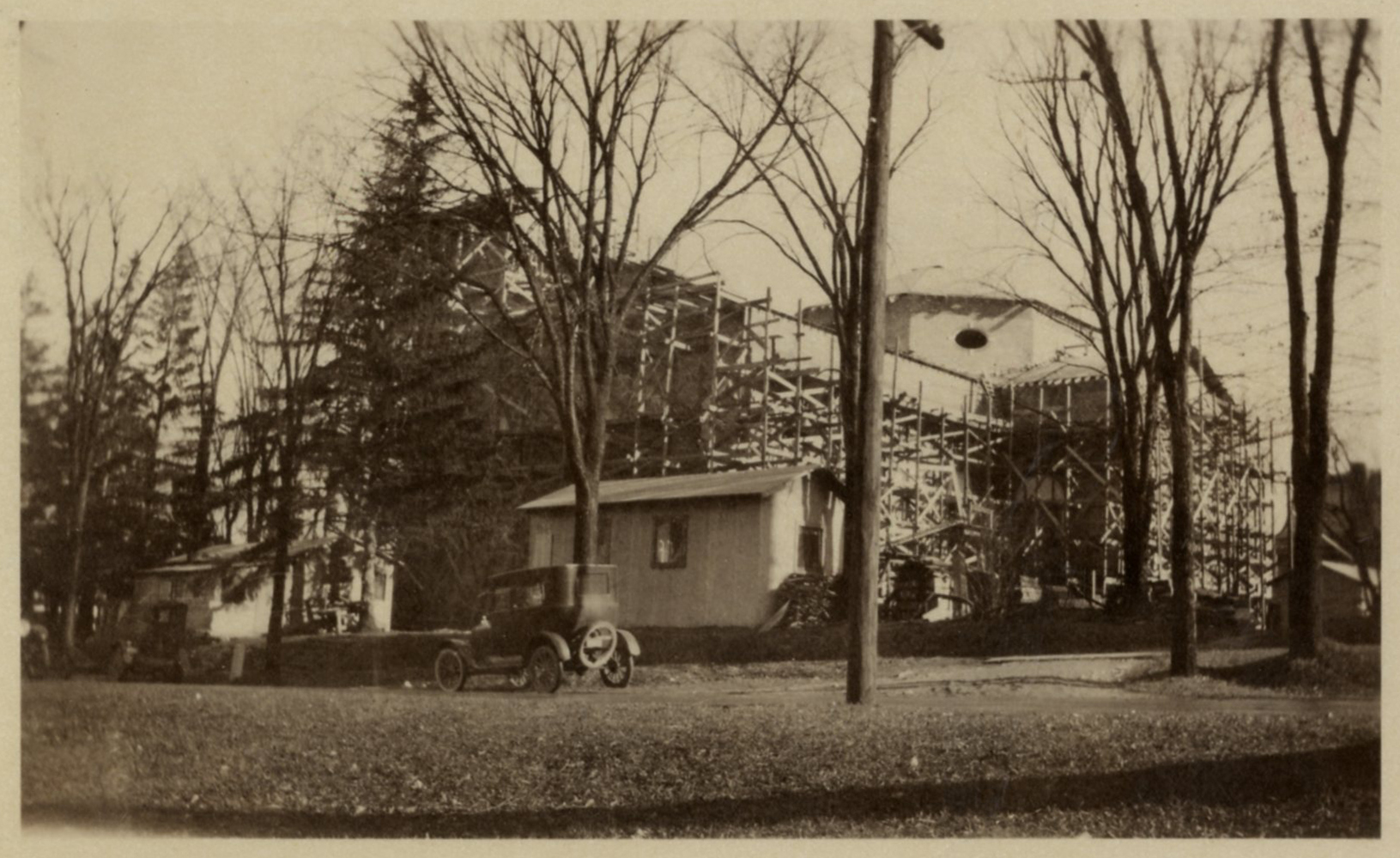
Construction of the Ira Allen Chapel in 1925

The building was designed by the architect William Mitchell Kendall of McKim, Mead, and White of New York; the same architectural firm which designed the university's Waterman Building (built in 1941), Fleming Museum (1931), Southwick Building (1934), Slade Hall (1928), as well as Burlington City Hall (1928). The building was erected under the supervision of builder, O.S. Nichols (of Essex Junction, Vermont).

Angell Hall (or the Angell House), originally built in 1869 to serve as the President's house (and later converted into a Women's dormitory in 1917) was demolished to make way for construction of the chapel.

In May 1926, the chapel's 2,063 lb (936 kg) bell, manufactured by the McShane Bell Foundry Company, Inc. of Baltimore, Maryland was installed in the belfry (for the total cost of $1,685).

During the construction of the chapel's tower, rumors had been circulated that it was unstable. After some investigation engineers reported that the tower's structure was more than sufficient, explaining that the tower's interior corner wooden columns and their connecting castings over the top of the open arches were filled with reinforced concrete.

=== James B. Wilbur: Benefactor ===
James Benjamin Wilbur was a wealthy businessman and American history enthusiast who had made his fortune in ranching and banking in Colorado, and serving as president of the Royal Trust Company of Chicago until his retirement and move to Vermont in 1909. During his retirement years he had amassed a substantial collection of documents pertaining to Vermont history. In this time Wilbur discovered and developed keen intrigue in the historically controversial character of Ira Allen, subsequently resolving that it was "a sacred duty to undertake the writing of his life." By 1920, Wilbur's collection of "Vermontiana" assisted him to begin writing Allen's biography, which was eventually published in 1928 as a two-volume work entitled: "Ira Allen: Founder of Vermont, 1751–1814". The work has been criticized as it purportedly relied solely upon the English language correspondence that Wilbur found while undertaking his research in Paris during the 1920s; thence missing sixteen french-language documents that refute Allen's long-standing claims of his motives pertaining to the Olive Branch affair.

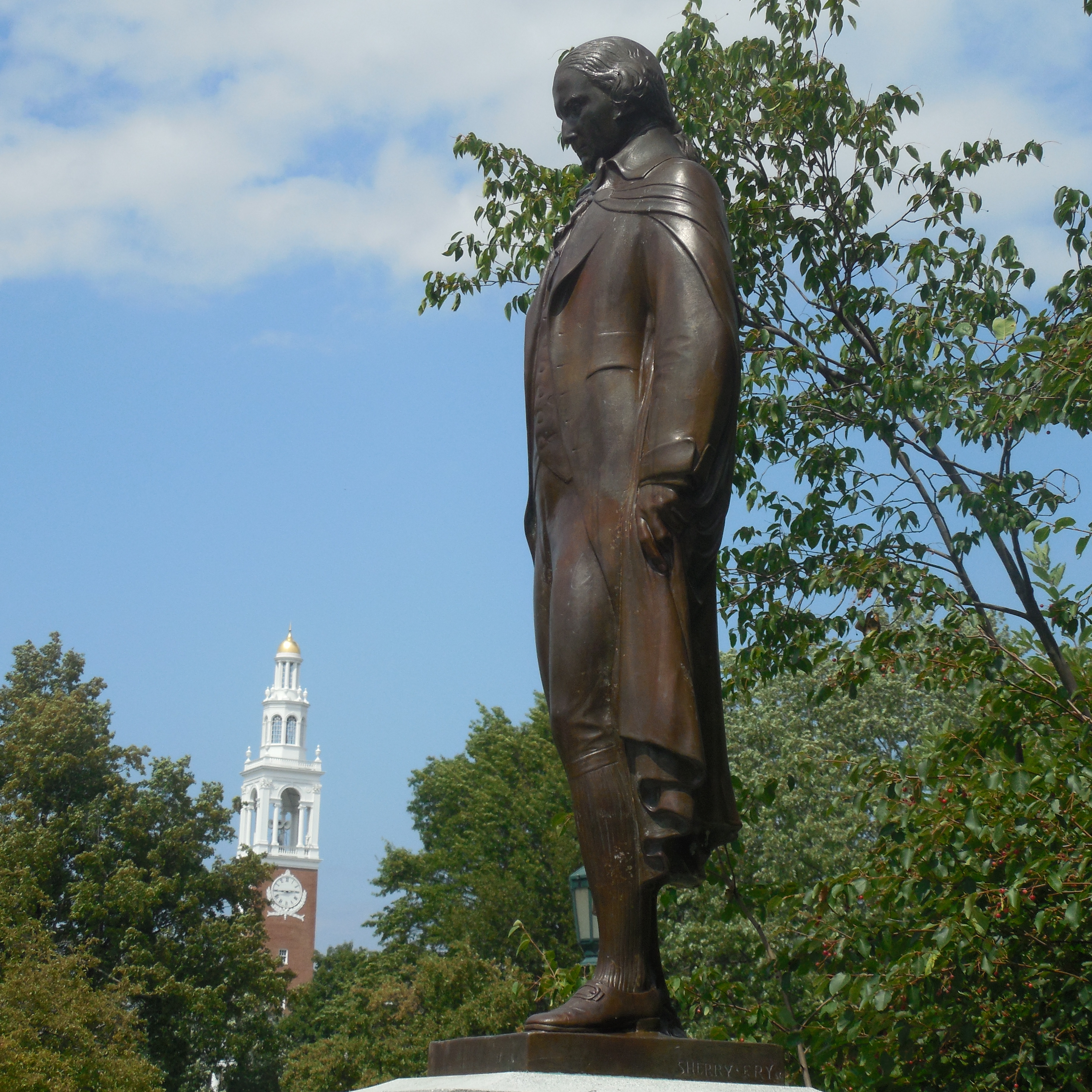
Ira Allen monument on the UVM Green (shown with the Ira Allen Chapel in the background)

In 1921, Wilbur first donated to the university a bronze statue monument of Ira Allen (sculpted by Sherry Edmundson Fry) upon a foundation of Barre Granite that was installed on the University Green in front of the university's "Old Mill" building facing west toward College Street and Lake Champlain. The monument to General Lafayette, which was originally installed at this location in 1883 was moved to the north end of "the Green" (in proximity to where the Ira Allen Chapel stands today).

In 1924, Wilbur proposed an offer to UVM's board of trustees to build a chapel on conditions; that it be named the "Ira Allen Chapel", and that the chapel be sited and designed by the university's consulting architects at the time; McKim, Mead & White of New York City. Of the preliminary plans for the chapel, Wilbur had expressed pause, stating that the "plans are artistic, but I am afraid too expensive for me.” Nevertheless, after reviewing them with other university administrators (Dean Josiah Votey, Dean Walter Crocket, and Professor Frederick Tupper) who felt that the plans were satisfactory, President Bailey placed an advertisement in the university’s Alumni Weekly newspaper intended to generate revenue to meet the possible shortfall. Wilbur hence pledged an additional $150,000, contingent upon the successful sale of a commensurate stock of timber from a property he owned on Vancouver Island. Wilbur officially announced the plans for the new chapel during a speech to the university’s board of trustees on June 21, 1924.

"I do all this out of respect for the memory of the one whom I consider Vermont's greatest and most neglected citizen, Ira Allen."

— James B. Wilbur, Proposal to the UVM Board of Trustees, 1924

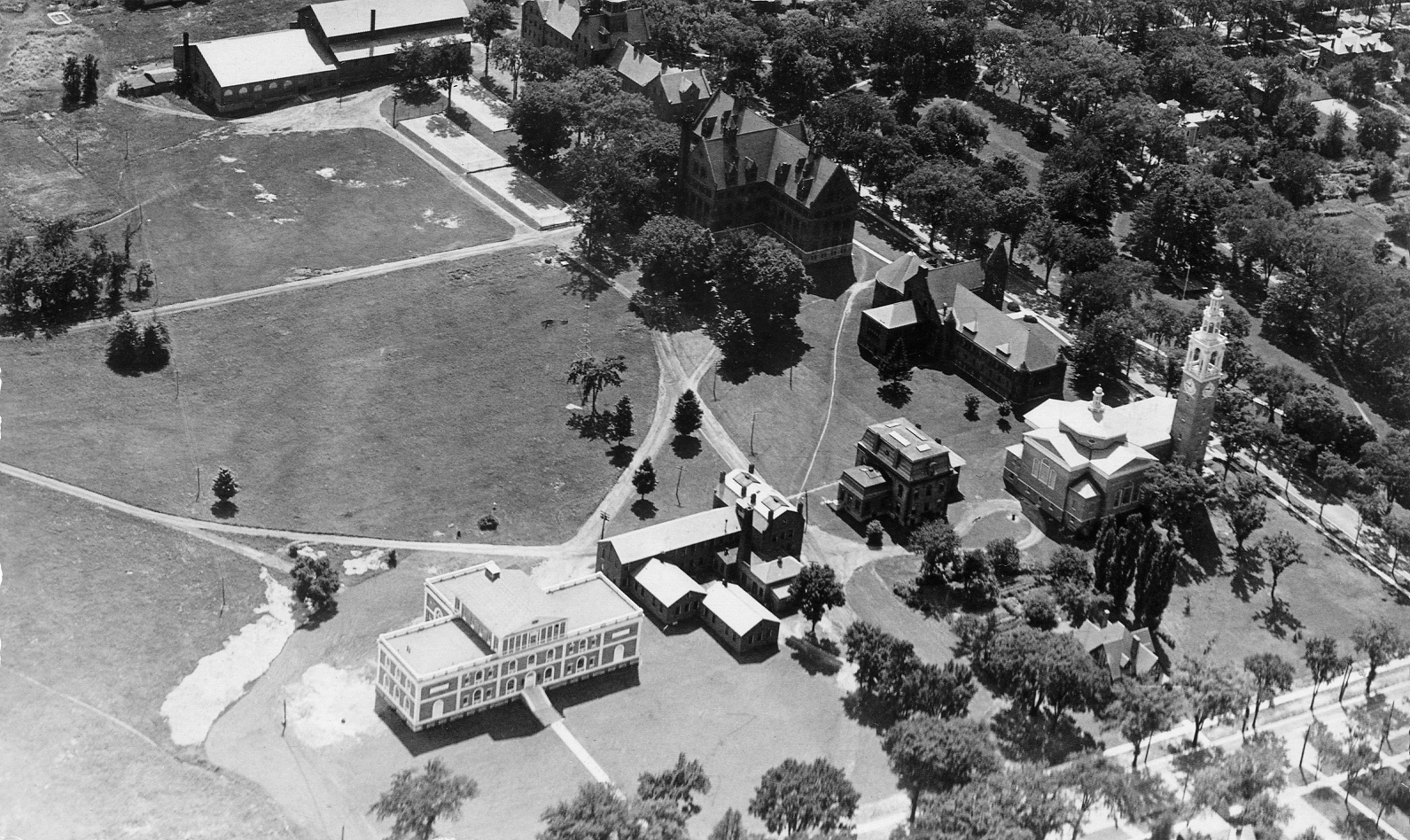
Aerial view of the rear facade of the Ira Allen Chapel (far right) and the Fleming Museum of Art (lower left), circa 1931

By 1929, Wilbur had also established a $3 million endowment scholarship for the University (which still exists today), and donated his personal Vermontiana collection to the university, today known as the Wilbur Collection, as well as a $100,000 provisional contribution for the construction of the Robert Hull Fleming Museum, and an additional $150,000 to construct the Wilbur room within the museum intended to house his collection. Up until this point in time he had become the largest private benefactor in the university's history. An ironic twist of fate lies in the fact that Ira Allen had left behind a damaged reputation with the university, having never followed up on his founding pledge of 4,000 pounds that was intended for the construction of the university's buildings. However, Wilbur's ineffable devotion to Allen over a century later suggests that compensation was made for his fiduciary lapses, at least within the context of the university's history.

During the years of Wilbur's contributions, university president Guy Winfred Bailey (1876-1940) served as Wilbur's principal handler.

=== Pipe organ ===
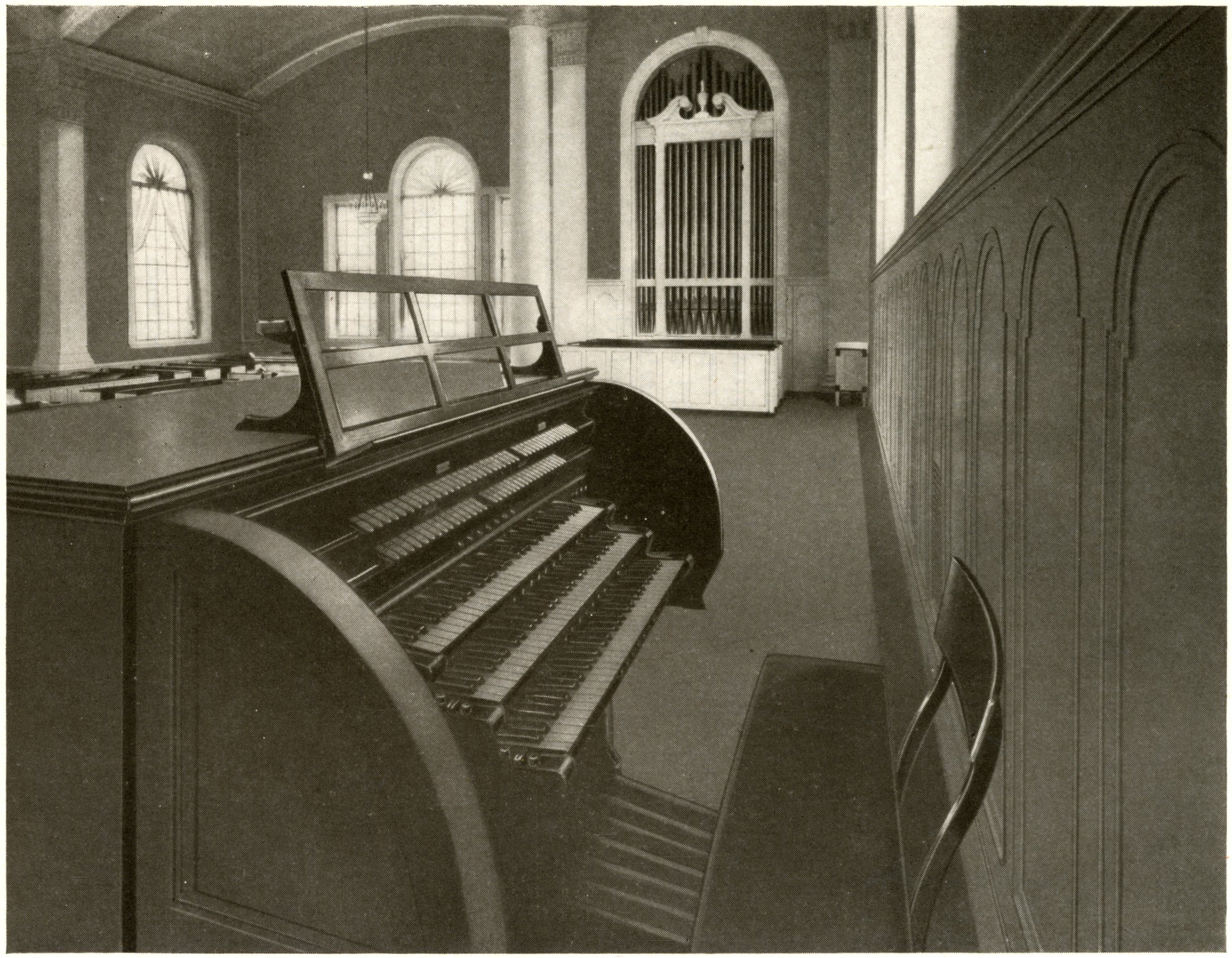
Philharmonic Pipe Organ installed at Ira Allen Chapel in 1927

The original organ installed in the Ira Allen Chapel was a three-manual, electro-pneumatic Welte-Mignon Philharmonic Pipe Organ. The manual compass was CC to C4 (61 notes). The pedal compass was CCC to G (32 notes). The wind chests of the manuals featured super-octave couplers (4'), which extended the compass of the keyboards to 73 notes. There was also installed a reproducing console, which played recorded rolls in detail utilizing pedals, swells, and tempo characteristics of renown organists.

During the chapel's dedication ceremony of January 14, 1927, the organ was played by Dr. T. Tertius Noble, the organist of St. Thomas' Church of New York, who concluded the event with two organ recitals composed of classical pieces, and an original piece that was said to have demonstrated the capabilities of the instrument.

"The work was a study in harmony and scanty use of solo stops. A few arpeggios with the harp stop were most effectively used."

— Vermont Alumni Weekly, January 1927

In 1985, the pipe organ was removed due to building renovations requiring the installation of a new airshaft in place of the organ's pipes. The installation of a new pipe organ was estimated to cost in the millions of dollars, and was further anticipated to have complications due to the effect of varying temperature and humidity on the organ's intonation system. The prospect was thus determined to be cost-prohibitive. However, in August 2004, a new Rogers Trillium 3 digital electronic organ was installed (costing about $100,000). Organ enthusiasts have argued against the authenticity of the digitally re-created pipe organ sound.

=== The University's desire for a new Chapel ===
Chapel services on the university's campus from the 1830s onward were held in the chapel of the Main College building underneath its formerly erected central dome, in what is today known as the John Dewey Lounge. Although the chapel was enlarged during the 1882–83 modernization and renovation of the Main College building, throughout the ensuing 45 years the student population continued to grow beyond its capacity. Furthermore, the inadequate heating system of the facility could not sufficiently heat the room for an "8:00 or 8:30 am service", which up to that point in time was a compulsory obligation.

By the early 1900s, attendance at the chapel services had become greatly reduced much to the dismay of the sitting university president of the day, Matthew Henry Buckham. Although the president was said to have hated the word "compulsory", he nevertheless felt that everyone should attend chapel services. However, this was impossible due to the chapel's limited capacity. In 1910, a compulsory chapel attendance rule was enacted by the university, which mandated that all students attend services at least three times per week. The rule was seen by the administration as a benefit to the school because all of the departments were regularly brought together. Further, the administration had an intention that someday daily attendance would be made possible by the fulfillment of what was then viewed as "one of the university's greatest needs"; a new chapel.

Soon after Buckham's passing in November 1910, it was reported in a university periodical that a memorial to Matthew Henry Buckham ought take the shape of a chapel; "It would be fitting, however, if in the coming years there shall be erected by the side of Morrill Hall, commemorating the service of a son of Vermont whom he loved, a memorial chapel bearing his name..."

Although this vision was never realized, it was decided that Ira Allen Chapel would be built on the same spot where for almost 40 years, president Buckham had lived and worked (i.e. Angell House). By the time of Ira Allen Chapel's design, it was intended that it serve as a meeting place to accommodate the entire student body, using reported figures from 1923 totaling 1,146 students.

== Architecture ==
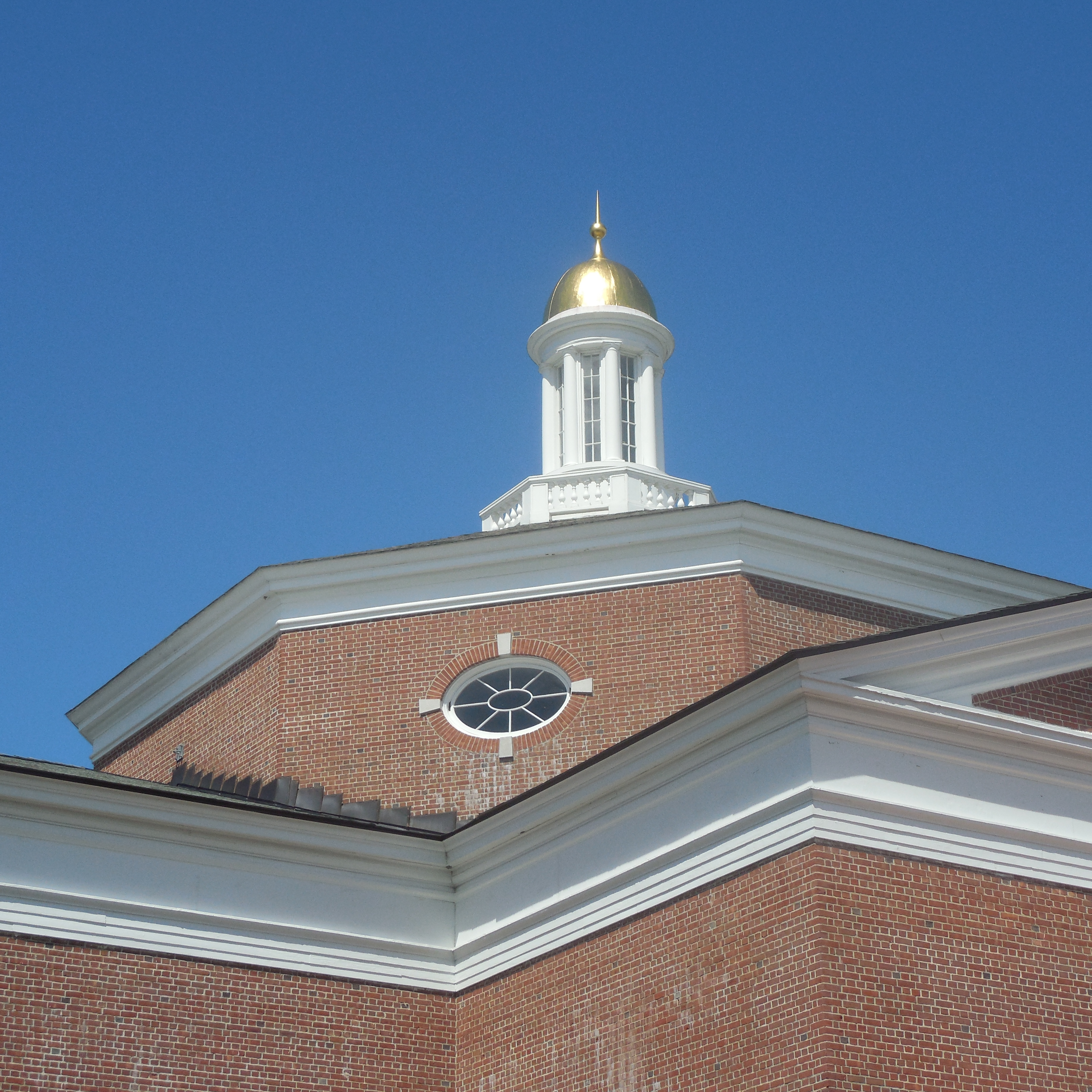
Octagonal dome extending 40 ft. above the roof of the Ira Allen Chapel (from the south)

The building's footprint was constructed in the shape of a Latin cross. There is a 170 ft. high (by 20 ft^{2}) bell tower offset to the northwest corner of the nave of the main structure that is fitted with four clocks (one for each side of the tower) measuring eight feet in diameter. At night, the beams from the electric lamp on the top tier of the tower are said to be visible from Mount Mansfield to the east (the highest summit in Vermont) to Mount Marcy from the west (the highest summit in the Adirondack mountains of New York State).

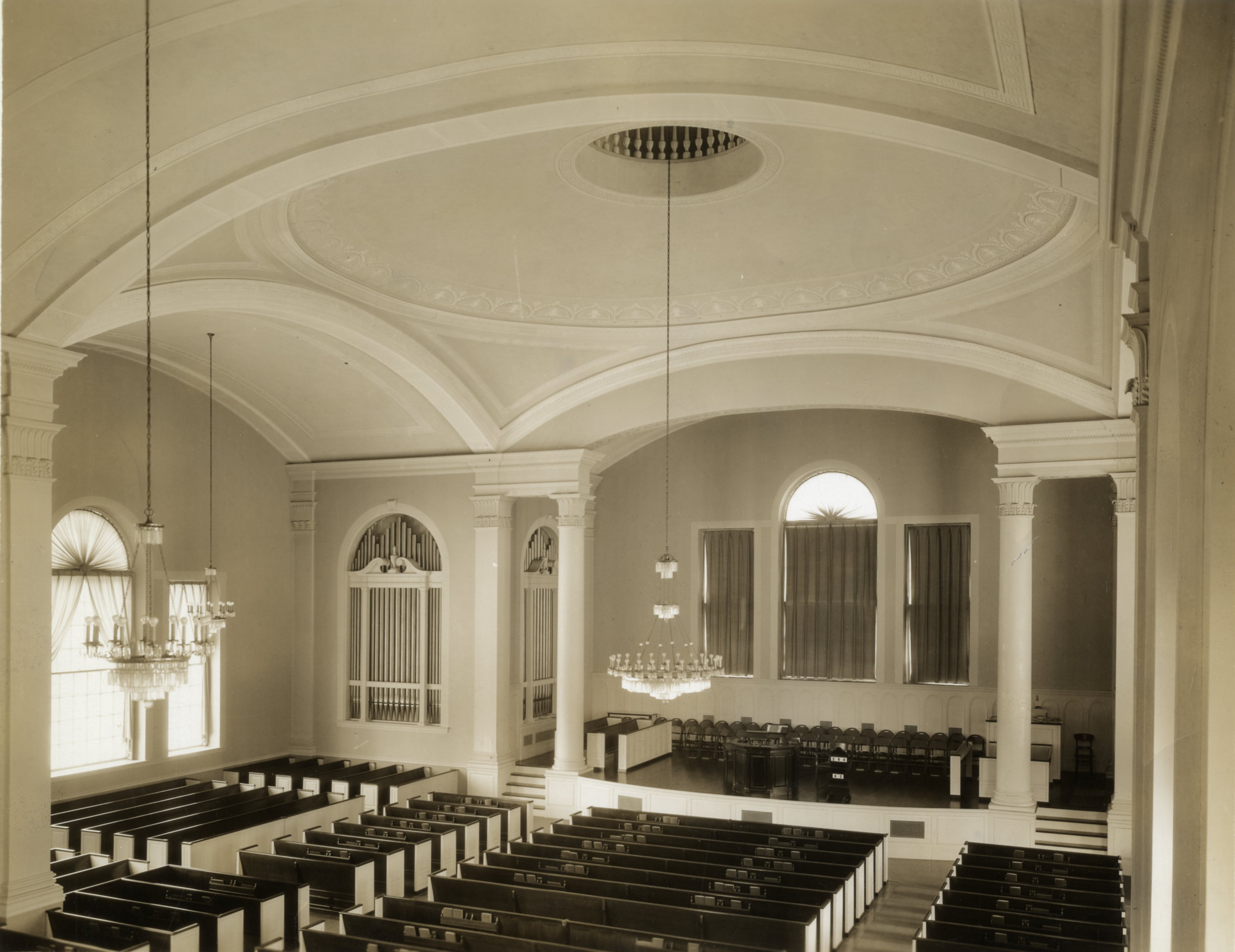
Historical interior view of the Ira Allen Chapel from the balcony

The length of the nave runs roughly east–west for 135 ft. at a 50 ft. width. The 46 foot wide transepts of "the cross" extend perpendicular from the nave structure (i.e. north-south) for 20' 6". Hence, the width of the main structure totals about 90 ft. The floor area of the building is 39,141 ft^{2} (gross area) and 26,532 ft^{2} (finished area). The main structure is 40 ft. high and has a slate roof. Extending an additional 40 ft. above the roof and from the center of the building (e.g. the intersection of the nave and the transepts) is a low octagonal dome topped with a lantern and golden cupola.

The building was constructed using locally manufactured brick (from the Drury Brick and Tile Company of Essex Junction, Vermont) laid in Flemish bond with ivory colored trim and topped with a gray-green slate roof. The face of the main structure was fashioned in Greek Revival style with a portico installed with six 32 ft. Ionic columns. The portico's pediment has a central traced elliptical window and flanking white swags. Barre granite steps (roughly the width of the nave) ascend to the front entrance, which consists of three large doors leading to the inner vestibule. The auditorium seats about 1,100 people, including 200 in the balconies. The eastern facade of the building has a basement level which is five bays wide.

Much of the design of the building credited to William M. Kendall, a senior partner in the firm McKim, Mead & White, which utilized a "Palladian clarity of massing" and design elements reminiscent of the University of Virginia campus at Charlottesville, augmented with a New England thematic character of an "inventive eclecticism; flattened, linear crispness; and light decorativeness."

== Additions and maintenance ==
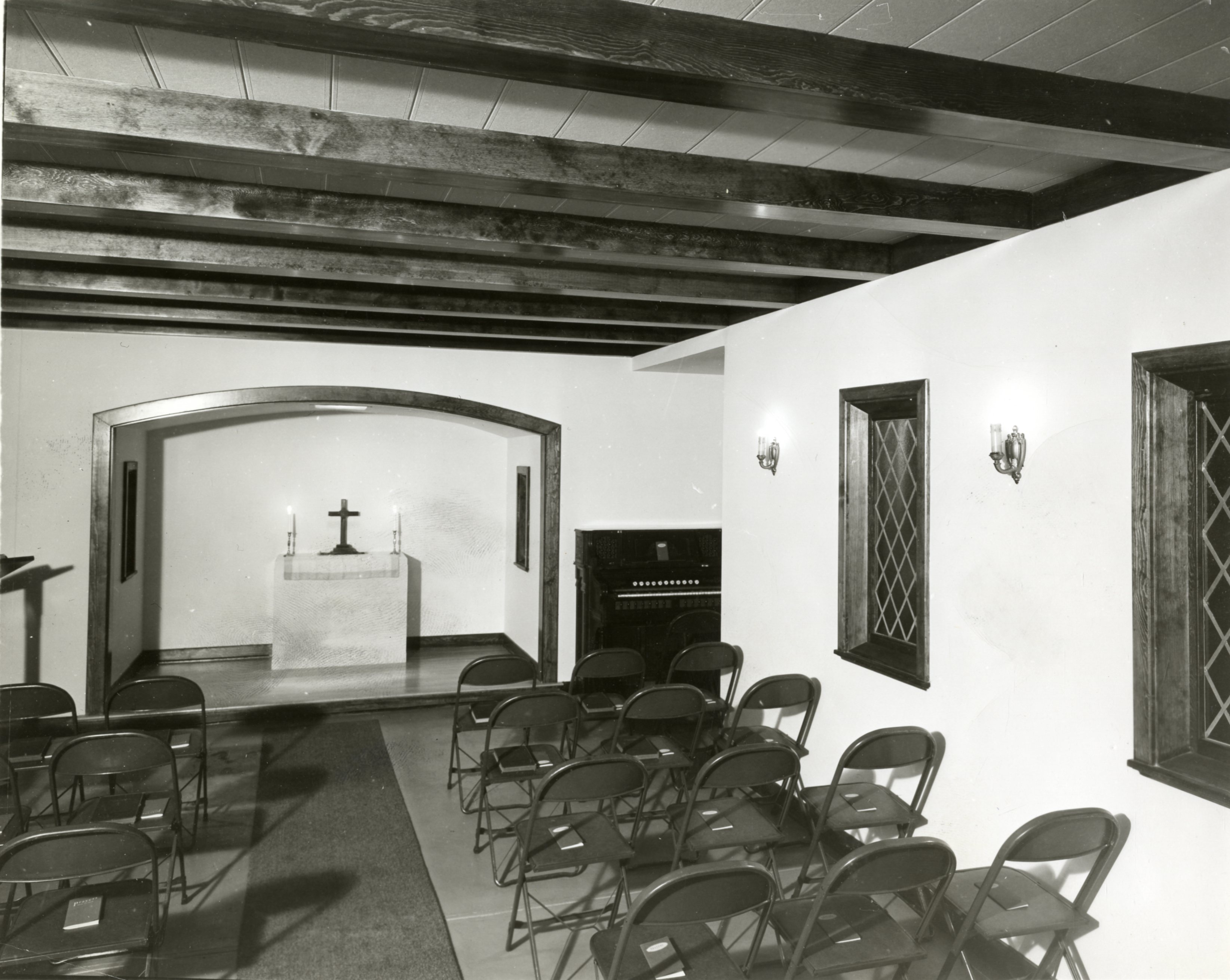
The "Little Chapel" within the basement of the Ira Allen Chapel, circa 1957

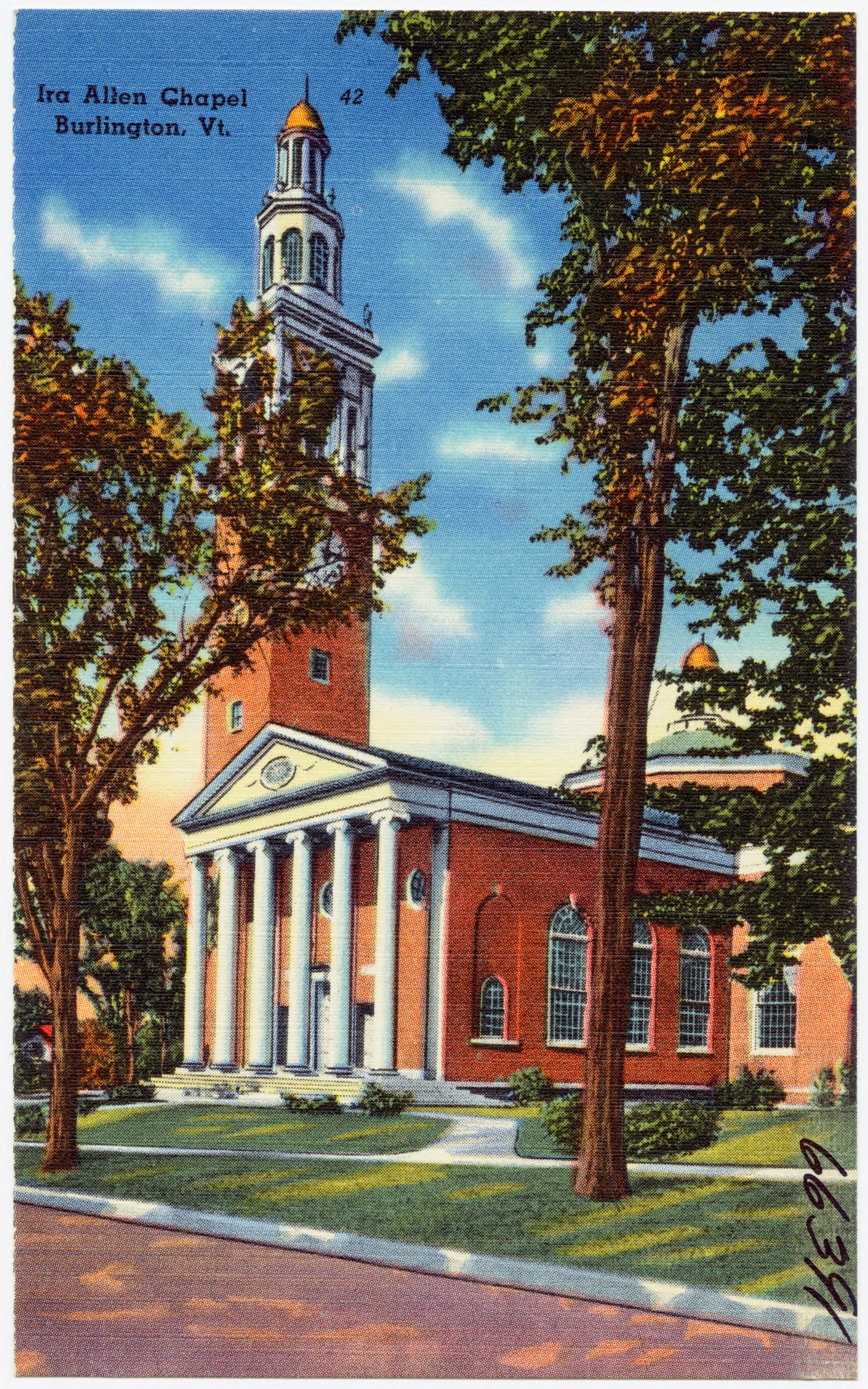
Postcard of the Ira Allen Chapel, University of Vermont, circa 1930–1945

In 1945, the "Little Chapel" was constructed in the basement underneath the southern transept. It was considered to be an architectural unit complete with cathedral glass, beamed ceiling, chancel floor, and leaded windows. During 1954-55, the "Little Chapel" was renovated through the efforts of the Rev. Raymond A. Hall (a faculty member of the English department who was made the university chaplain in 1952) and with contributions from Mrs. and Mr. John E. Booth (who were primary contributors for the little chapel in 1945). It was upgraded with a dossal, brass altar set, and a new lectern. The chapel was built in cruciform with stained glass windows through which artificial light was cast. With a seating capacity for about 40 people, the facility served as a worship center for numerous groups on campus. However, on October 19, 1957, UVM's board of trustees voted to discontinue weekly chapel services held each Wednesday and replaced them with a weekly university convocation. The decision was reached after a legal investigation concluded that such use of university facilities was technically a violation of the 3rd amendment of the Constitution of Vermont, which held that ". . . no man ought to, or of right can be compelled to attend any religious worship, or erect or support any place of worship, or maintain any minister, contrary to the dictates of his conscience. . ."

Due to the fact that UVM received funds from the State of Vermont as a state university, the use of tax dollars for support of religious services could have been construed as compelling the taxpayers to support a place of worship. The trustees further concluded that the primary use of the university's facilities ought to be for educational purposes with the allowance for denominational groups to utilize available facilities for worship services on campus provided they are billed for associated costs, such as; heat, lighting, custodial services, and depreciation.

On October 17, 1953, an electronic carillon was dedicated in the Ira Allen Chapel. It was the first such carillon with the capability for tuning in both major and minor tonality, and which allowed for the carillonneur to vary the tonal coloring according to harmonic requirements. Up to this point, electronic carillons could only be tuned to one tonality, thus preventing their bells from sounding in tune at all times. The device consisted of eight large speakers mounted above the bells in the tower, a console with two manuals and 64 bells at the base of the tower, and four 50 watt amplifiers housed in the basement. The $5,000 instrument was presented to the University by the Interfraternity Council and dedicated to UVM students who had fallen in combat while in service to their country. However, the allotted funding for the carillon was obtained from proceeds of the ill-famed annual Kake Walk winter carnival event, a racist tradition which had its origins at the university during the mid-1880s (or prior). The event was officially ended on November 1, 1969. The carillon was replaced in 1986.

While making major repairs to the chapel in 1954, a group of workers were trapped within the tower for four hours due to high winds that prevented their climbing down.

In June 1966, the outside of the chapel and bell tower were repainted and a new gold leaf was applied over the tower dome cupola; a project which had cost $6,000.

During 1971, renovations were made to the interior, which included extensive acoustical remodeling, enlargement of the stage area, and the addition of new seating (at an estimated cost of $500,000).

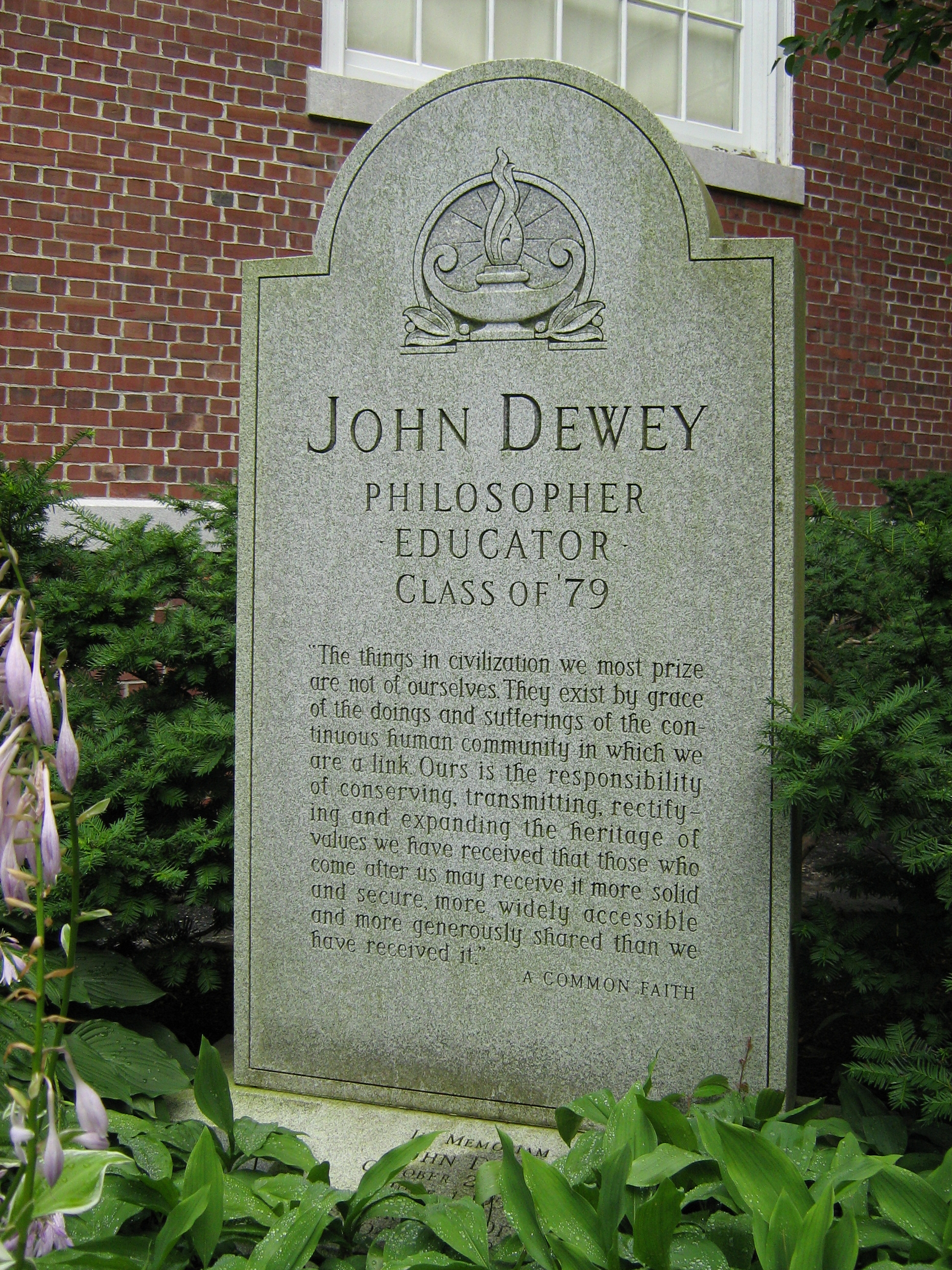
Gravesite of John Dewey and wife Roberta on the north side of the Chapel, 2013

In 1972, the urn containing the ashes of Burlington native and world-renowned American philosopher and educational reformer John Dewey (UVM class of 1879), as well as the remains of his wife, Roberta Dewey were interred at a memorial adjacent to the north side of the building. This is the only known grave site on the UVM campus.

In 1981, one of the original cornices had rotted out to about 25% of its original material. It required Moose Creek Restoration a month to recreate the carved edifice in plaster and epoxy coating (weighing 200 pounds).

In early 1982, each of the four of the clocks on the tower had been displaying different times. The University commissioned Pat Boyden (UVM class of 1967) to rebuild the clock mechanism and replace the clock hands with a lighter aluminum material. Boyden further donated new hour and minute markings for the clocks.

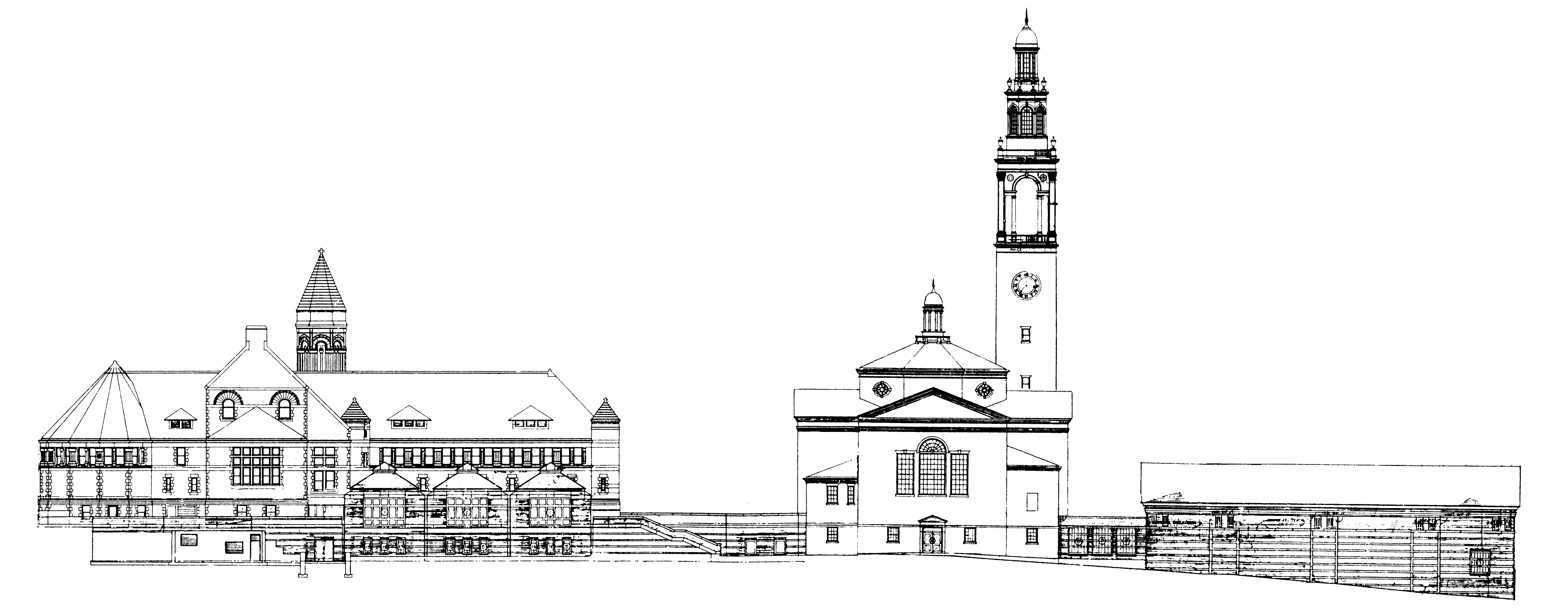
1986 schematic of the Billings–Ira Allen Campus Center & Campus Center Theatre

During 1984-1986, major improvements totaling 30,000 square feet were made to the Ira Allen Chapel and Billings Library building, forming a combined Ira Allen–Billings Student Center. A wing was constructed abutting the south transept of the Ira Allen Chapel at the basement level. The roof of the wing serves as a patio adjoining the chapel to Billings. An additional building known as the Campus Center Theatre was constructed, which abuts part of the north transept of the Chapel. The back entrance of the theatre is accessible from the rear vestibule of Ira Allen Chapel. The roof of the entryway serves as an open terrace and also connects the two buildings together. It is accessible from the back of the auditorium (i.e. the first floor) of Ira Allen Chapel and from stairways from the east, and the north. The front entrance of the Campus Center Theatre faces north toward Colchester Avenue. These additions were designed by the architectural firm Shepley, Bulfinch, Richardson, and Abbott.

Subsequently, the basement of the Ira Allen Chapel was converted into a production area for the Vermont Cynic newspaper, the Aerial yearbook, and the Burlington Review publication. The chapel was further outfitted with theatrical lighting, an enlarged stage area, and additional fire exits. Also during this period, a new carillon was installed, replacing the 1953 instrument. The new instrument had a range of almost four full octaves comprising 40 pitched tuning rods, which were played from a two-tiered keyboard located in the chapel's choir loft.

In 1990, an extensive rehabilitation project of the bell tower took place, which consisted of stabilization and repainting of the tower and the belfry.

During the autumn of 2018, the original 32 foot spanish cedar columns of the main facade were removed and disposed due to deterioration; and the Barre granite stairway was demolished for refurbishment. The university attempted to replace the columns with replicated steel support pillars encased in fiberglass. However, as the university's historic structures were subject to the Vermont Act 250 land use statute, the Natural Resources Board, acting as the State's enforcement agency issued a letter ordering the university to cease construction work in January 2019; after six steel columns had been erected, but installed with only the leftmost four fiberglass sheaths (without any of the capitals or bases). After the issuance of a mitigation agreement with the Vermont Division for Historic Preservation to address the substantial disparity of the replacement building materials from the original materials, and the subsequent approval of the Act 250 District Coordinator, the project was completed by installing wooden sheaths around the steel pillars during the spring of 2020.

Although Ira Allen Chapel is no longer used for religious services, the facility hosts special campus events and ceremonies and has further been visited by notable speakers.

== Notable appearances ==
- Rosalyn Pelles, Civil rights activist and survivor of the 1979 Greensboro Massacre (January 29, 2026)
- Anne Applebaum, Journalist and historian (November 13, 2025)
- Ada Limón, 24th United States Poet Laureate and National Book Award finalist (November 4, 2025)
- Sonia Sotomayor, U.S. Supreme Court Justice (October 20, 2025)
- Camille Dungy, American Poet and Professor (October 18, 2023)
- Senator Bernie Sanders, U.S. Senator (May 22, 2022)
- Michele Norris, American radio journalist (January 25, 2016)
- Al Gore, Former U.S. Vice-President (October 6, 2015)
- Salman Rushdie, Author (January 14, 2015)
- Billy Collins, Poet (October 2, 2013)
- Slavoj Zizek, Marxist philosopher (October 16, 2012)
- Bill McKibben, Environmental Journalist (October 13, 2012)
- Sierra Leone's Refugee All Stars, Musical band (April 6, 2010)
- Senator Barack Obama, U.S. Senator (March 10, 2006)
- Matt Nathanson, Singer/Songwriter (January 20, 2006)
- Mike Gordon and Leo Kottke, Musicians (November 5, 2002)
- Widespread Panic, Rock band (March 9, 1994)
- Turtle Island String Quartet, Jazz string quartet (March 30, 1990)
- G. Gordon Liddy and Timothy Leary debate titled: "The Mind of the State vs. The State of the Mind" (March 7, 1990)
- Spike Lee, film director, producer, writer, and actor (February 2, 1990)
- Pearl Williams-Jones, Gospel singer (October 6, 1989)
- Jesse Jackson, Politician, minister, and civil rights activist; and Mayor Bernie Sanders, Politician (February 11, 1988)
- Elie Wiesel, Holocaust survivor, writer, and activist (October 13, 1987)
- Russell Means, American Indian Movement Leader (September 11, 1986)
- Jerry Brown, Politician (November 27, 1979)
- Angela Davis, Political activist and author (September 28, 1979) and (March 25, 2010)
- Jerry Rubin, Social activist and counterculture figure (September 28, 1978)
- Gary Graffman, Classical pianist (July 8, 1970)

== Gallery ==
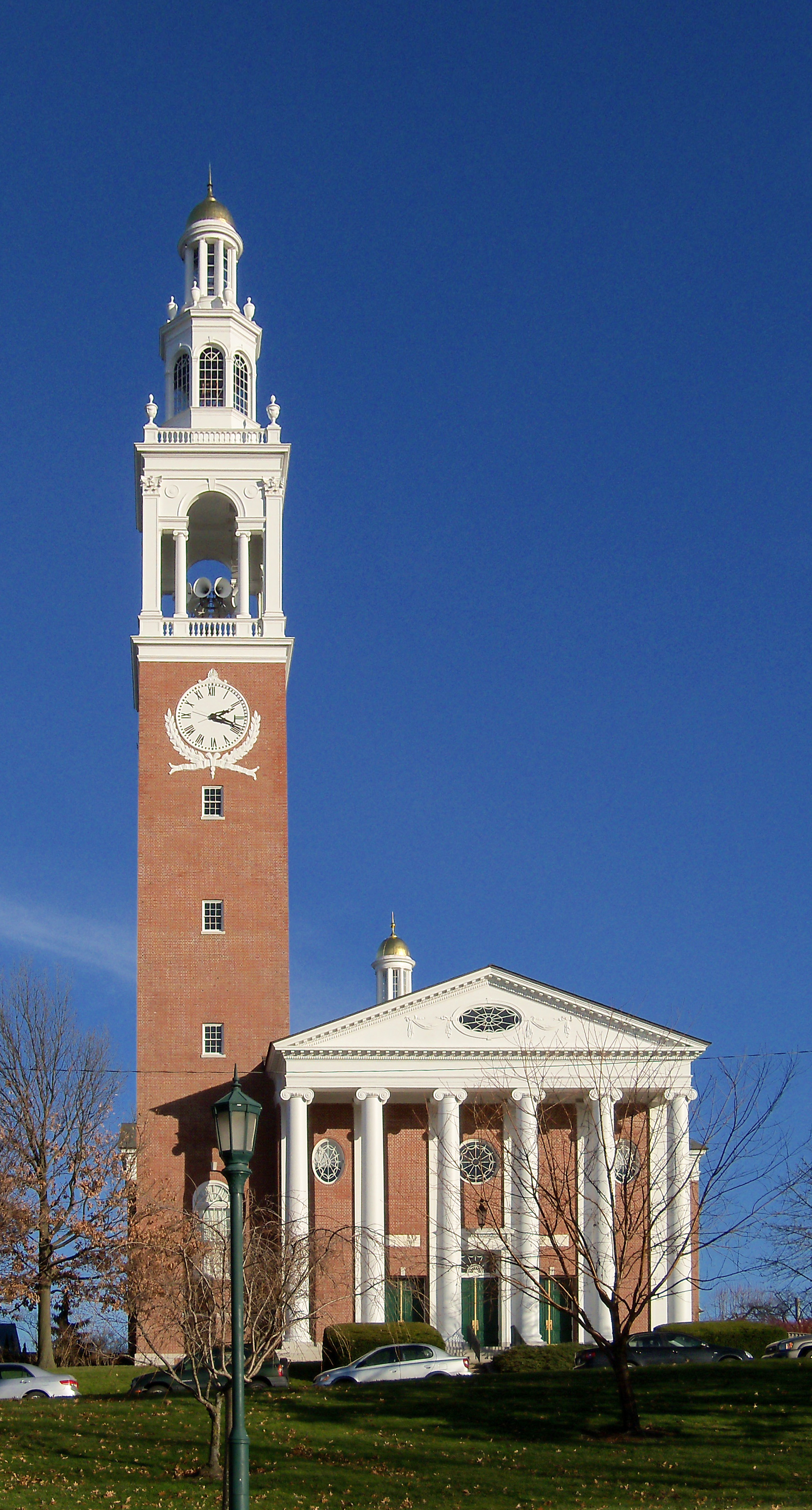
Front view of Ira Allen Chapel from the University Green: Dec 2012

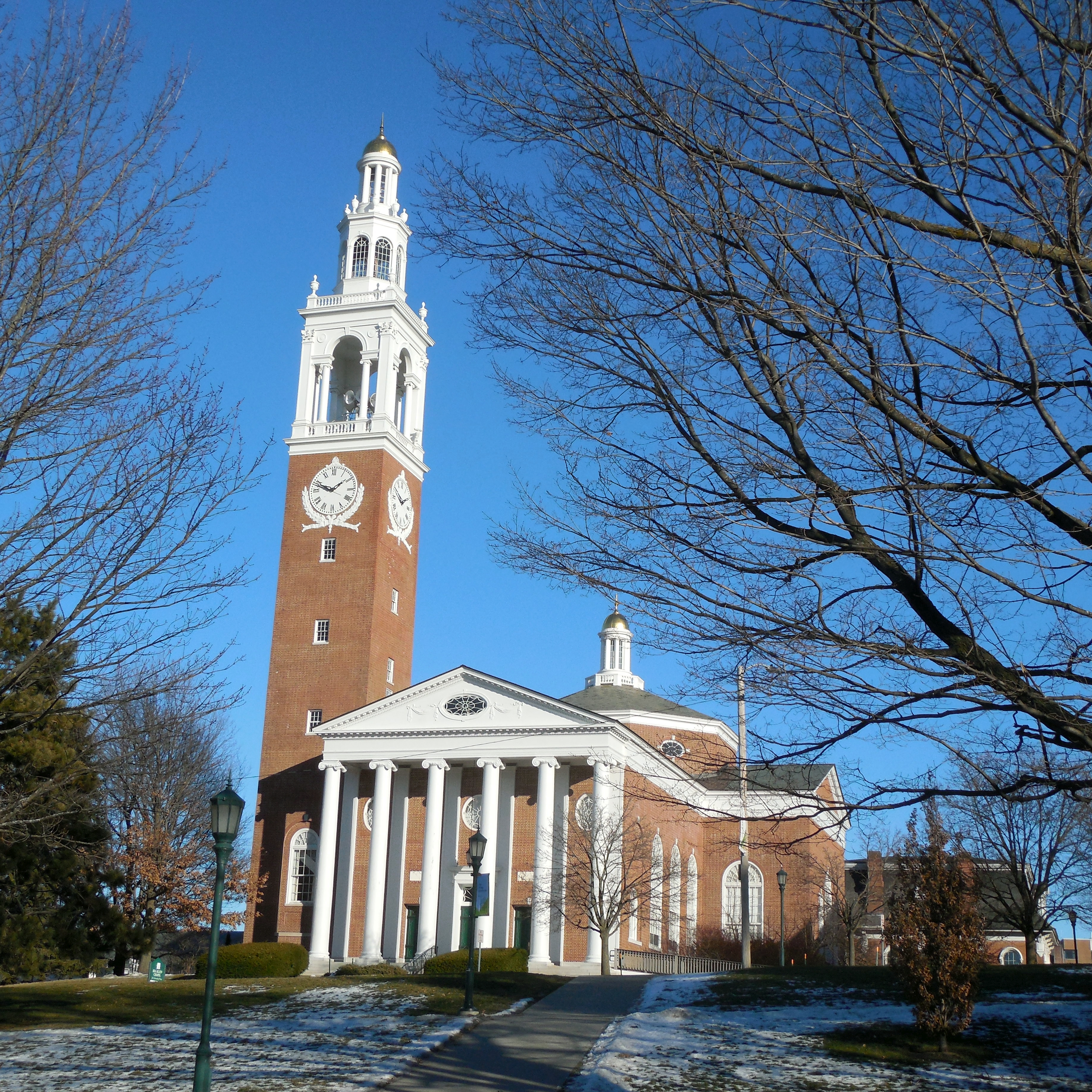
Southeastern view of Ira Allen Chapel from the University Green: Dec 2016

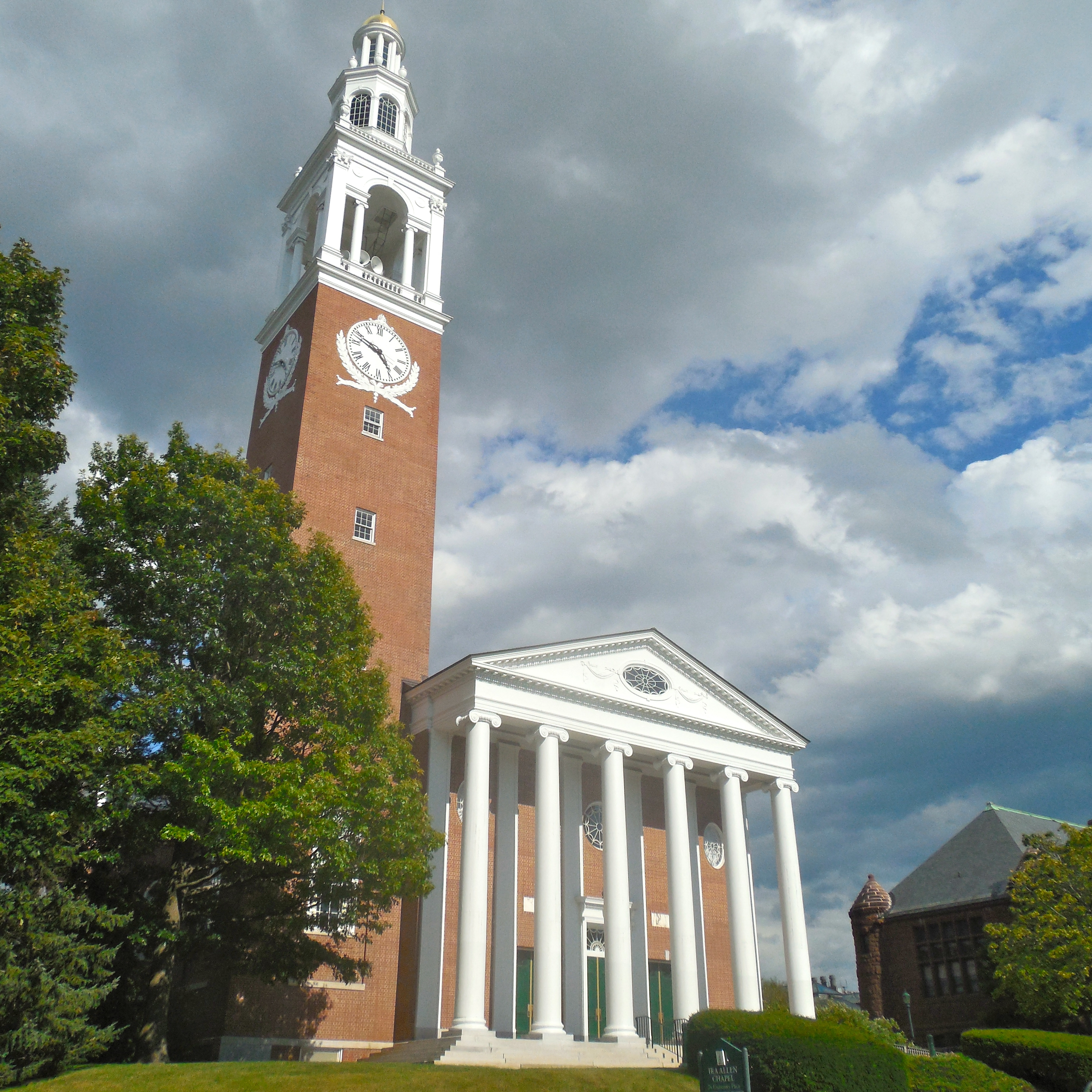
(Northeastern) Frontal view of Ira Allen Chapel: Jul 2015

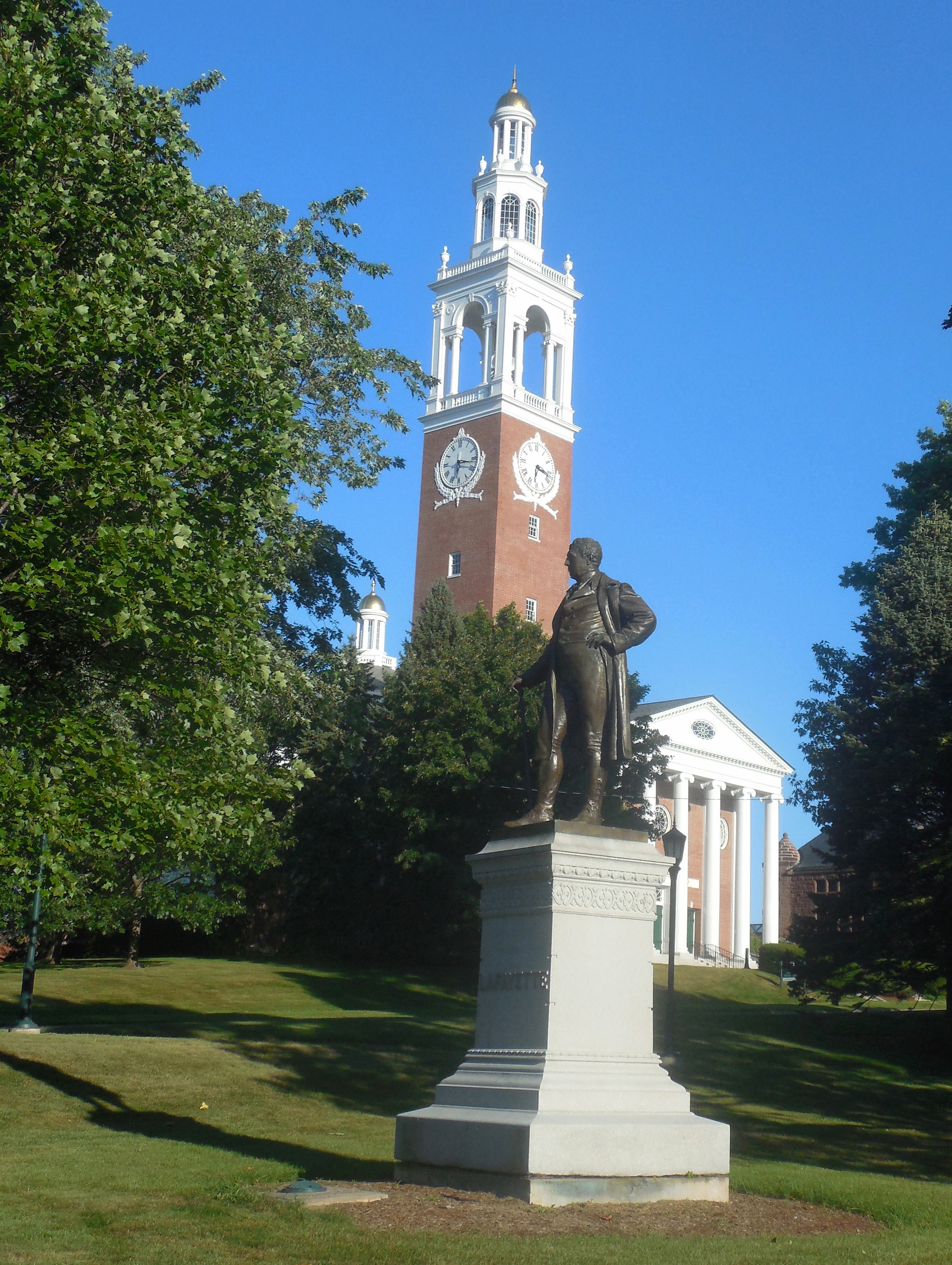
Statue of General Lafayette in front of the Ira Allen Chapel

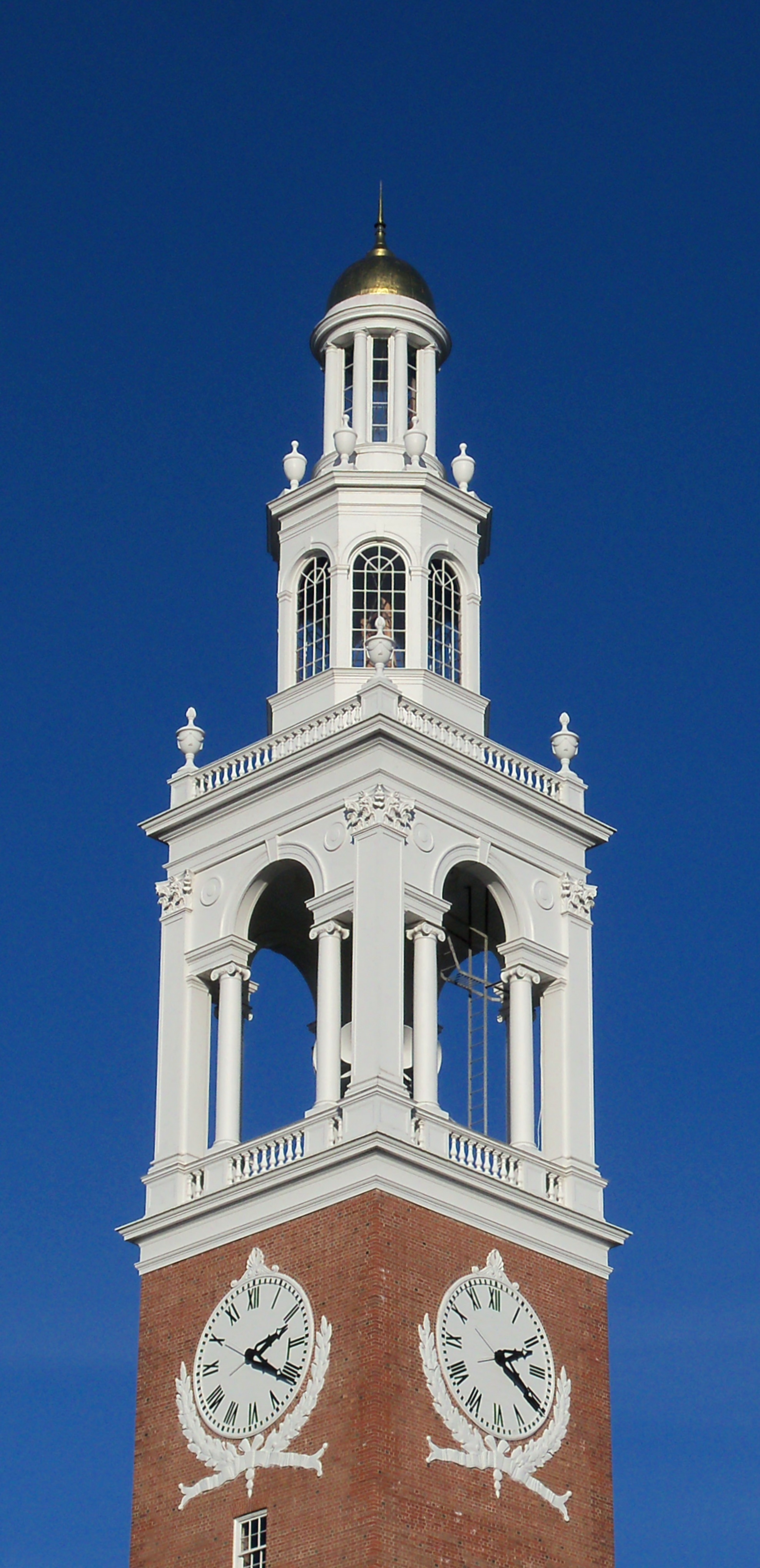
Bell Tower of the Ira Allen Chapel: Dec 2012

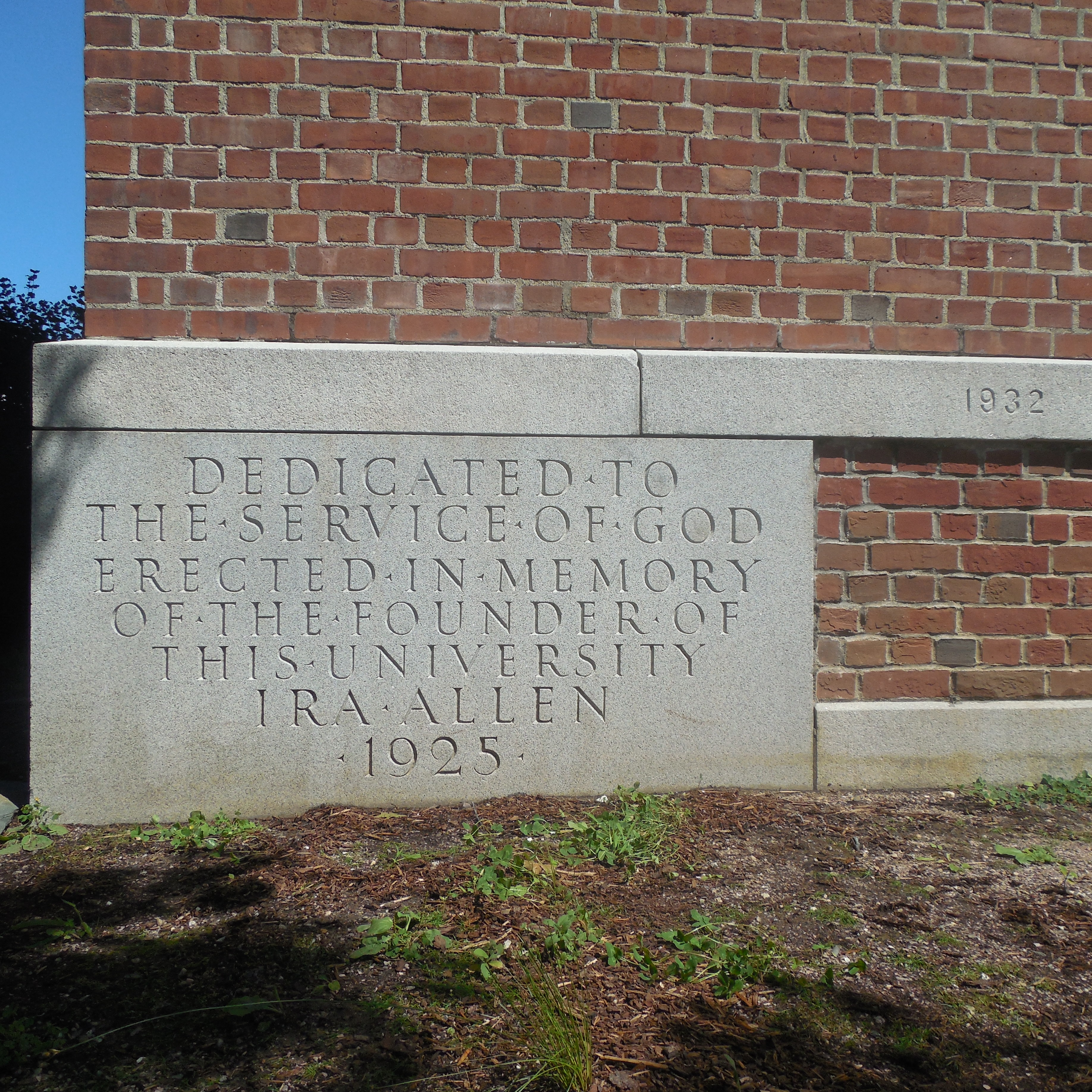
Cornerstone of the Ira Allen Chapel

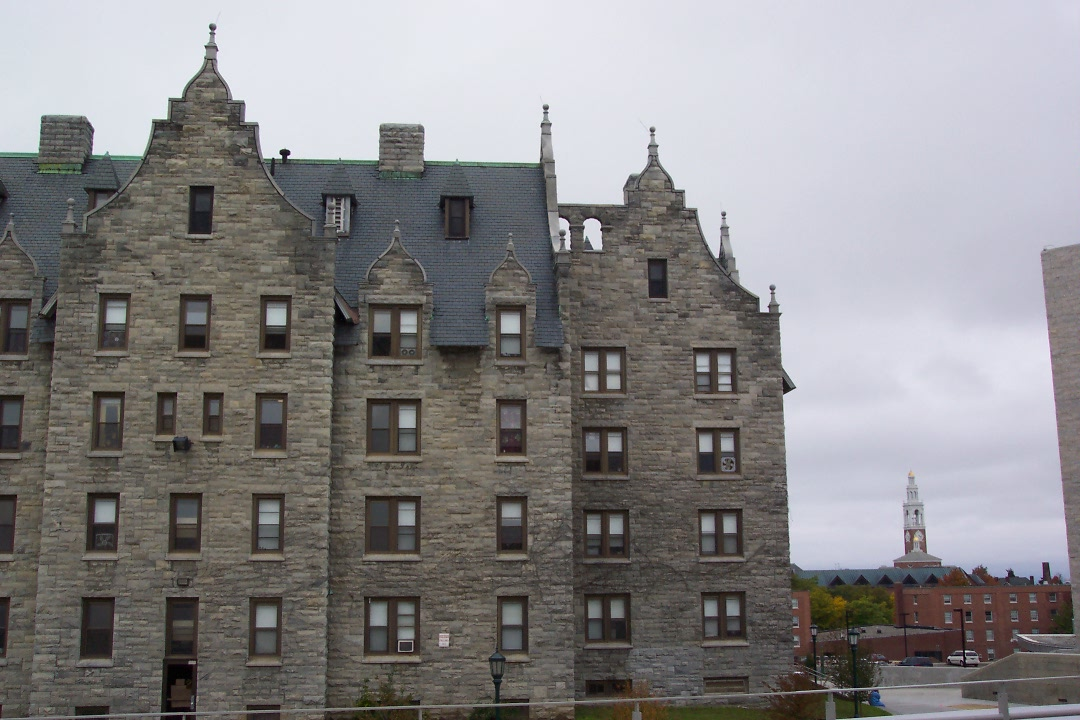
View of the Ira Allen Chapel Bell Tower from Converse Hall (to the east): Oct 2005

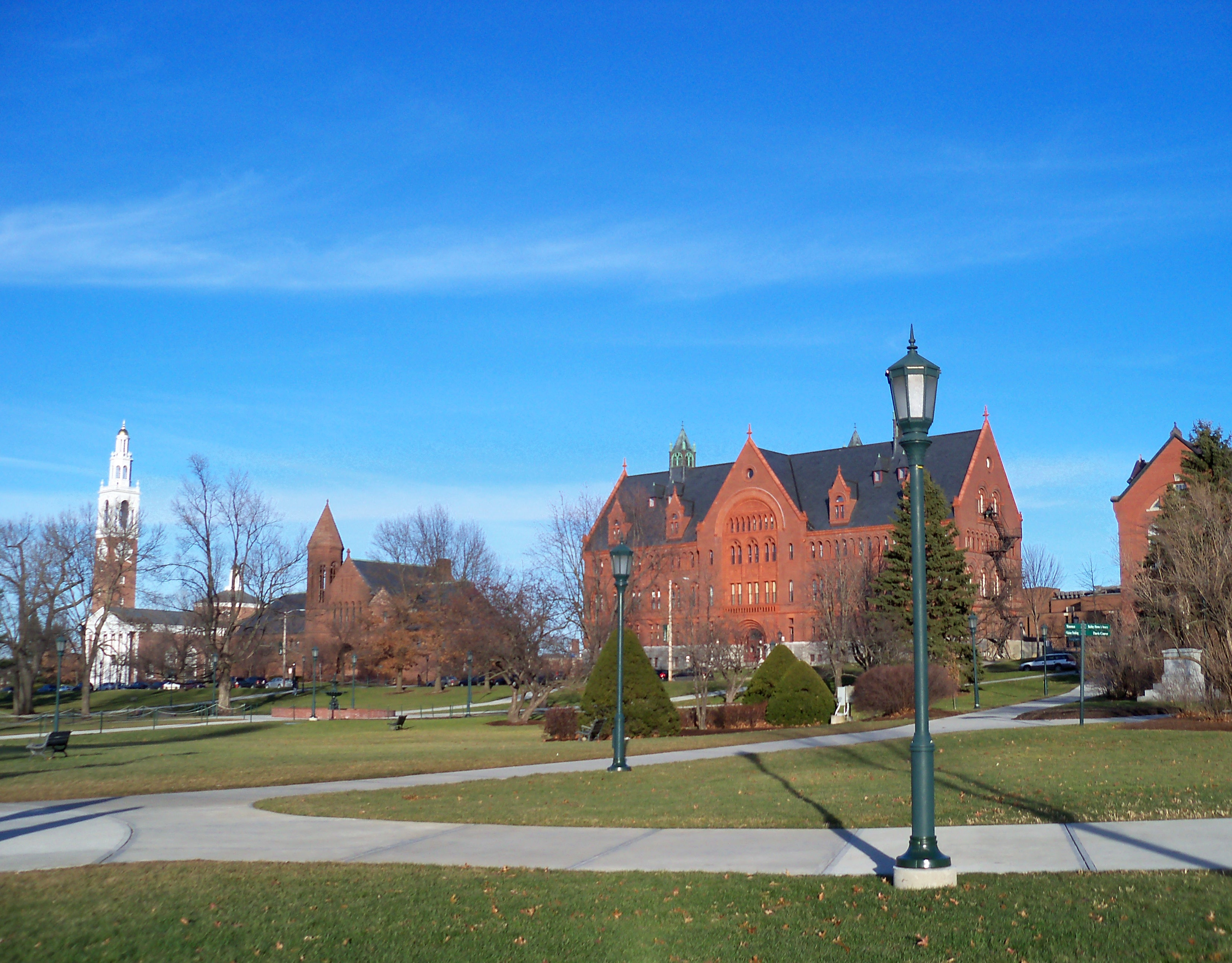
Eastern view (across the University Green) of Ira Allen Chapel: Dec 2012

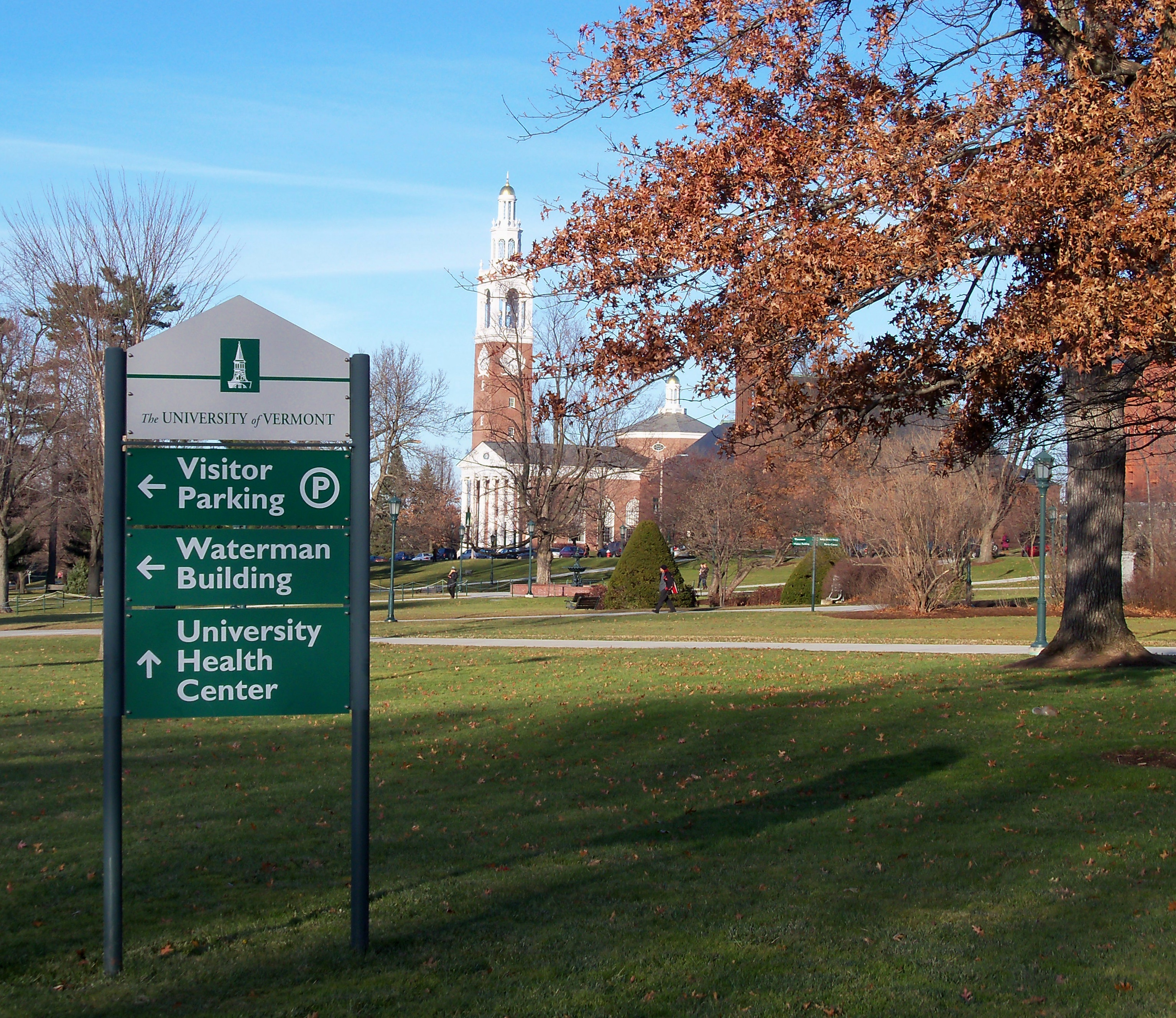
Southeastern view of Ira Allen Chapel: Dec 2012

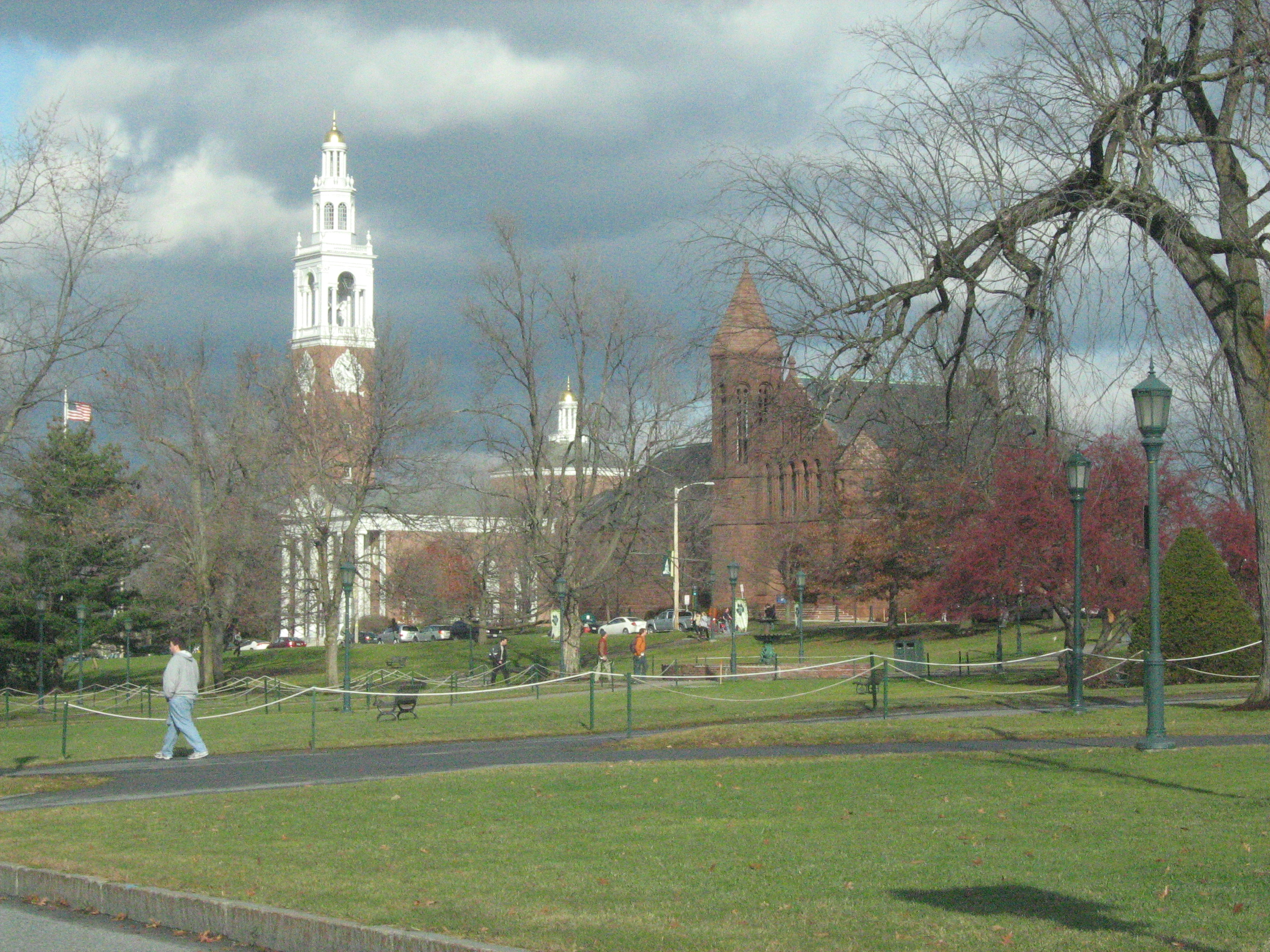
Southeastern view of Ira Allen Chapel: Nov 2009

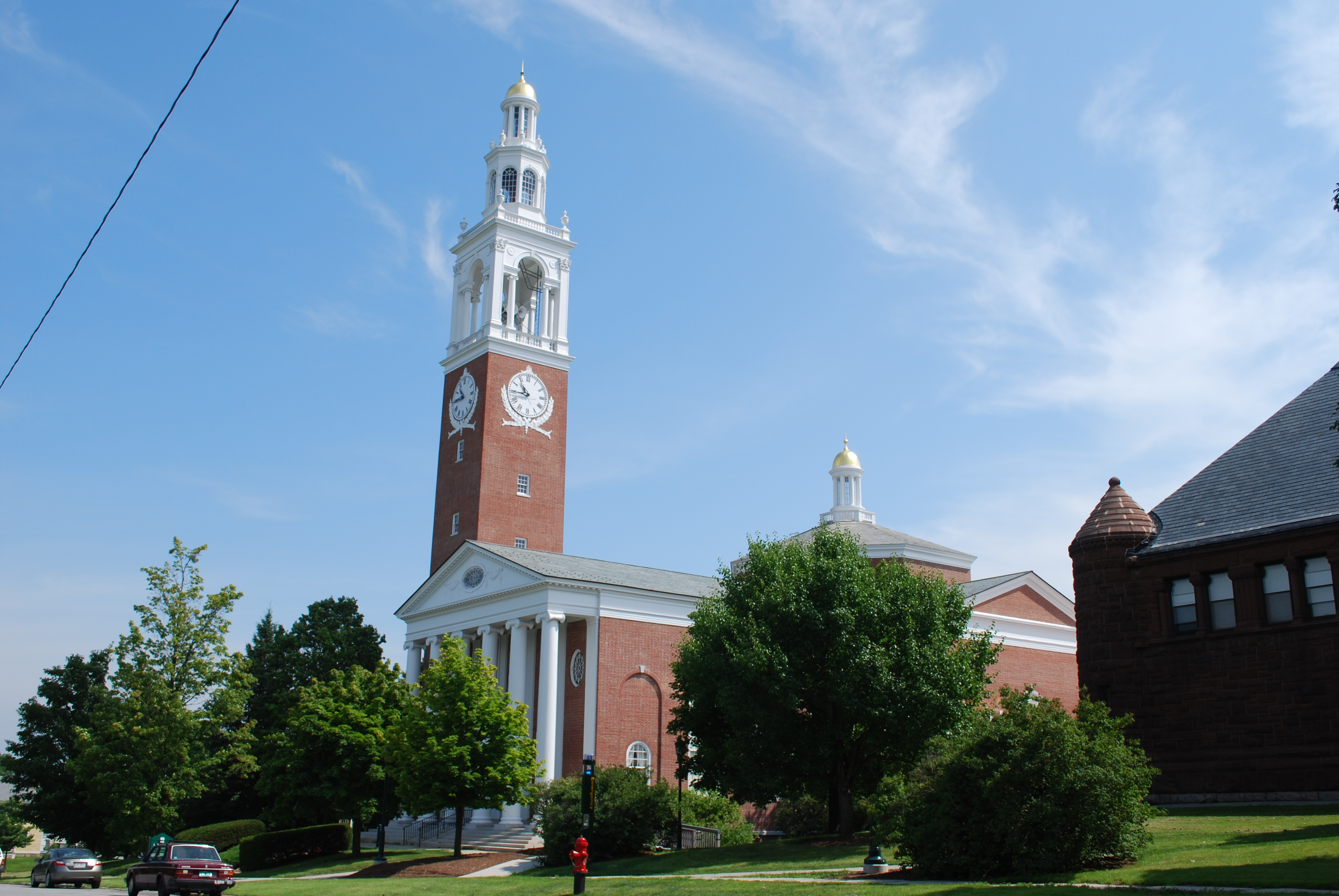
Ira Allen Chapel: Jul 2009

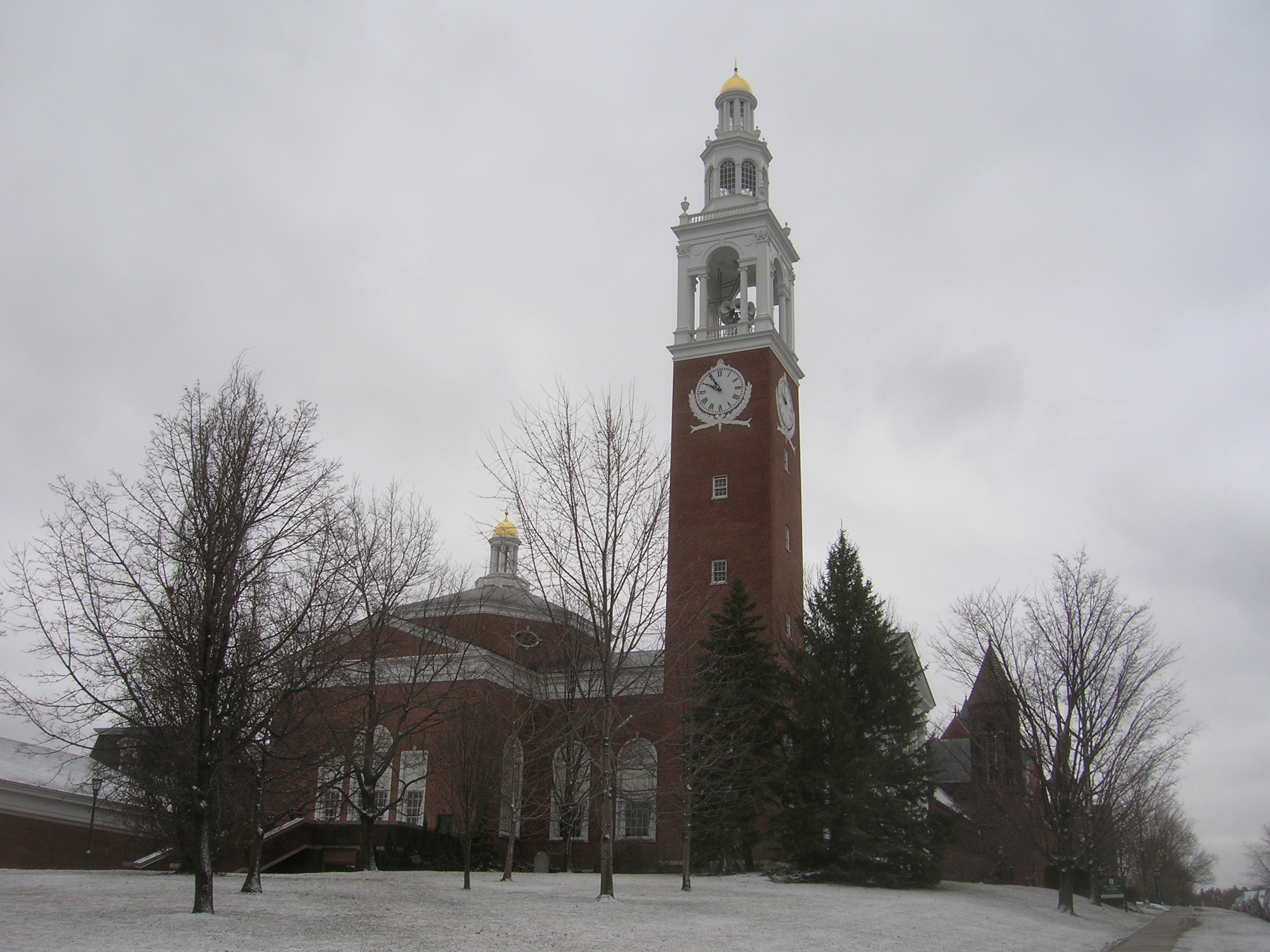
Northern view of Ira Allen Chapel: circa 2010

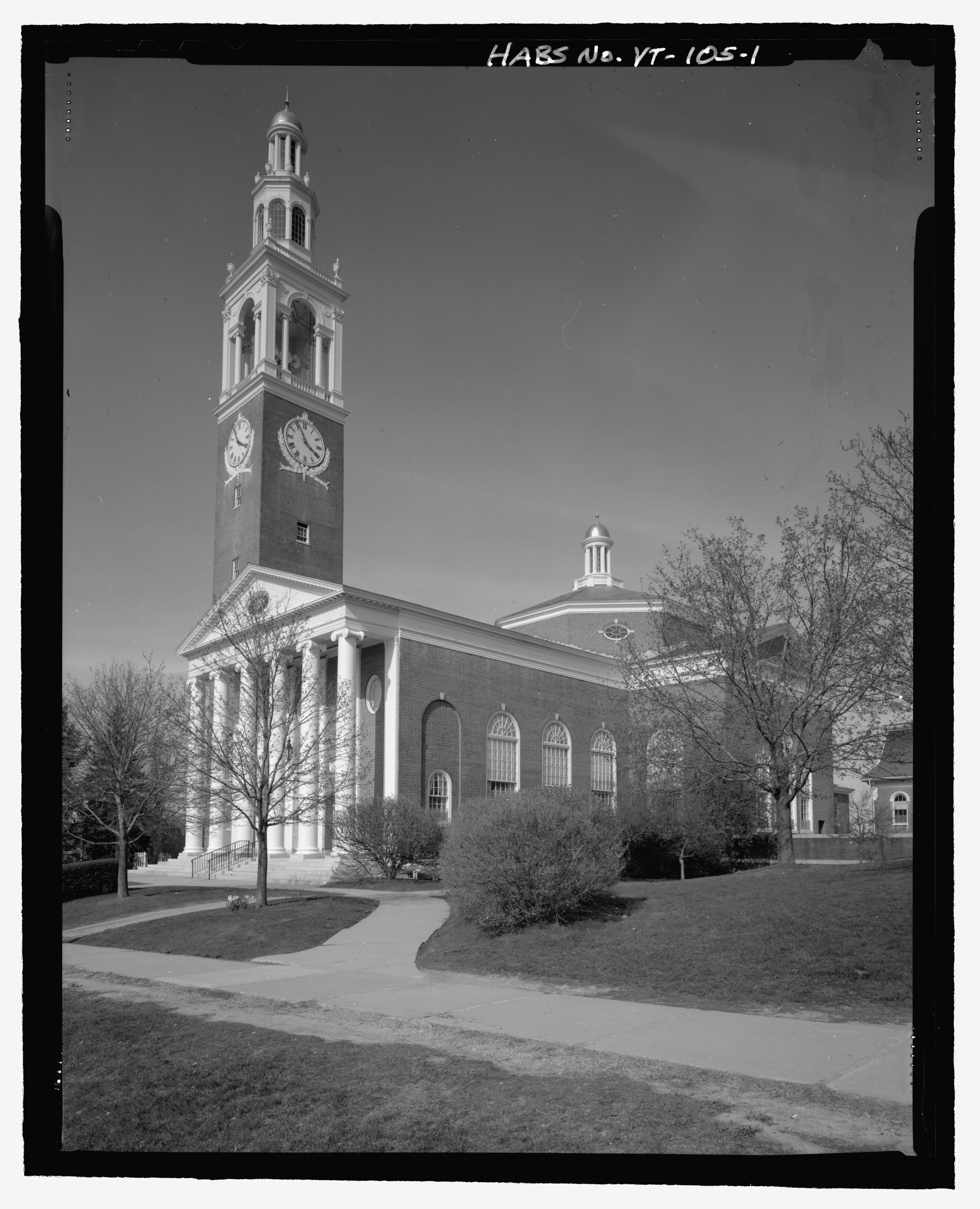
Ira Allen Chapel (B&W): 2006

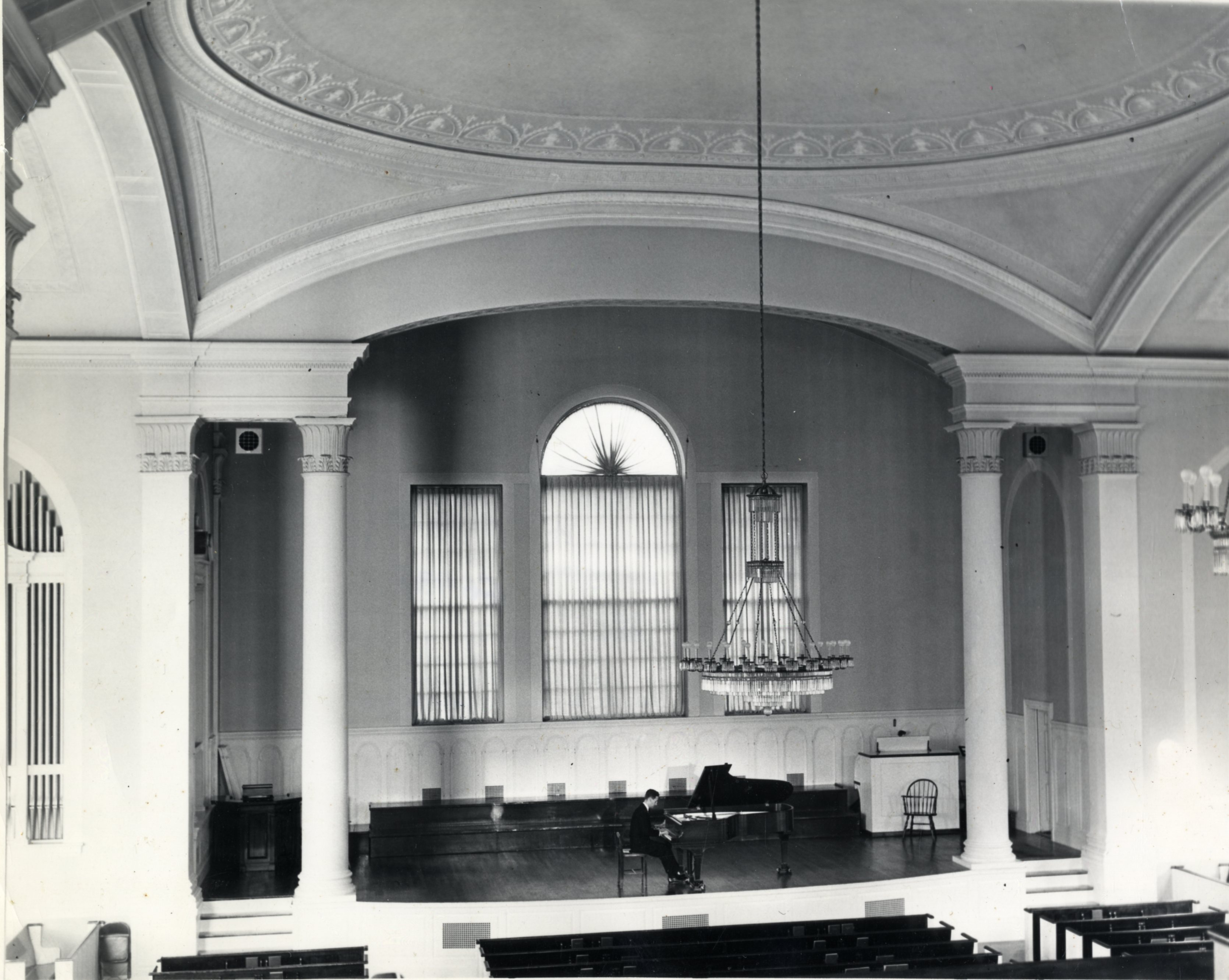
Vintage interior view of the Ira Allen Chapel (undated)

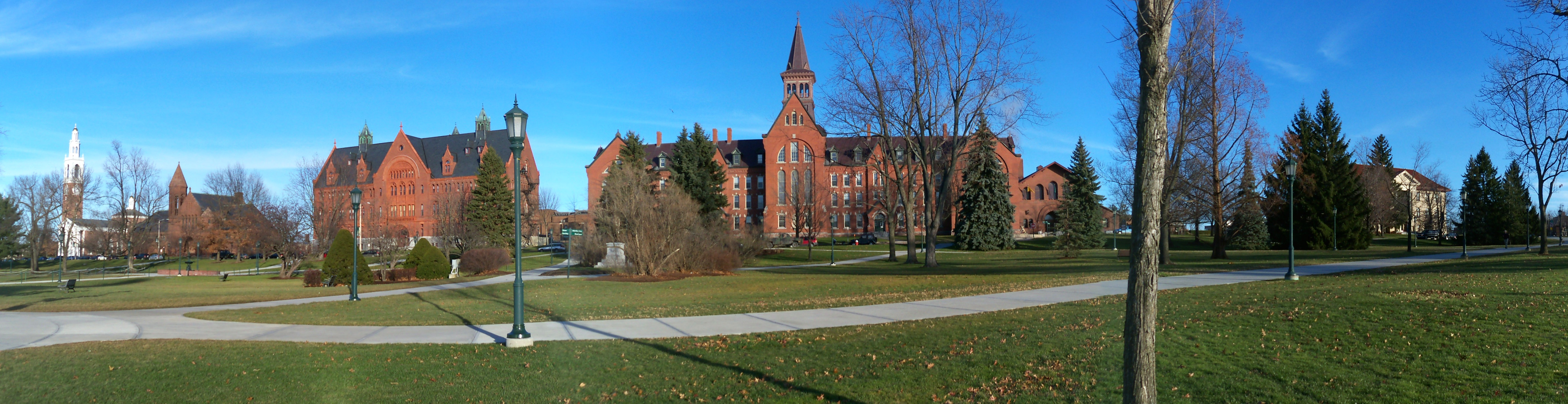
Panorama taken of the UVM Green (from the west). Ira Allen Chapel is located on the far left of the image: Dec 2012

== See also ==
- List of tallest buildings by U.S. state
- List of tallest buildings in Vermont
- List of carillons in Vermont
