= Voice of Nigeria =

International broadcasting station of Nigeria

- Type: Radio network
- Country: Nigeria
- Availability: International
- Owner: Federal Government of Nigeria
- Key people: Mr. Jibrin Baba Ndace (Director General), previous: Mr. Osita Okechukwu (2016–2023), Sampson Ogbonda Worlu (2015–2016), Abubakar Jijiwa (2005–2015), Taiwo Allimi (1999–2004), Yaya Abubakar (1990–1999)
- Launch date: 1961
- Official website: http://www.von.gov.ng

The Voice of Nigeria or VON (Yoruba: Ilé Akéde Nàíjíríà; Hausa: Muryar Najeriya; Igbo: Olu nke Naijiria; Fula: Konngol Naajeeriya) is the official international broadcasting station of Nigeria.

== History ==
Founded in 1961, the Voice of Nigeria began as the External Service of the then Nigerian Broadcasting Corporation (now Federal Radio Corporation of Nigeria). Then-Prime Minister Sir Abubakar Tafawa Balewa commissioned the service.

The service provides an external channel through which authoritative information about the African situation can be disseminated. Initially, its transmission used a 10 kW HF transmitter, limiting it to West Africa, broadcasting for two hours daily in English and French. Broadcast hours increased to six in 1963 with the commissioning of five prototype RCA 100 kW transmitters.

In 1989, five Brown Boveri transmitters with an antenna system were acquired. On January 5, 1990, VON became autonomous, and in 1996, three state-of-the-art 250 kW Thomcast AG transmitters were commissioned. This boosted VON's transmission to global audiences. The transmitting station is located on 40 hectares at Ipakodo, Ikorodu in Lagos State. While the administrative headquarters is in Abuja, the Federal Capital, News and Programmes emanate from both the Lagos and Abuja studios. In 2012, VON commissioned another state of the art multi-billion naira transmitting station at Lugbe, Abuja. Voice of Nigeria now operates on digital platforms with www.von.gov.ng as its official website. Broadcast operations are offered in eight languages, namely English, French, Kiswahili, Igbo, Yoruba, Hausa, Arabic and Fula with an app presence on app stores and Radio Garden/Simple Radio.

== Powers and functions ==
According to the Act establishing Voice of Nigeria (VON), it executes the following powers and functions:

- Exclusively broadcast externally, by radio, Nigeria's viewpoint to any part of the world.
- Provide radio broadcasting services as a public service in the interest of Nigeria
- Ensure that its services reflect views of Nigeria as a Federation and give adequate expression to the culture, characteristics, affairs and opinions of Nigeria.
- Ensure that news and programmes enhance Nigeria's foreign policy and image.

== Directors General ==
Jibrin Baba Ndace is the Director-General, appointed by President Bola Ahmed Tinubu.

=== Former ===
- Osita Okechukwu (2016–2023)
- Sampson Ogbonda Worlu (2015–2016)
- Abubakar Jijiwa (2005–2015)
- Taiwo Allimi (1999–2004)
- Yaya Abubakar (1990–1999)

== See also ==
- Federal Radio Corporation of Nigeria, the Nigerian publicly funded radio broadcaster
