= University Green Historic District =

Historic district in Vermont, United States

- U.S. National Register of Historic Places
- U.S. Historic district
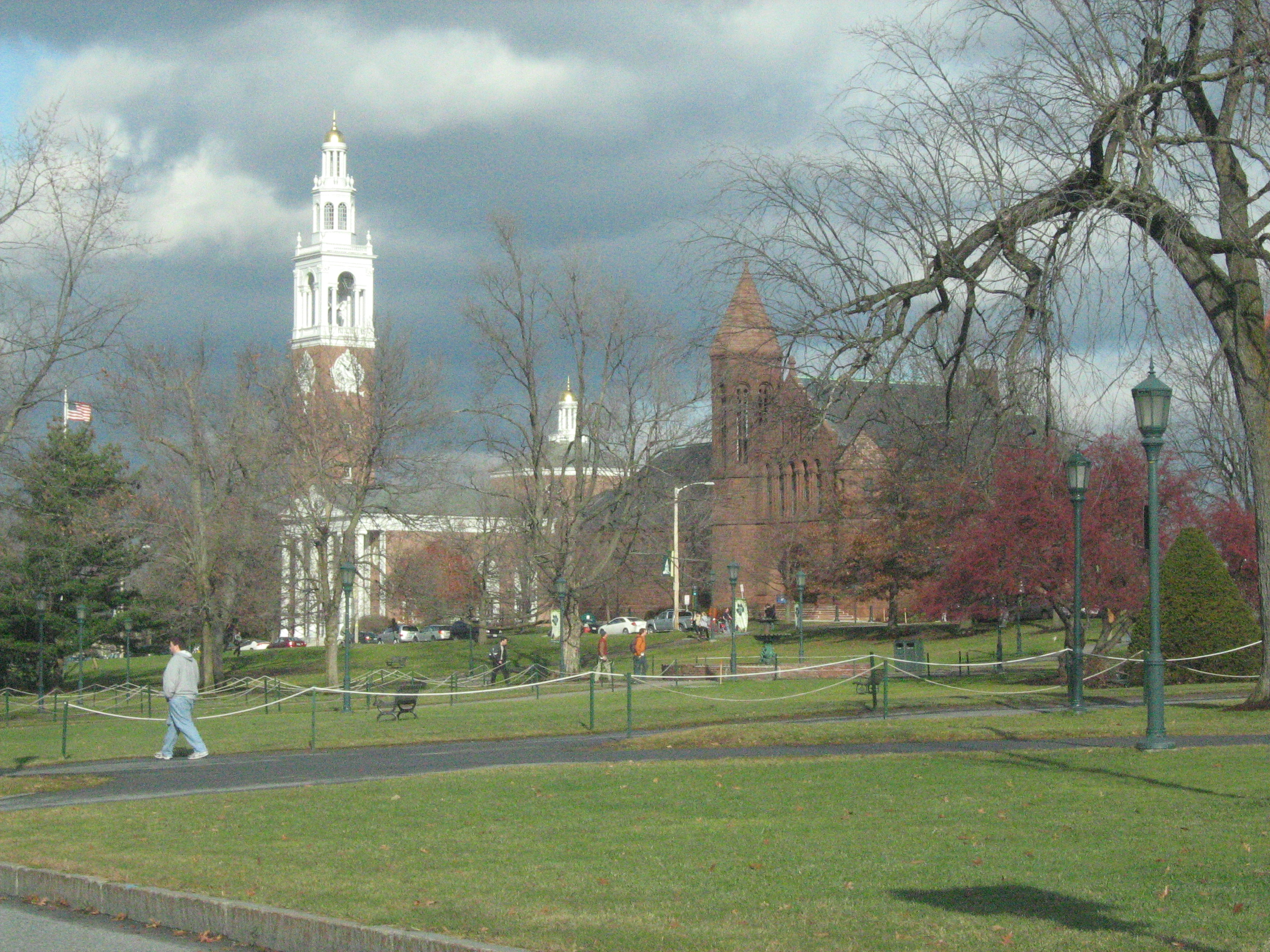
- View of the green

- Location within Vermont Location within the United States
- Location: University of Vermont campus, Burlington, Vermont
- Coordinates: 44°28′39″N 73°12′2″W
- Area: 58 acres (23 ha)
- Architectural style: Colonial Revival, Greek Revival, Richardsonian Romanesque
- NRHP reference No.: 75000139
- Added to NRHP: April 14, 1975

The University Green Historic District encompasses the central green and surrounding buildings of the main campus of the University of Vermont (UVM) in Burlington, Vermont. Established in 1801, the green has served as a central element of the campus since then. It is flanked by some of the university's oldest and most architecturally important buildings, and was listed on the National Register of Historic Places in 1975.

== Description and history ==
The University Green at UVM is a long and roughly rectangular park, bounded on the north by Colchester Street, the south by Main Street, the east by University Place, and the west by South Prospect Street. It is roughly three blocks long in the north-south direction, and its terrain slopes, rising to east. It is criss-crossed by paved walkways, and has a fountain at the center, from which some of the walkways radiate. Trees, benches, and public artwork and memorials dot the landscape.

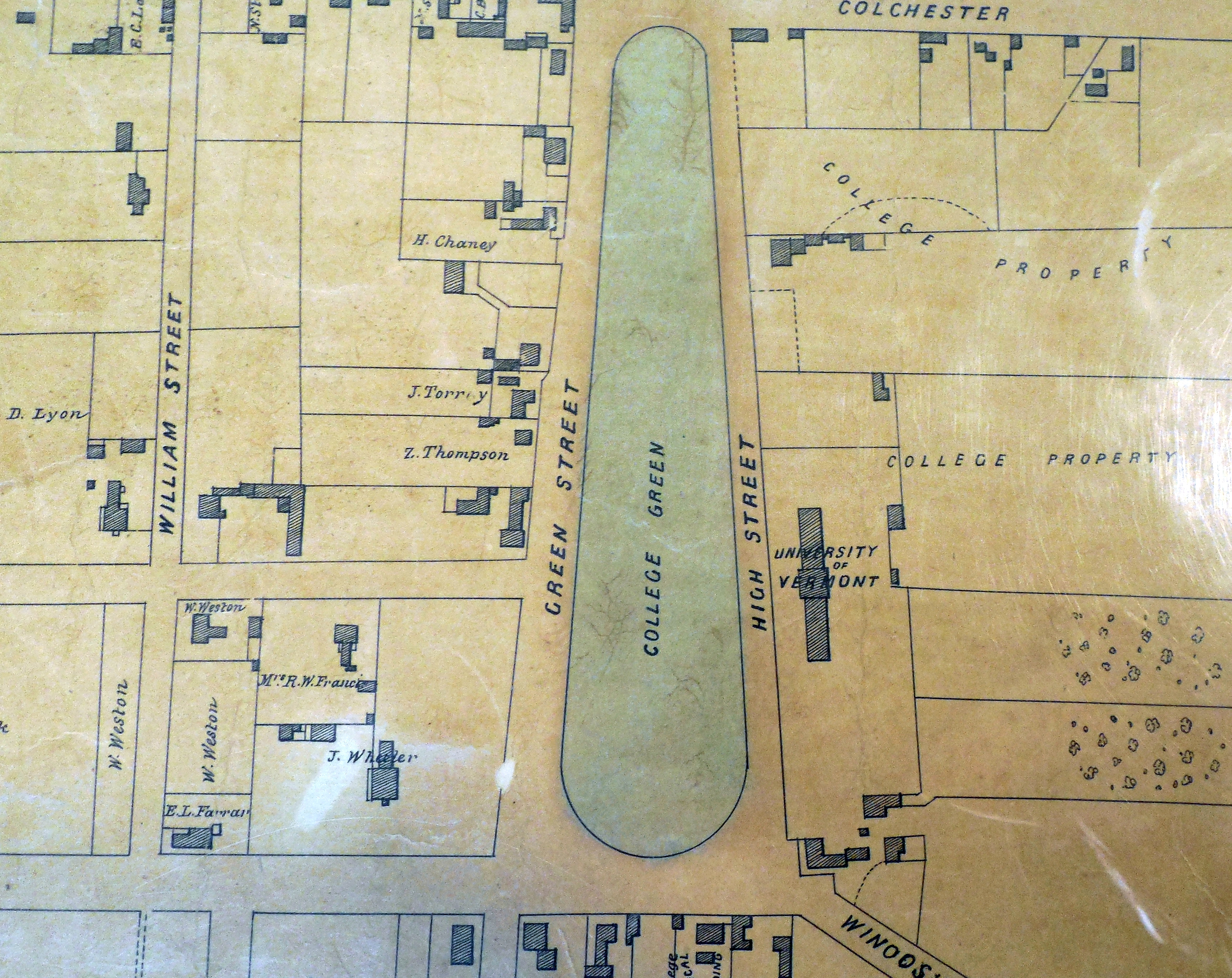
1853 map of the University Green (formerly known as "College Green"). Main College (right), labeled "University of Vermont" is today known as the "Old Mill" building

The architecture lining the green is divided roughly into three groups. On the east side of the green are some of the university's finest buildings, including the Ira Allen Chapel (1926, McKim, Mead & White), the Billings Memorial Library (1883, H.H. Richardson), Williams Hall (1884, Wilson Brothers), the Old Mill (1825), the university's oldest surviving building, and Morrill Hall (1907, C.W. Buckham). The short southern side of the green is lined by a series of four 19th-century houses, all now in university ownership and housing some of its facilities. The green's west side is dominated by Waterman Hall (1941, McKim, Meade & White), the university's main administration building, and a cluster of buildings at the northern end that are part of the University of Vermont Medical Center. The northern flank of the park is dominated by Grasse Mount, an architecturally eclectic mansion house built in 1803.

The land that makes up the green was part of a gift to the university made by Ira Allen, and was originally intended by Allen as an open space. This was reinforced in 1801, when Allen complained of plans by the university trustees to build on it; those plans were later altered, securing its status as a park. It has acted as such to both the university community and the larger Burlington populace for over two centuries.

== Contributing properties ==
- Ira Allen Chapel
- Morrill Hall (University of Vermont)
- Old Mill
- Sigma Phi Place

== See also ==
- National Register of Historic Places listings in Chittenden County, Vermont
