= Taiwo Allimi =

Nigerian journalist and media executive

Taiwo Olubowale Allimi (born December 17, 1944, in Sagamu, Nigeria) is a Nigerian journalist and media executive. He was director-general of Voice of Nigeria from 1999 to 2004. He was chair of the Broadcasting Organizations of Nigeria (BON) from 1999-2004. He was the state commissioner of information, social welfare, youth, sports and culture in Ogun state from 1986-1991.
