= Ibeji =

Twin Orishas in the Yoruba religion

- Twins, Duality, Joy, Mischief, Abundance, Children
- Member of Orisha
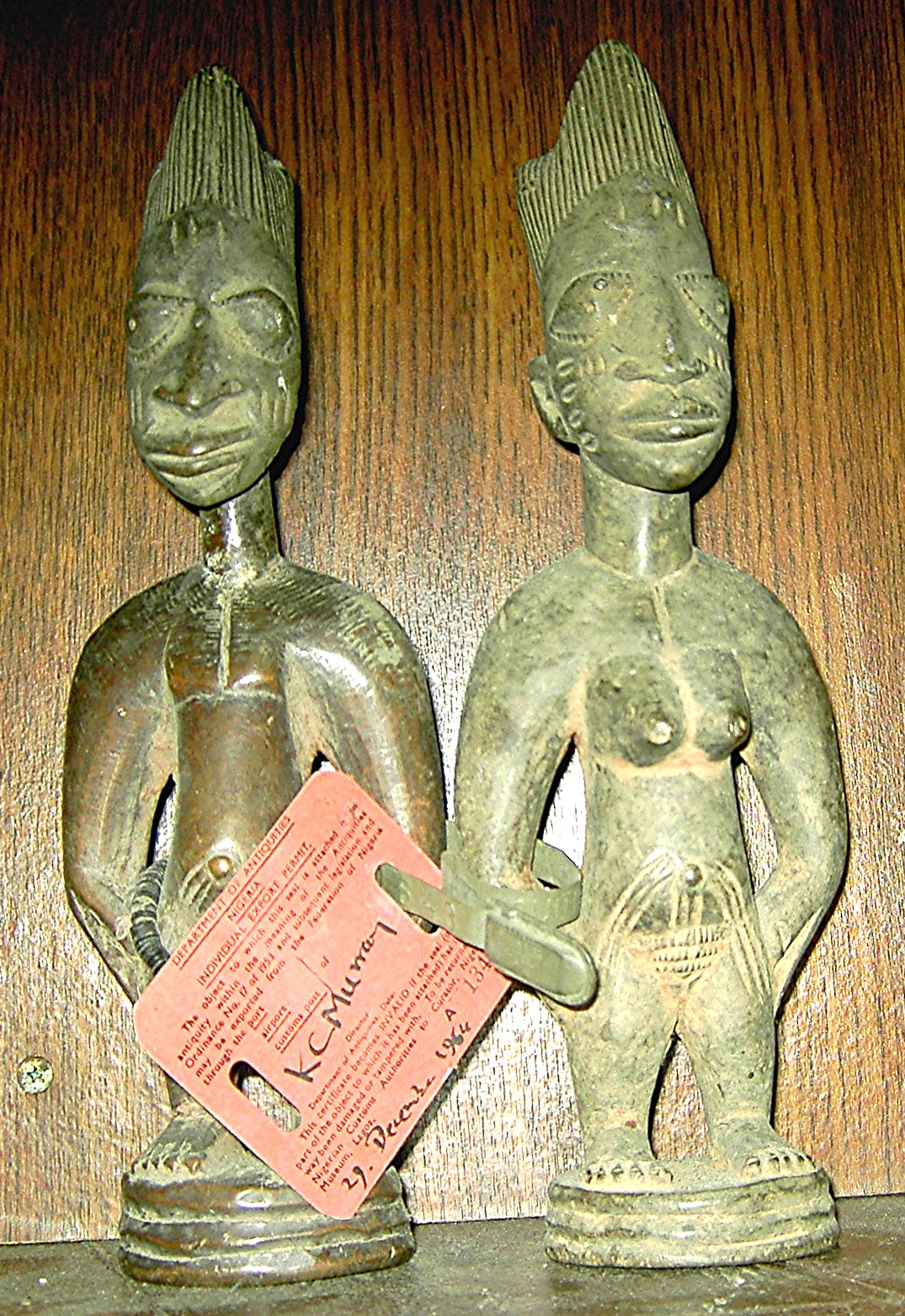
- Pair of Ibeji, authenticated by the Department of Antiquities of Nigeria
- Other names: Ibeji or Ibeyi; Jimaguas
- Venerated in: Yoruba religion, Umbanda, Candomble, Santeria, Haitian Vodou, Folk Catholicism
- Symbol: Twins
- Region: Nigeria, Benin, Latin America
- Ethnic group: Yoruba

Ibeji (known as Ibejí, Ibeyí, or Jimaguas in Latin America) is the name of a pair of Orisha representing divine twins in the Yoruba religion of the Yoruba people (originating from Yorubaland, an area in and around present-day Nigeria). In the diasporic Yoruba spirituality of Latin America, Ibeji are syncretized with Saints Cosmas and Damian. In Yoruba culture and spirituality, twins are believed to be sacred, and are granted protection by the Orisha Shango. If one twin should die, it represents bad fortune for the parents and the society to which they belong. The parents therefore commission a babalawo to carve a wooden Ibeji to represent the deceased twin, and the parents take care of the figure as if it were a real person. Other than the sex, the appearance of the Ibeji figure is determined by the sculptor. The parents then dress and decorate the it to represent their own status, using clothing made from cowrie shells, as well as beads, coins, and paint.

Ibeji figures are admired by tribal art collectors and many have made their way into western collections. The world's largest collection of Ibejis is at The British Museum, London.

The firstborn of the twins is known as Taiwo while the second one is called Kehinde. In Yoruba culture the second twin is considered the elder twin; the reason for this is that Taiwo is sent by Kehinde to judge if the world is fit and beautiful before he/she descends, in accordance with Yoruba belief.

== See also ==
- Taiwo
- Kehinde
