= Hassanat Akinwande =

Nigerian film and television actress

Wunmi
- Born: Hassanat Taiwo Akinwande
- Occupation: Actress

Hassanat Taiwo Akinwande, the stage name Wunmi, is a well-known Nigerian film and television actress. She is of Yoruba ethnicity.

Her career began in the 1980s with appearances in the soap opera Feyi Kogbon. She has had leading roles in over 50 videos.

In 2006 she was arrested for possession of cocaine. The publicity surrounding her arrest boosted the popularity of her videos.!
