= Johnson House (University of Vermont) =

University of Vermont campus building

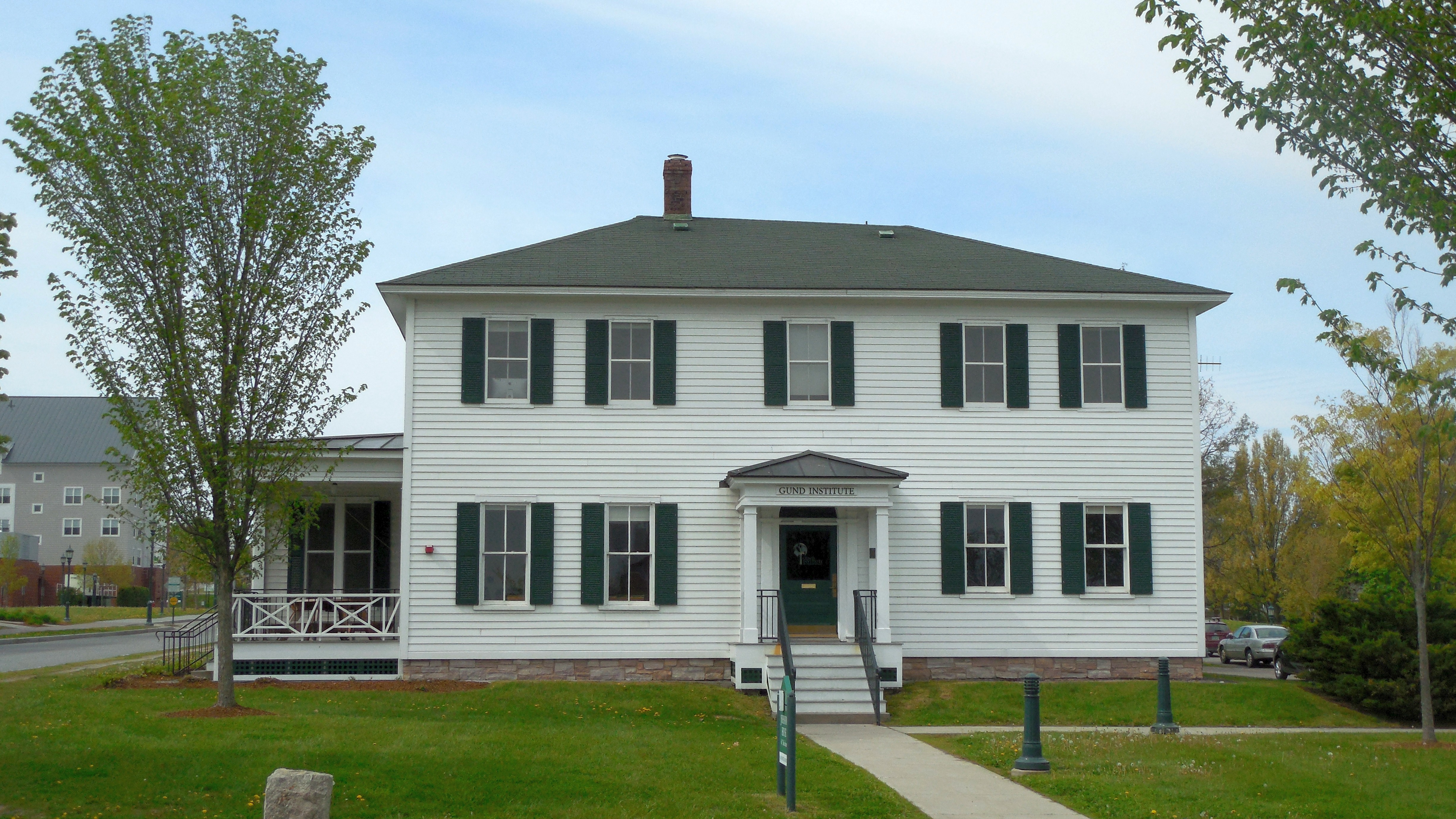
- The "Johnson House" at the University of Vermont
- Interactive map of the Johnson House area

General information
- Type: Campus Building
- Location: Burlington, Vermont
- Coordinates: 44°28′28.34″N 73°11′43.95″W
- Completed: 1806 (built); 1906 (moved to 590 Main Street); 2005 (moved to 617 Main Street)

Design and construction
- Architect: John Johnson

Johnson House is a campus building of the University of Vermont (UVM), which is located at 617 Main Street, on the southwestern corner of the intersection of University Heights in Burlington, Vermont.

It was built in 1806 as part of a 22-acre farm by Moses Catlin on the parcel where Morrill Hall currently stands. Due to the forthcoming construction of Morrill Hall, the house was moved in 1906 to 590 Main Street (the present location of the Dudley Davis Center). The house was again moved on 9 July 2005 across the street to its current location at 617 Main Street, on the southwest side of the intersection of University Heights.

Catlin sold the house and property to John Johnson (Vermont's third surveyor-general) in 1809. Johnson was an accomplished architect and engineer who designed and oversaw the construction of the original college building (the 1802 predecessor to the present day "Old Mill" building), its replacement (after it had burned down in 1824), as well as Grasse Mount in 1804, and Pomeroy Hall in 1828.

The John Johnson House has housed the Gund Institute for Ecological Economics since 2002.
