= WRUV =

Radio station at the University of Vermont

- Burlington, Vermont; United States
- Broadcast area: Greater Burlington, Vermont
- Frequency: 90.1 MHz

Programming
- Format: Eclectic

Ownership
- Owner: University of Vermont

History
- First air date: October 3, 1965 (on FM)
- Call sign meaning: "Radio University of Vermont"

Technical information
- Licensing authority: FCC
- Facility ID: 66566
- Class: A
- ERP: 460 watts
- HAAT: 40 meters (130 ft)
- Transmitter coordinates: 44°28′49″N 73°12′05″W

Links
- Public license information: Public file; LMS
- Webcast: Listen live
- Website: wruv.org

WRUV (90.1 FM) is a free format radio station. Licensed to Burlington, Vermont, United States, the station is owned by The University of Vermont.

== History ==
WRUV is the radio voice of the University of Vermont. It is a non-profit, non-commercial, educational entity licensed by the FCC comprising UVM students, staff and community members. Most of the station's funding is provided by UVM's Student Government Association while fundraisers and community underwriting covers the rest.

WRUV made its official broadcast debut from its studios in the Pomeroy barn in January 1955. The program was carried via a closed circuit system to the men's dormitories, Grasse Mount, Converse Hall, and the Redstone Campus. In 1956, the club started AM broadcasting of music.

Simulcast AM/FM broadcasting began in October 1965, with the station moving to FM-only in the early 1970s. By the mid 1970s, the station removed simulcast AM/FM from their repertoire and became a strictly FM broadcaster.

In 1986, WRUV crossed Main Street and moved into the basement of the Billings Student Center, quickly plastering the studio walls with thousands of pictures of different artists and musical groups. It began Internet broadcasting in 1997. In the summer of 2007, the station moved into the brand new Dudley H. Davis Center, the nation's first LEED Certified student center. The station's 460 watt transmitter allows the station to be heard as far away as Canada and upstate New York.

== Programming ==
The station's philosophy towards broadcasting is to "provide a mixture of different styles of music and an alternative to the watered-down offerings of corporate-commercial radio". From soul, indie, jazz, house, hip-hop, classical, reggae, Latin, to eclectic, the music choice is left to the disc jockey. Each DJ is assigned a weekly slot of one to three hours and allowed to program their own style of show (free format). The only restrictions are that no more than 20% of a DJ's playlist can be by artists who have charted in the Billboard Hot 100, and that no song that has charted in the Billboard Hot 100 can be played.

There are a few programs with news on WRUV as well, including WRUV's news show InTheKnow (UVM and Burlington news) and Moccasin Tracks (Native American affairs).

The Exposure segment is hosted the 2nd and 4th Wednesday of every month. It features local bands and gives them the opportunity to "play a live set, chat about upcoming shows, and whatever else we feel like."

== Executive board ==
All UVM students who are members of the SGA-sanctioned student club of WRUV are eligible to run for the executive board positions. There are two non-student positions as well, making all WRUV community members applicable.

Elections are held annually at the end of the Spring Semester for the following year and the entire WRUV collective takes part in the election process. Preference is given to individuals who expect to remain in the area during the following year as much as possible. Previous Executive Board Members may run for more than one term of duty.
