= Morrill Hall (University of Vermont) =

Campus building in Burlington, Vermont, US

- U.S. Historic district – Contributing property
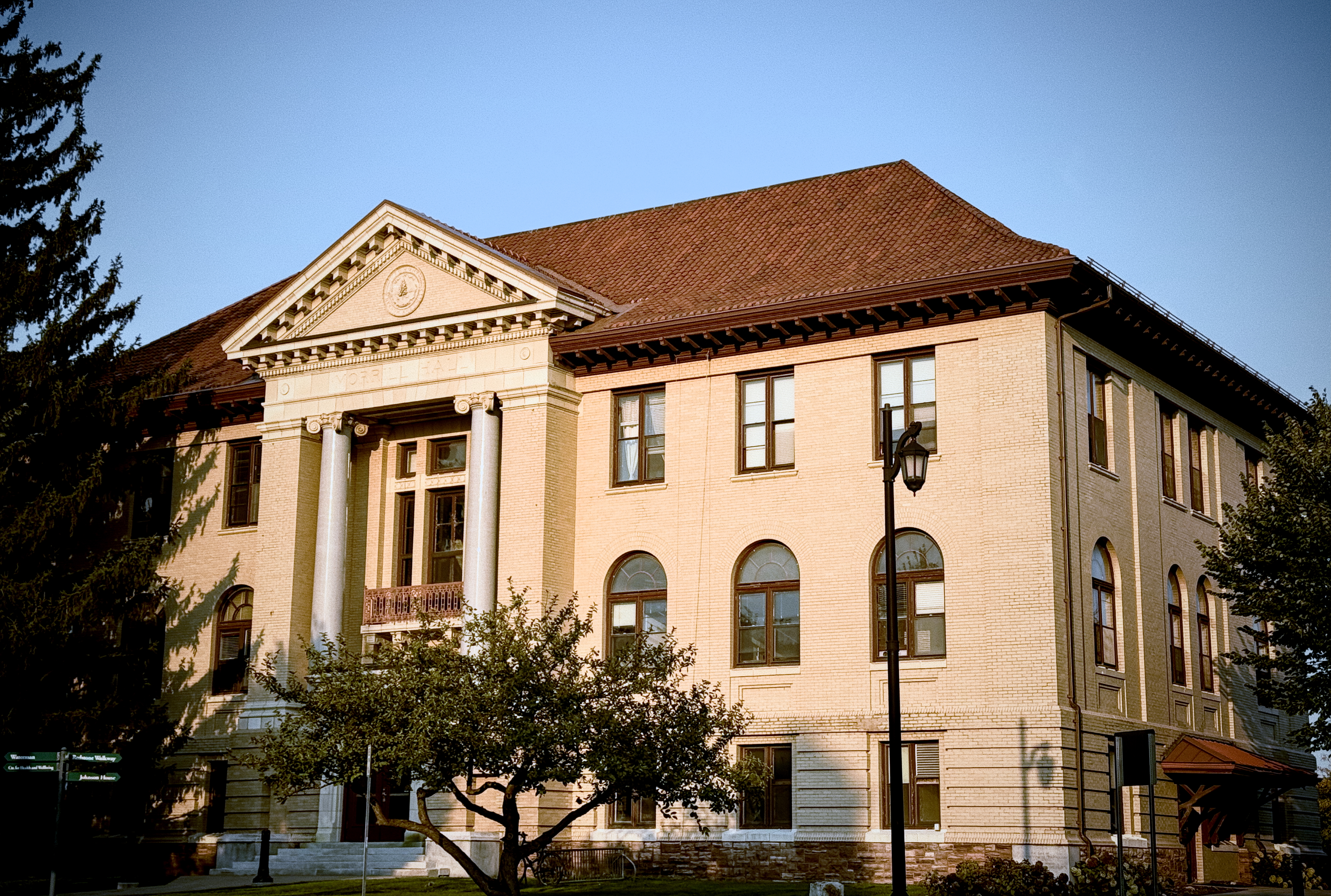

- Location within Vermont Location within the United States
- Location: Burlington, Vermont
- Coordinates: 44°28′35″N 73°11′54″W
- Built: 1906–07
- Architect: Charles W. Buckham
- Architectural style: Neoclassical Revival
- Part of: University Green Historic District (ID75000139)
- Added to NRHP: April 14, 1975

Morrill Hall is a campus building of the University of Vermont (UVM), which is located on the southeast corner of the "University Green" in Burlington, Vermont (on the corner of Main Street and University Place).

The building was named after U.S. Senator, Justin Smith Morrill who authored the Morrill Land-Grant Acts of 1862 and 1890, which created the American Land-Grant universities and colleges. Senator Morrill also served as a trustee of the university from 1865 until 1898. The building was constructed during 1906–07 to serve as the home of the UVM Agriculture Department and the Agricultural Experiment Station.

It was added to National Register of Historic Places as part of University Green Historic District on April 14, 1975. As of 2015, the building continues to house the College of Agriculture and Life Sciences and the UVM Agricultural Extension Service.

== History ==
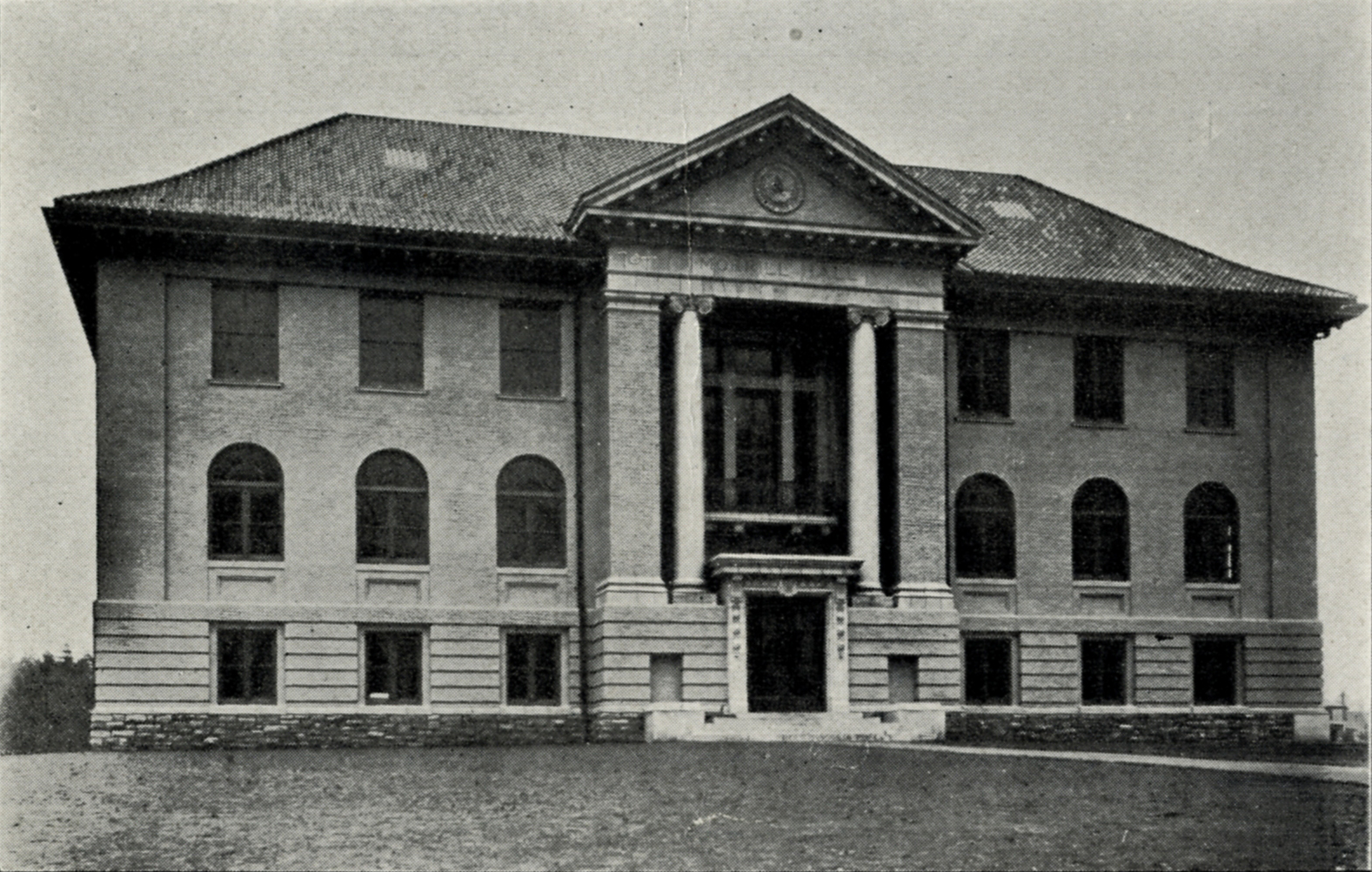
University of Vermont, Morrill Hall, circa 1907

Morrill Hall was constructed with a State appropriation of $60,000, which passed in the Vermont House under bill H.76 on October 27, 1904 (with a vote of 170 Yeas and 54 Nays), in the Senate on November 11, 1904 (with a vote of 23 Yeas and 2 Nays), and was signed by the Governor on November 15, 1904. Morrill Hall was dedicated on December 11, 1907. It was the first building ever to be constructed on the UVM campus using state funds.

=== Land use history ===
The site where Morrill Hall currently stands was part of a 22-acre farm originally owned by Moses Catlin. The land was passed to Catlin from Ira Allen in November 1798 as a result of a levy originating from a federal judgement against Allen. Catlin had filed a lawsuit on the behalf of his wife, Lucinda Catlin (née Allen) for mismanagement of her late father's estate. Lucinda Catlin was the daughter of Heman Allen (of Cornwall) and niece to Ira and Ethan Allen.

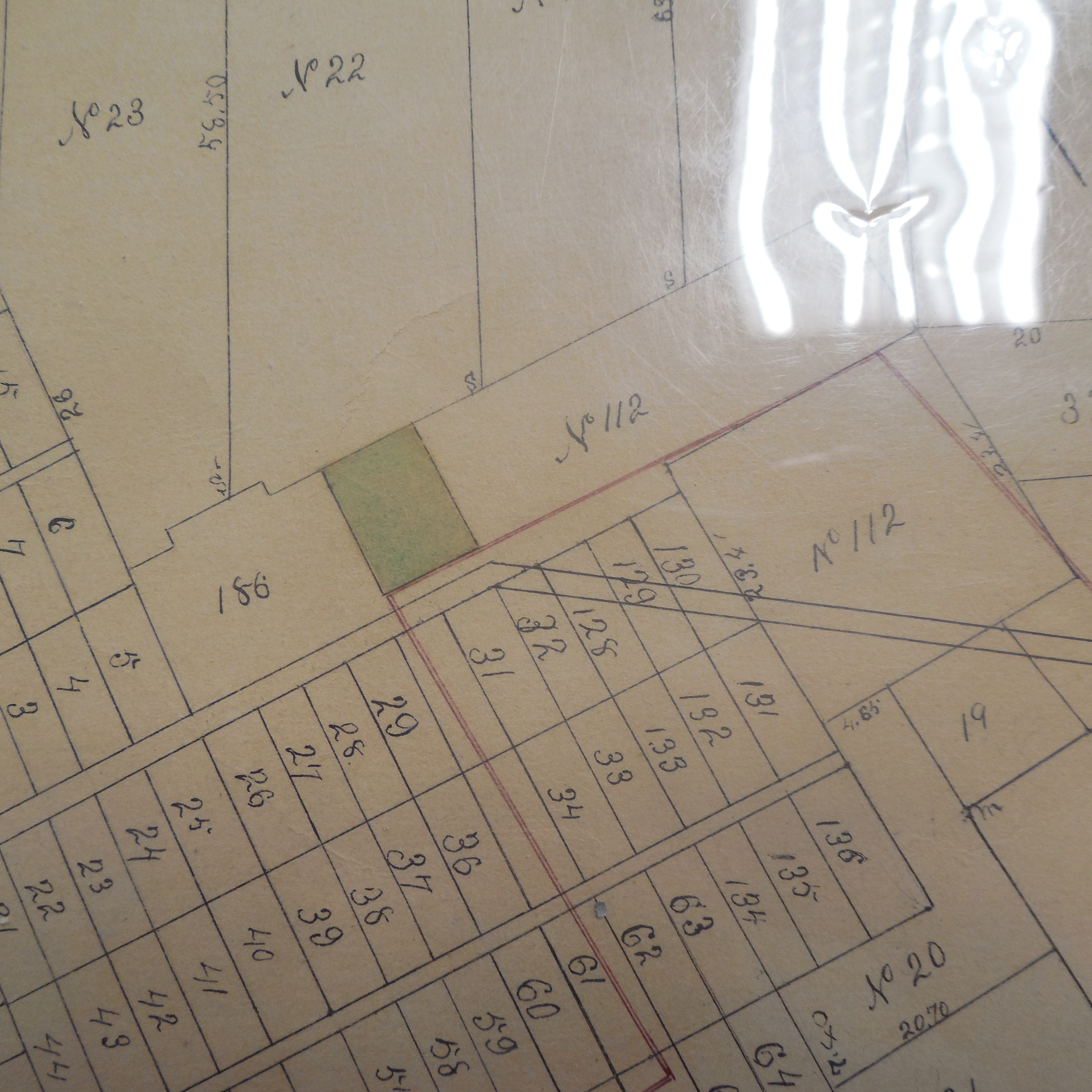
1798 map of lots owned by Ira Allen, which became the future site of Morrill Hall

In 1806, Catlin built the original house on the property, which is today known as the "Johnson House". The property was then sold to John Johnson (Vermont's third surveyor-general) in 1809. Johnson was in charge of surveying the northeastern boundary between Canada and the U.S. (circa 1816). He had also served as the architect and master builder of the original college building (i.e. the 1802 predecessor to the present day "Old Mill" building). After it was destroyed by fire in 1824, Johnson designed much of its replacement, as well as other buildings on the UVM campus (e.g. Grasse Mount in 1804, and Pomeroy Hall in 1828).

Johnson's son Edwin F. Johnson passed the property to his son-in-law Joseph Dana Allen, who then passed it to his son John Johnson Allen (UVM class of 1862). In 1906, the site known as the "Allen Homestead" was sold to the University Trustees by J.J. Allen (for a sum of $30,000 or $32,000) for the purpose of the building's construction.

=== Construction ===
To make way for the construction of Morrill Hall during 1906, the barn and a line fence on the property were demolished, while the original "Johnson House" was moved to 590 Main Street (i.e. the current location of the Dudley H. Davis Student Center). In 2005, the Johnson House was again moved to the opposite side of the street, on the southwestern corner of University Heights and Main Street.

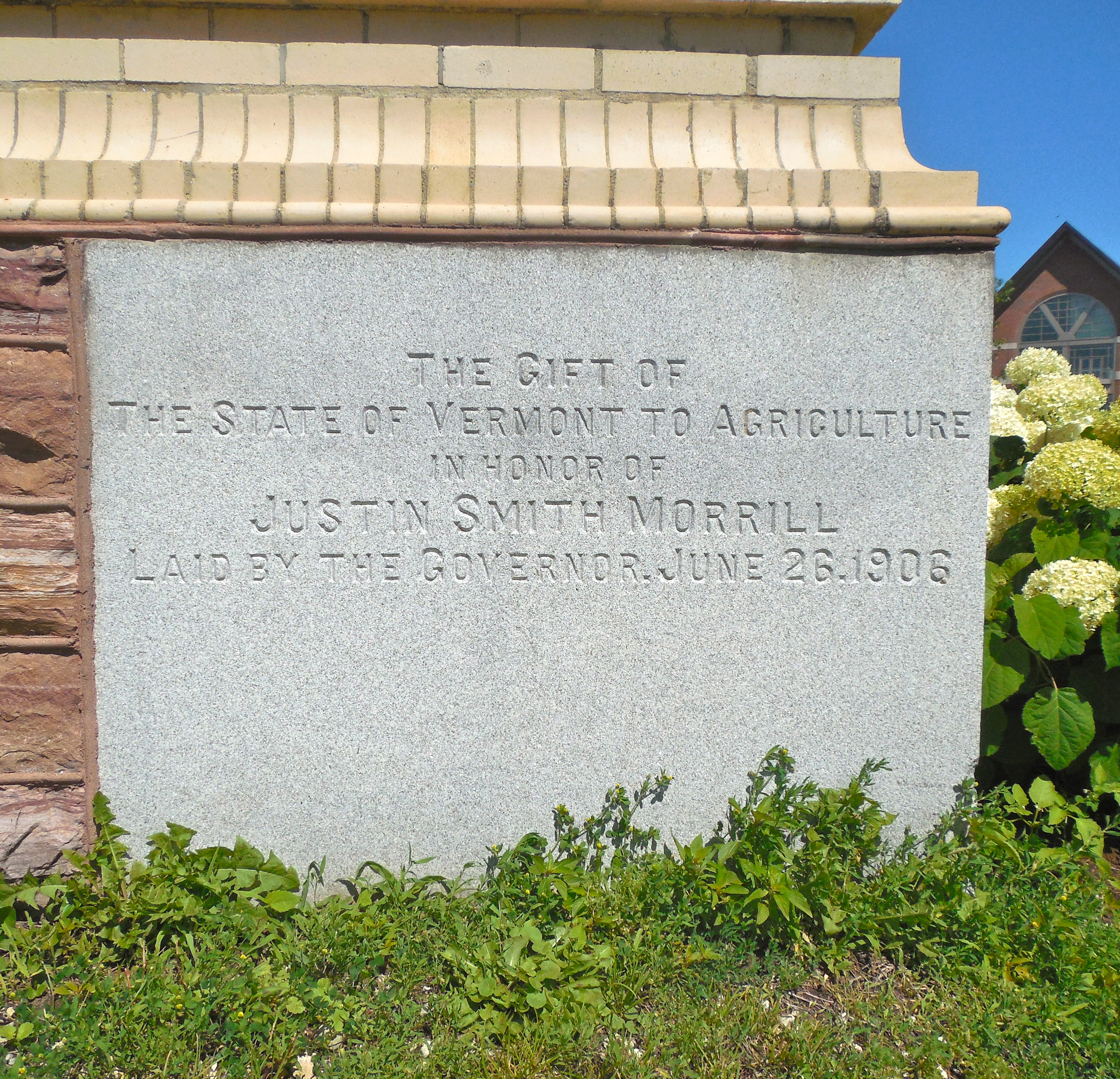
Corner stone of Morrill Hall, University of Vermont

The corner stone of the Morrill Hall was laid on June 26, 1906 as part of that year's commencement exercises. A copper box was placed inside the corner stone containing a number of historical documents causal to the building's construction (e.g. the Morrill Bills of 1862 and 1890, the Hatch Act of 1887, the Adams Act of 1906, State legislation addressing the State Agriculture College and Experiment Station, the 18th report of the Vermont Experiment station, et al.) by Gov. Charles J. Bell.

The Champlain Manufacturing Company of Burlington served as the construction contractor, with oversight by a member of the UVM Board of Trustees, G.S. Fassett. Senator Morrill's son contributed an additional $1,000 for the two granite pillars at the building's facade. The contractor was said to have lost about $10,000 on the project and the university spent untold thousands more to equip the building. During this time, the first floor facilities included; the offices of the Dean and Director, Professor of Horticulture, Stenographer, office and laboratory of the dairy husbandman, a library, classrooms, and the agricultural chemistry and horticultural laboratories. The upper floor facilities included; class and lecture rooms, the chemistry laboratories of the Experiment Station, and the Soil Physics laboratory. The basement operated as a dairy facility (including a creamery), served as storage for farm machinery, and housed a mail room, and the power and heating plant.

The majority of the original interior partitions were made of painted brick, where some of the other partitions were made of brown ash. The ceilings were constructed entirely out of steel. The building was equipped with an elaborate ventilation system for its time, and was heated using steam.

In 1911, three 60' x 20' green houses and a steam-powered head house (costing $7,000) were built in back of Morrill Hall, which provided for teaching and experimentation in horticulture and plant physiology, and replaced the outmoded 1891 greenhouse facility formerly located on the university's farm.

=== Historic occupancy ===
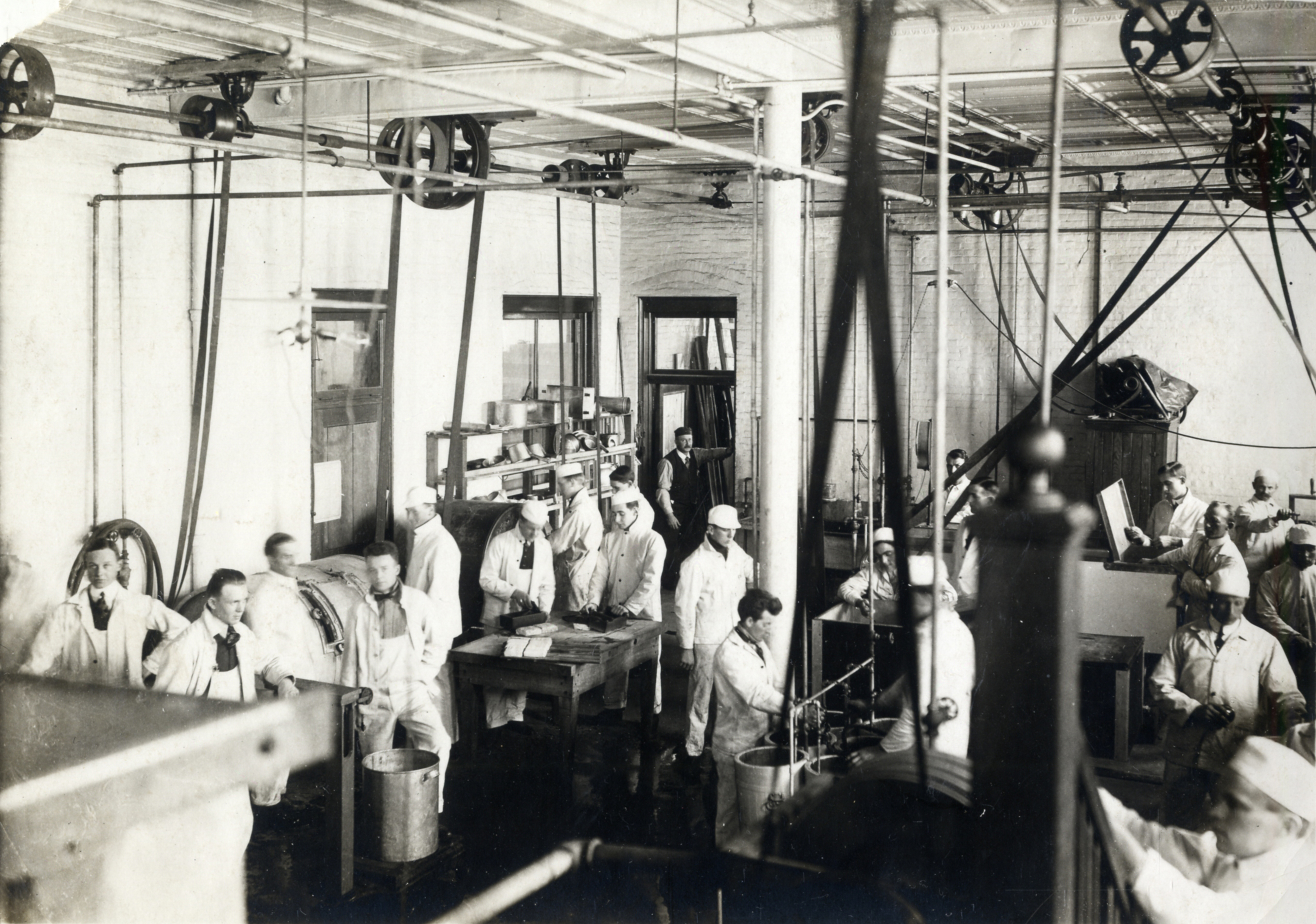
Dairy operation in Morrill Hall basement, early 1900s

When Morrill Hall had first opened in 1907, it housed the Departments of Agriculture, Horticulture, Forestry, and the University Extension Service, which administered a total of 60 students and 10 faculty. Within a decade the facility was already considered to be overcrowded. The number of faculty, staff and students in 1916 was reported to have increased to 125 regular students (with an additional 50 students during the winter months), and 32 faculty and staff utilizing the offices and laboratories.

"The congestion is such that neither service nor work can be satisfactorily accomplished. Teachers, research men, extension workers, stenographers, students, soldiers, visitors tread on each other's heels."

— University of Vermont Report of the College of Agriculture, Vermont Public Documents Being Reports of State Officers, Department and Institutions for the Two Years Ending June 30, 1918

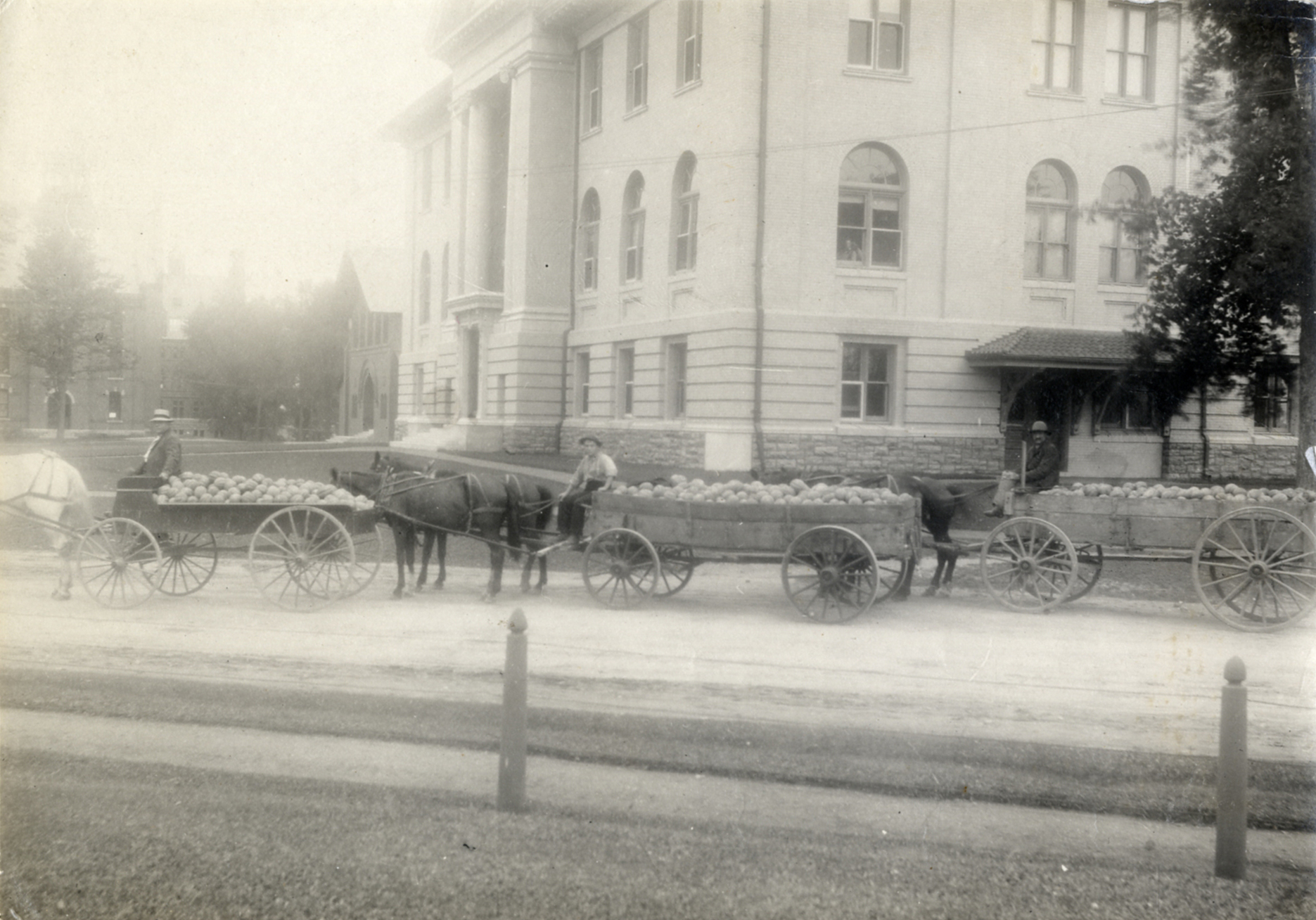
UVM Extension Service "Bumper Crops" passing by Morrill Hall, 1908

By 1925, the attendance of the College of Agriculture had "considerably more than tripled" since 1907. During that year, after the passing of the Purnell Act (which had significantly increased federal endowments for all 48 of the nation's agricultural experiment stations), the building's overcrowded conditions began to be addressed when the university moved the offices and research laboratories of the dairy department into the renovated "old medical college building" (known today as Pomeroy Hall) located diagonally across the street from Morrill Hall.

In 1932, the Agricultural Extension Service offices were moved to the former residence of a UVM Professor, Josiah W. Votey at 481 Main Street.

In 1946, the basement was installed with a foods laboratory, and a new milk laboratory replaced the storage area and mail room (that was relocated to 481 Main Street). However, by the mid to late 1940s, the Home Economics department "had taken over much of the building", until the Bertha M. Terrill Home Economics Building (i.e. Terrill Hall) was constructed in 1950–51.

=== Professor Bertha M. Terrill and the Home Economics department ===
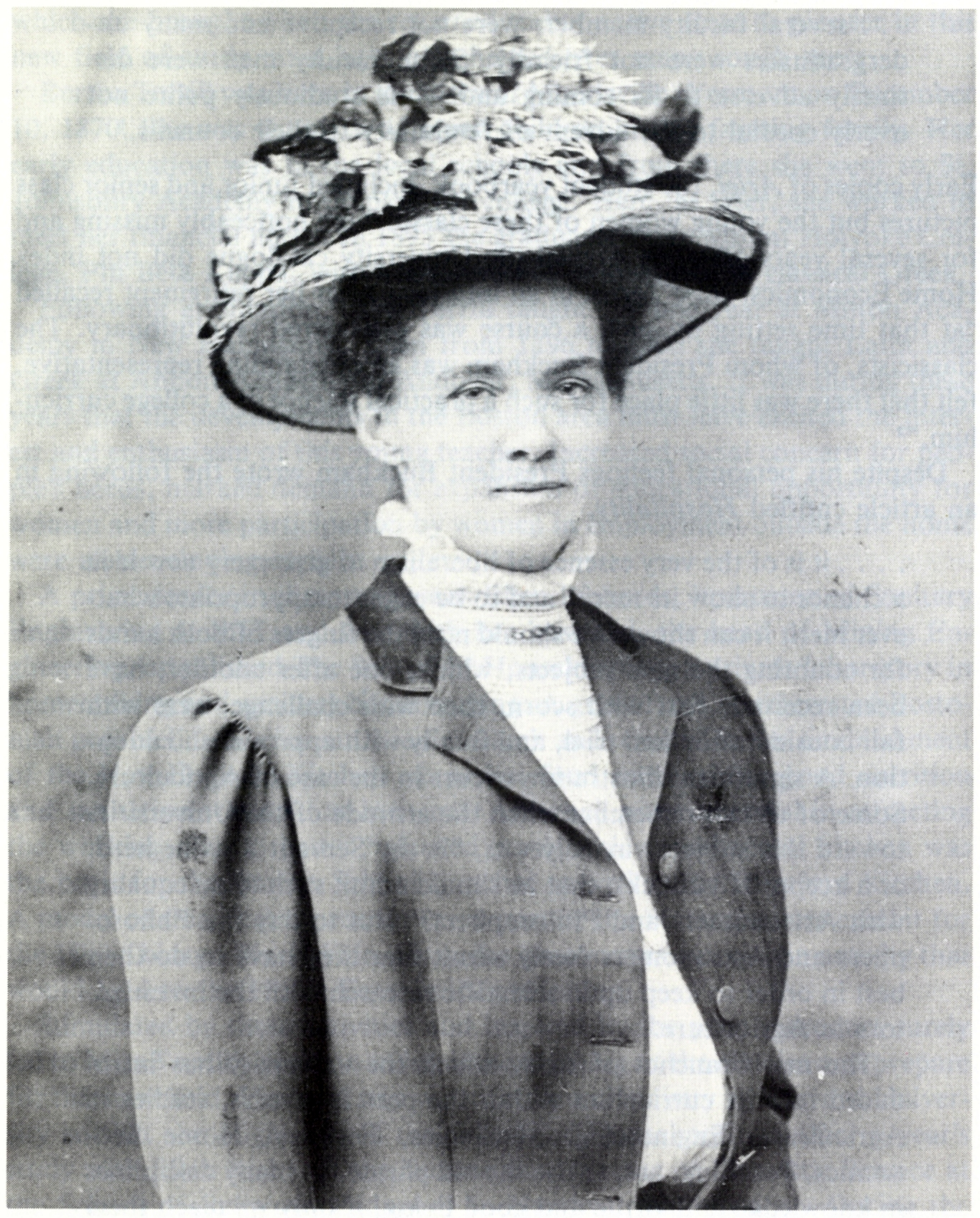
Professor Bertha Terrill in 1909

A testament to her efficacy in establishing the Department of Home Economics (more recently known as the Department of Leadership and Developmental Sciences) over the course of her 31-year tenure, Bertha Mary Terrill (1870–1968) initiated the program during the fall semester of 1909 as the sole instructor with only a single classroom located in the basement of Morrill Hall. With a $1,000 contribution raised by university alumnae, Terrill converted the former storage room into her classroom and laboratory, shoveling out the plaster herself. The first woman to join the faculty in the university's history during that year, Terrill was soon appointed as the Dean of Women. In 1911, an additional instructor and a furnished room within Morrill Hall was added to the department. Terrill's introduction of "practical education" for women within her curriculum (e.g. Chemistry, Physiology, Bacteriology, which were prerequisites for most of her courses) was considered to be highly controversial among higher-education institutions of the day. Later reflecting that she may not have had the courage to come to Vermont had she known beforehand how much prejudice against women she would encounter, Terrill nevertheless had a successful academic career, which included; the authorship of a book, serving as a charter member of the American Home Economics Association, and the co-founding of the Burlington Community Center (today known as the Sara M. Holbrook Community Center) in Burlington, Vermont in November 1937. Taking an interest in a number of humanitarian efforts, Professor Terrill had introduced educational programs to people in rural areas of the State to improve nutrition, consumer practices, and sanitation. While undertaking this work, she had urged many farm girls to enroll in the university. A notable colleague (and former student), Mary Jean Simpson (1888-1977) had once remarked; "No one ever knew how many girls Bertha helped finance out of her own pocket."

Having expanded the department to six full-time professors and three research professors, Professor Terrill was awarded and honorary Doctorate of Science in Home Economics upon her retirement in 1940.

=== Modern renovations and occupancy ===
In 1967, the university considered a $540,000 proposal to renovate the building. Some of the improvements considered were; removal of the large main "decorative" stairway and replacing it with two smaller fireproof stairways; converting the attic into a laboratory; and installing a mechanical ventilation system, low-hung ceilings, an elevator, and a handicap-accessible ramp at the front door. Although the proposal was not accepted, an elevator was eventually installed providing access to all four levels of the building.

Around 1992–93 (possibly sooner), the Vermont Center for Geographic Information (VCGI), an "Affiliate Organization" of UVM at the time, was located on the upper floor of Morrill Hall. In 1999, their offices were relocated to the first floor of the Johnson House.

== Current use and occupancy ==
Today the building houses the College of Agriculture and Life Sciences and its Department of Community Development and Applied Economics (CDAE), which administers three undergraduate majors, including; Community Entrepreneurship, Community & International Development, Public Communication; and two graduate programs; M.S. Community Development and Applied Economics, and a Master of Public Administration.

Also housed in Morrill Hall are; the Center for Rural Studies, the Community Outreach Partnership Center (COPC), the Office of Community-University Partnerships & Service Learning (CUPS), and the Vermont Regional Office of the Peace Corps.

== Architecture ==
The architect of the building was Charles Wyman Buckham, the son of the 11th University of Vermont president Matthew Henry Buckham. An 1891 graduate of the University of Vermont, Charles Buckham continued his architectural studies at the National Academy of Design (currently known as the National Academy Museum & School) in New York City, Columbia University, and at institutions in Paris. He was the designer of the State Office Building in Montpelier, Vermont, among a number of other notable buildings in Vermont, New York City, and Minnesota.

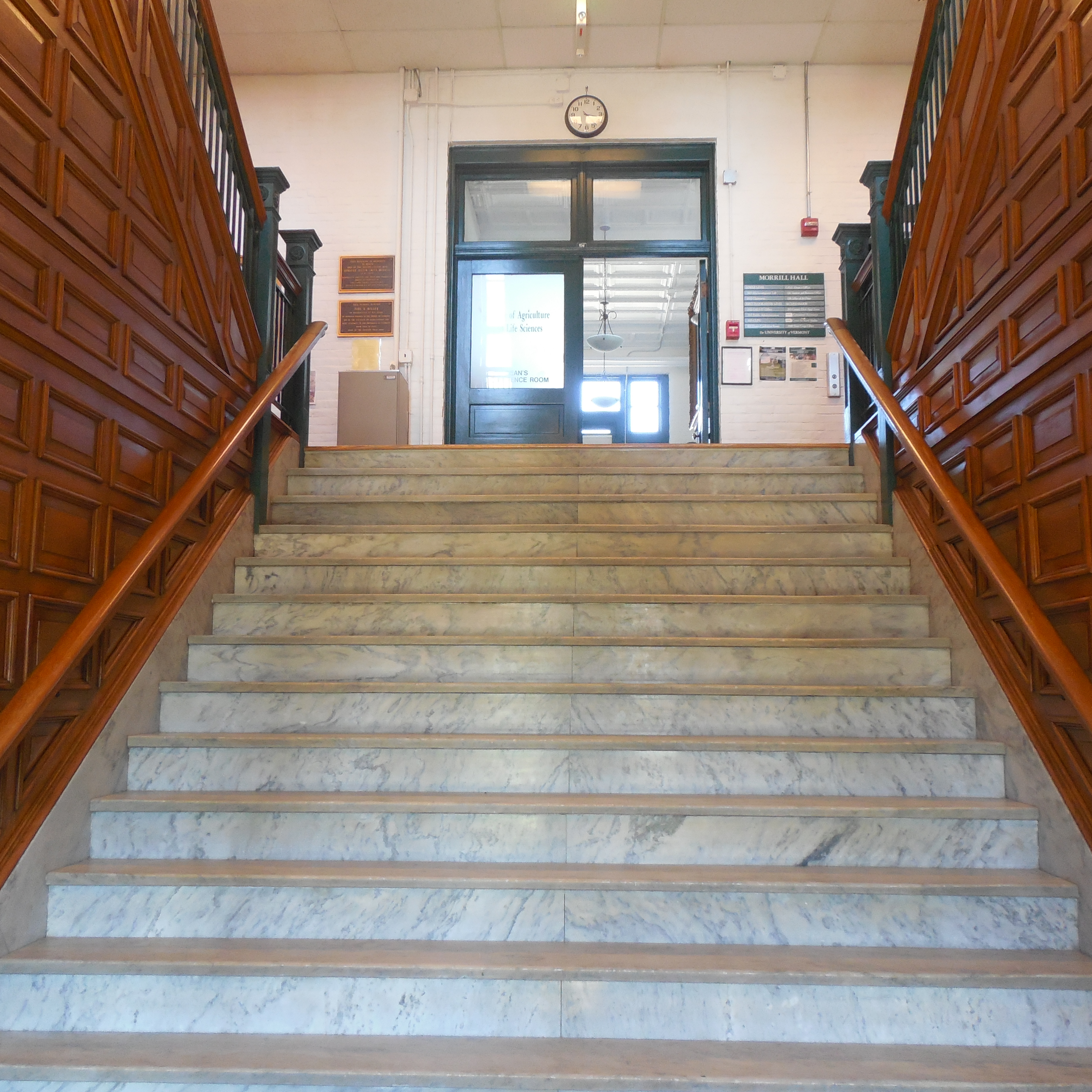
Marble stairway of the first floor front entrance of UVM Morrill Hall

Morrill Hall is a three-story building (including a basement) built using rusticated brick with terra-cotta trim. From a centered and (generally) west-facing, semi-portico structure extends the main entrance, which is topped with a pediment adorned with the Great Seal of Vermont. The entrance way is adjoined by two 23' 3" granite columns; each weighing about thirteen tons and measuring a diameter of 2' 10" at the base, and 2' 5" at the summit. The steps to the front door are built from Woodbury granite. The wide sixteen-step inner staircase ascending from the main entrance to first floor is made of marble and complemented by walls of carved paneling. The wooden floors on the upper-levels are made of North Carolina pine.

The building has a length (north-south) of 112 ft. and a width (east-west) of 62'. The total floor area is 28,169 ft^{2} (gross area) and 19,574 ft^{2} (finished area). An unfinished attic accounts for 6,944 ft^{2} of gross floor space, which is primarily used for storage.

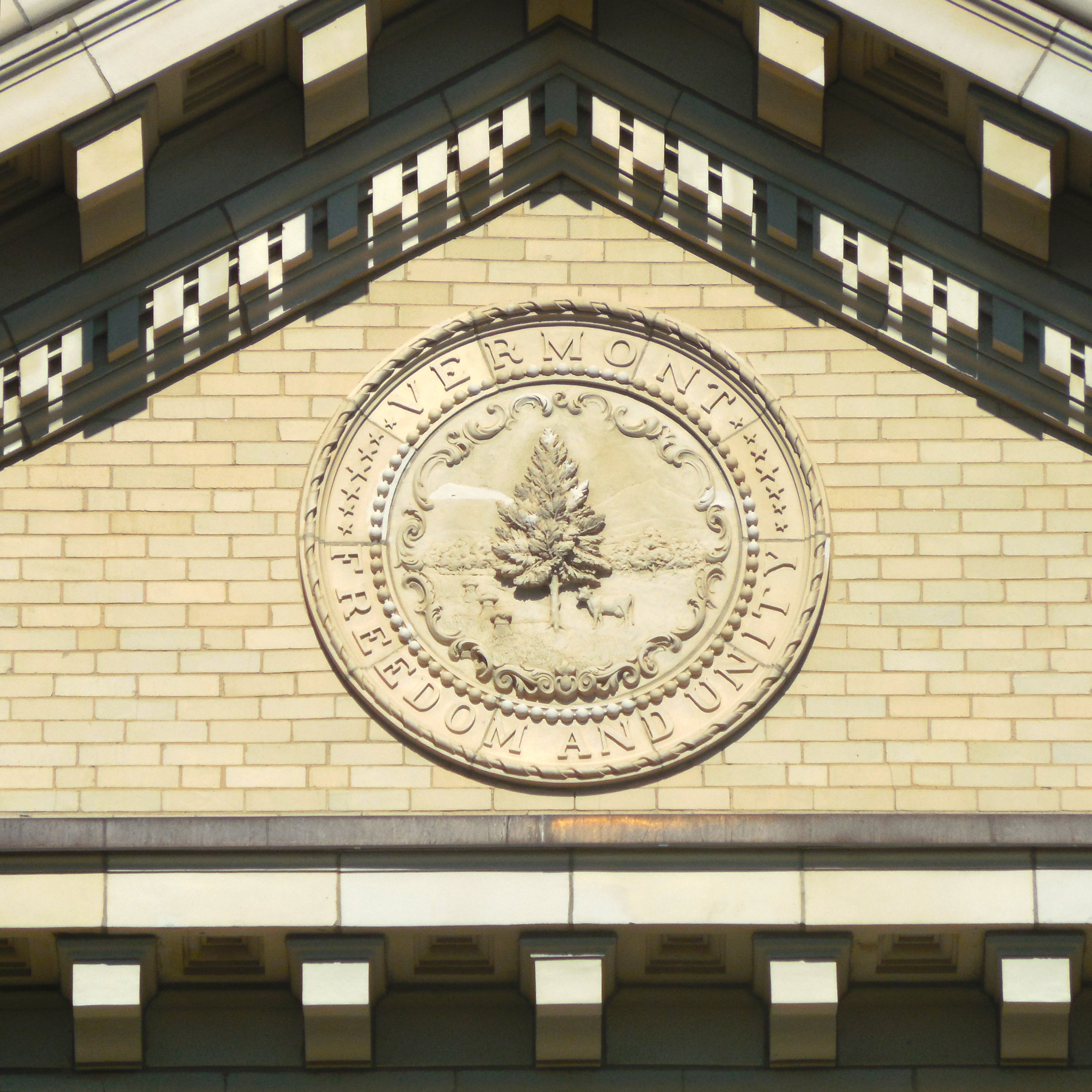
Seal of Vermont adorning the pediment of Morrill Hall's facade

A 2000 UVM Historic Preservation Program report describes Morrill Hall as a "Neoclassical style building"

"Three stories in height, including a tall basement, it is rectangular with a widely overhanging, flared, and bracketed hipped roof of red Spanish tile. The building is faced with American bond yellow brick with a random rusticated rock faced sandstone ashlar foundation (with tinted mortar), and molded brick water table. The main block extends three bays to either side of the central pavilion. There are seven bays on the rear of the building and four on either end. All windows, except as noted, are paired, one-over-one, double hung with aluminum storm sash. Second story windows on the front facade and both ends have arched tops."

— UVM, Historic Preservation Program, 2000

A 1956 architectural analysis report further describes Morrill Hall as "late Victorian Eclectic" with its balance of structure and some of the window arches having a "Palladian influence":

"The stress placed by the architect on the entrance is reminiscent of the Baroque, although the rest of the building has none of the distortion of most examples of that style. In addition to emphasizing the entrance by projecting it forward, Buckham added two massive Ionic columns which flank the main door. Here he borrows from the Classical Revival era but provides his own touch by resting the columns on brick supports which rise several feet above ground level. The roof is a somewhat modified Mansard type which is found in the Second French Empire style. The roof design aids in preserving the proportions of the building and avoiding a top heavy look. There is a three foot roof overhang all around the building which suggests a 'capped' effect."

— Davis, William J., An Architectural Analysis of Morrill Agricultural Hall, 1956

Emergency exits are mounted on the rear of the building which traverse the central bays of the second and third stories. Open steel grated stairways and railings are assembled with horizontal platforms positioned at each exit, and at a halfway point between each level. The emergency exit doors are primarily made of glass with sidelights and transoms.

== Photo gallery ==
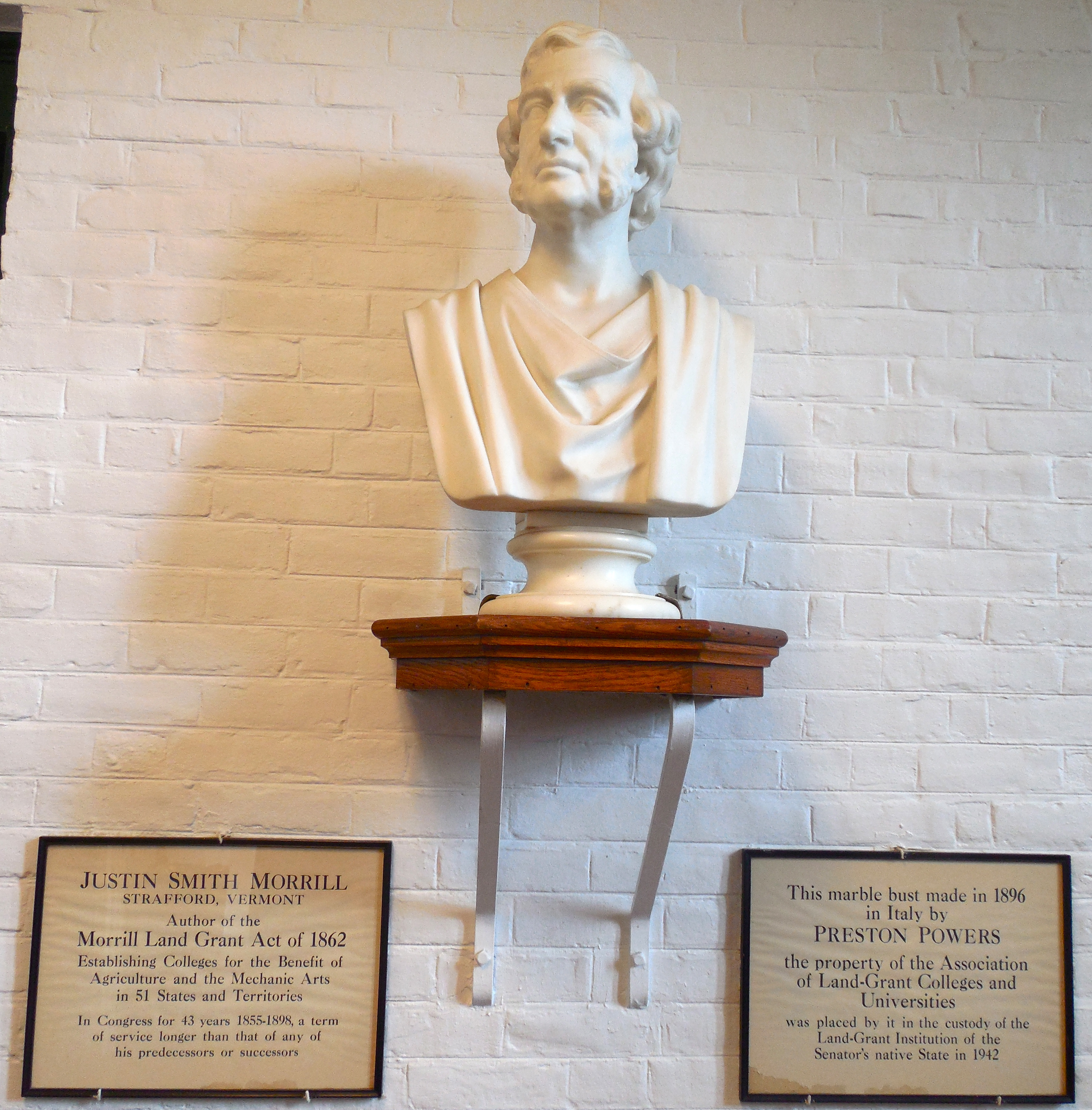
Marble bust of Sen. Justin Smith Morrill (1810–1898) at UVM Morrill Hall

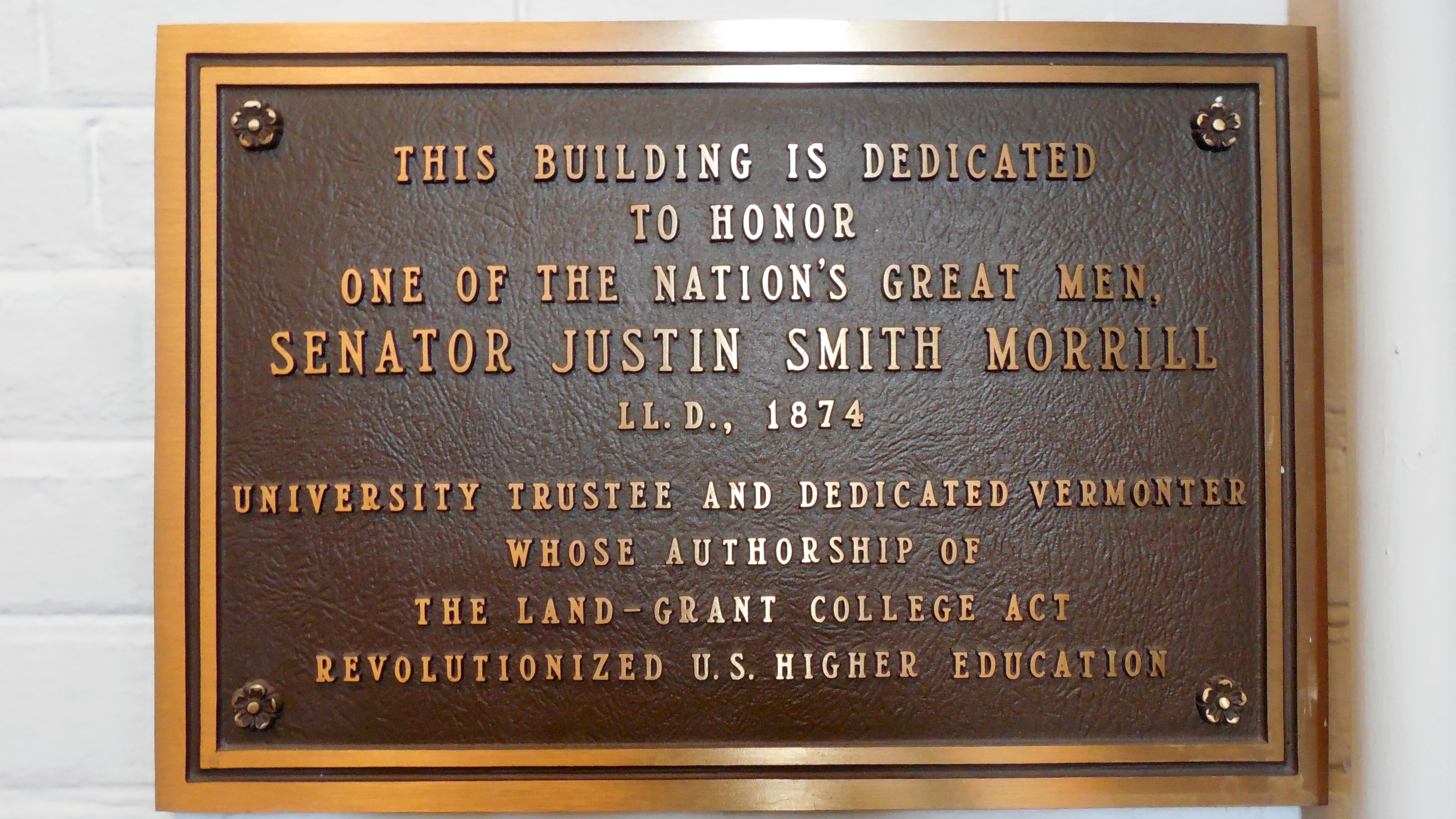
Dedication plaque to Senator Justin Smith Morrill

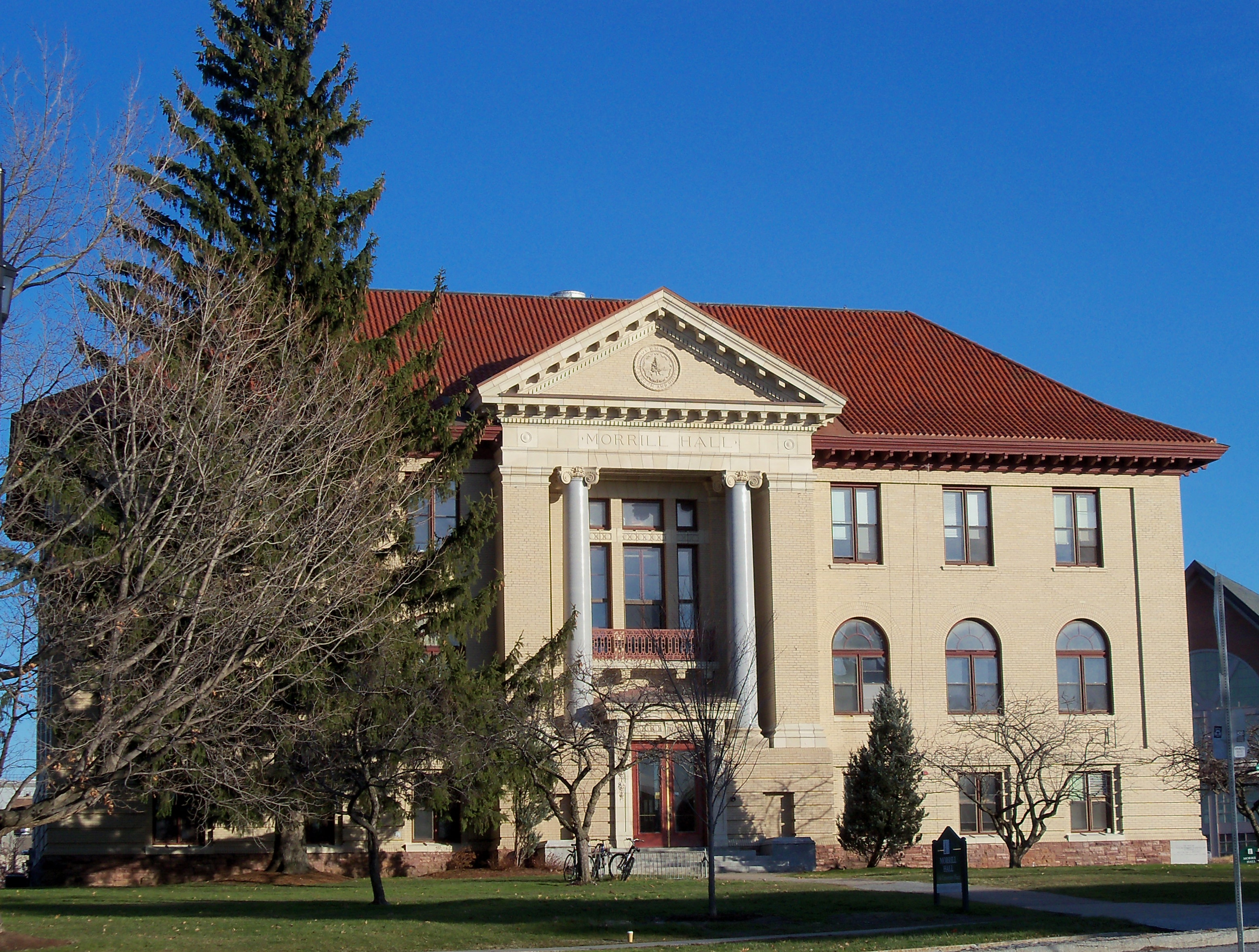
Morrill Hall on the campus of the University of Vermont, Burlington, VT, Dec 2012

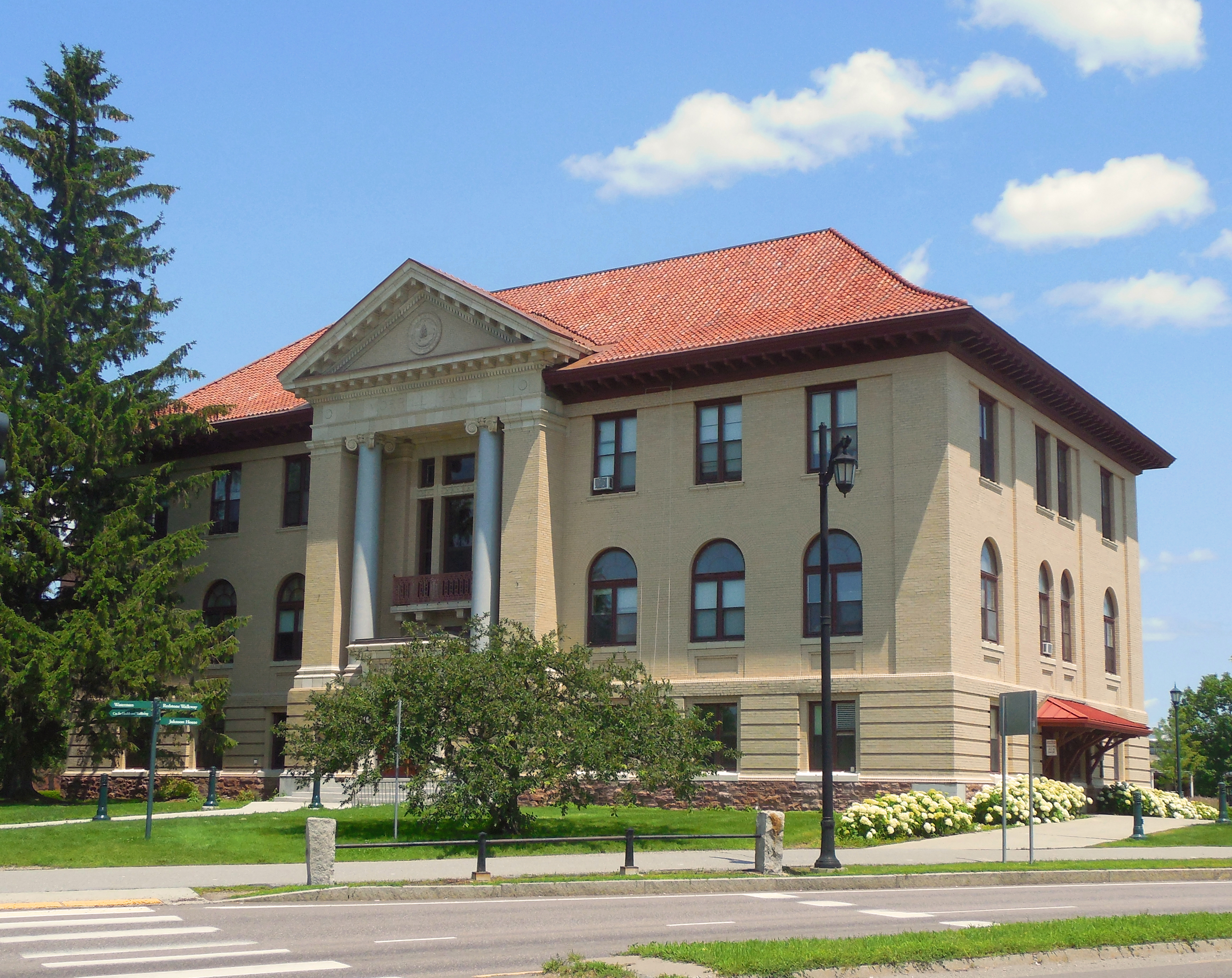
View of Morrill Hall, UVM from the southwest corner, Jul 2015

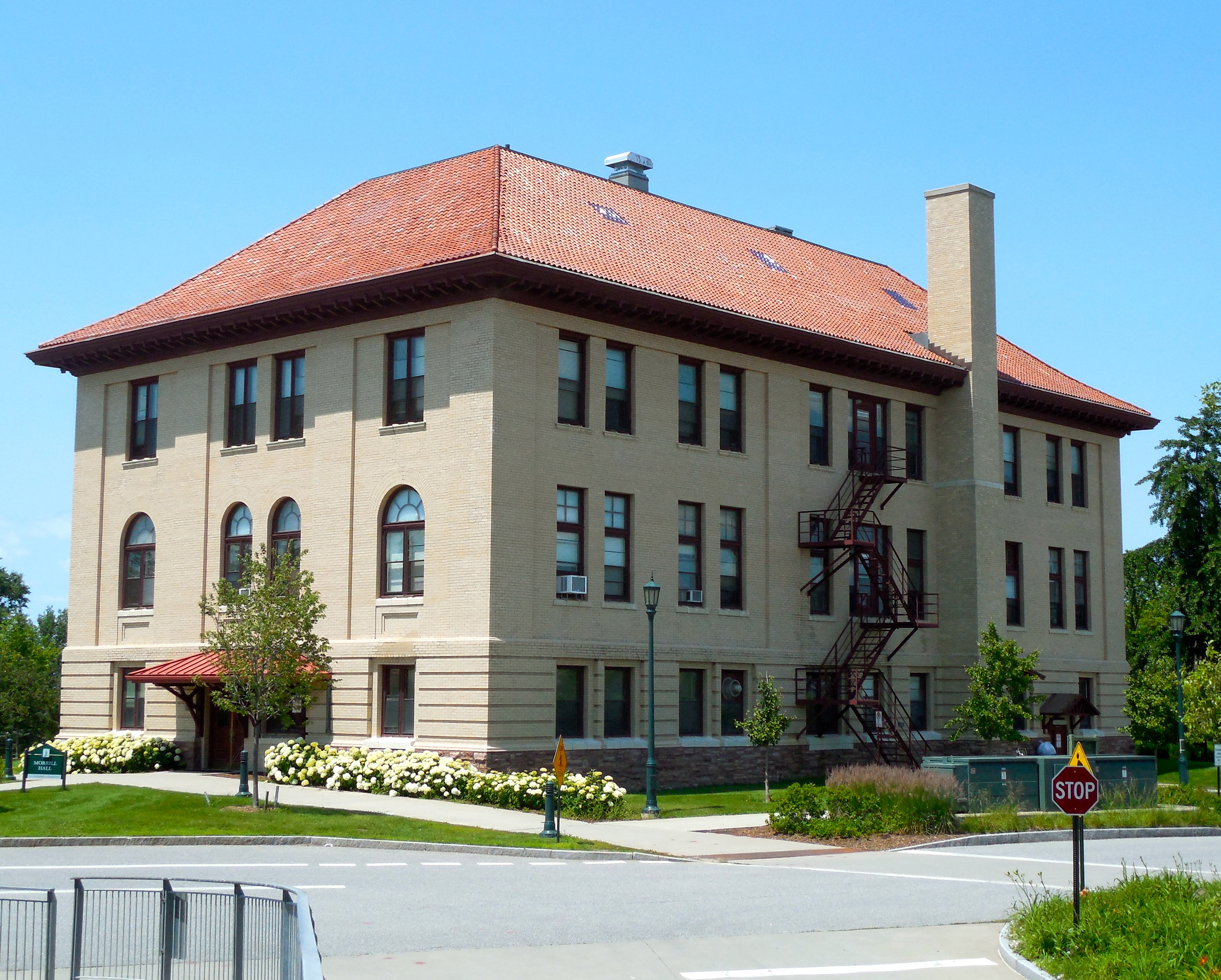
Southern and eastern entrances of Morrill Hall, UVM, Burlington, VT, Jul 2015

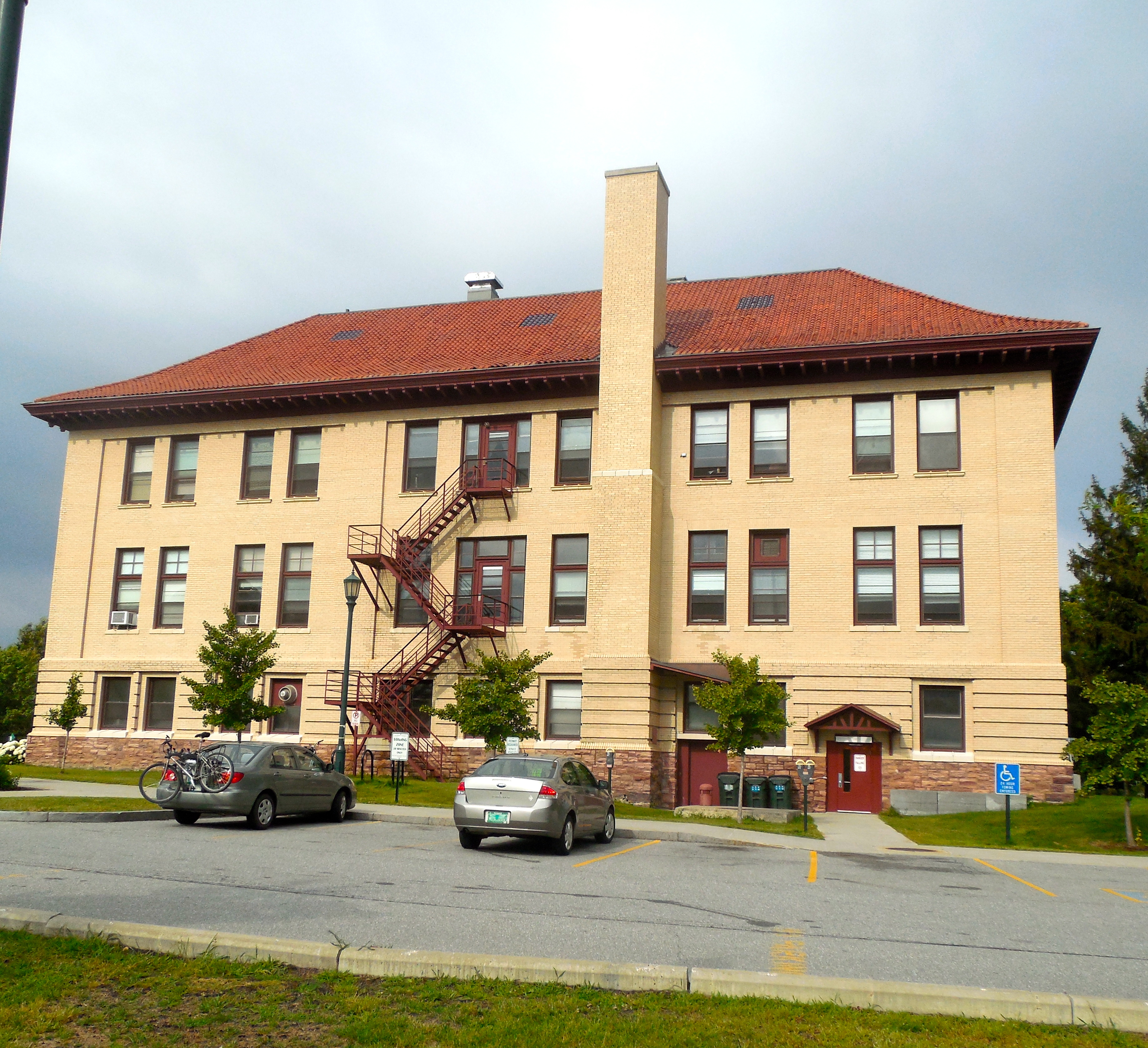
Rear view of Morrill Hall, University of Vermont, Jul 2015

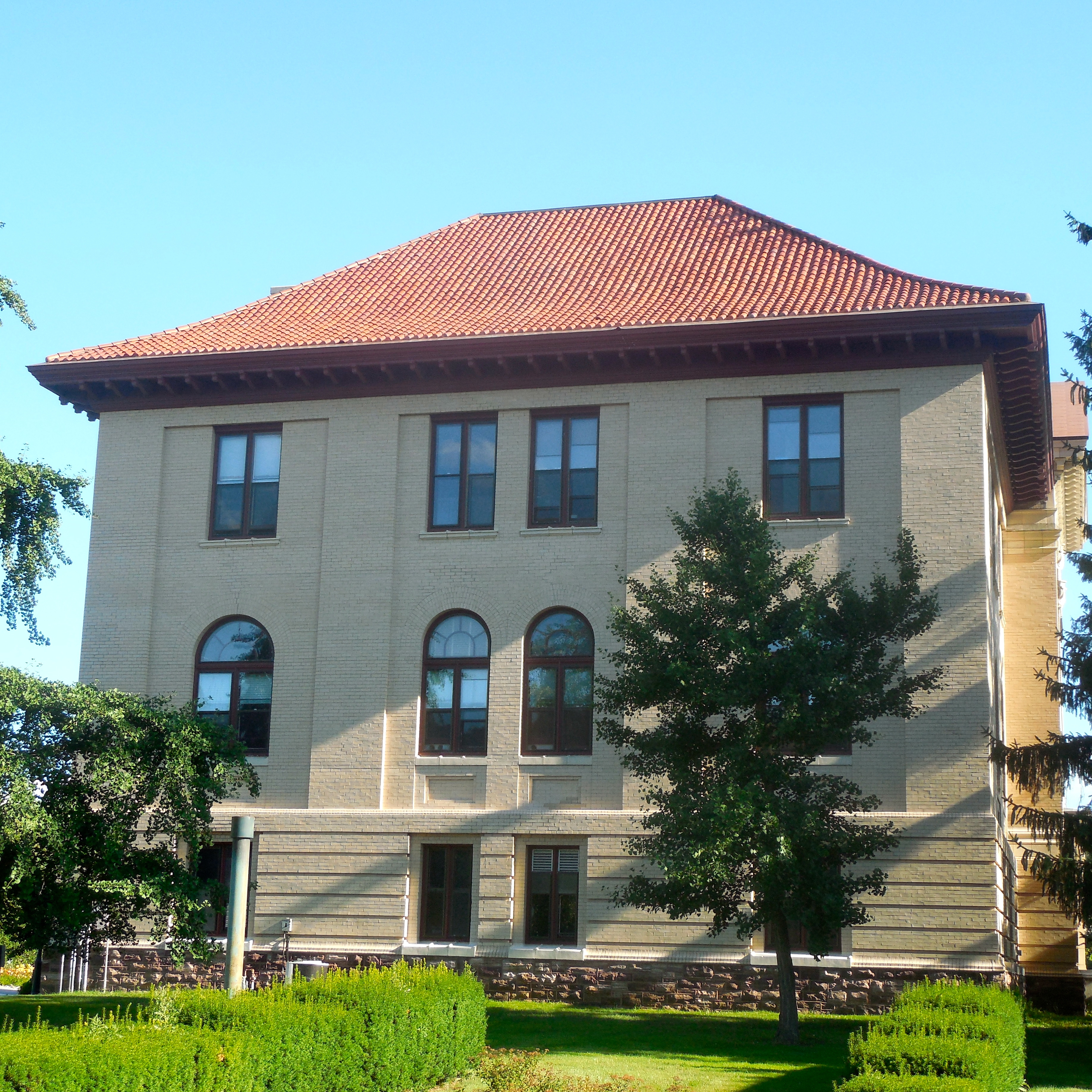
View of Morrill Hall from the north, University of Vermont, Jul 2015

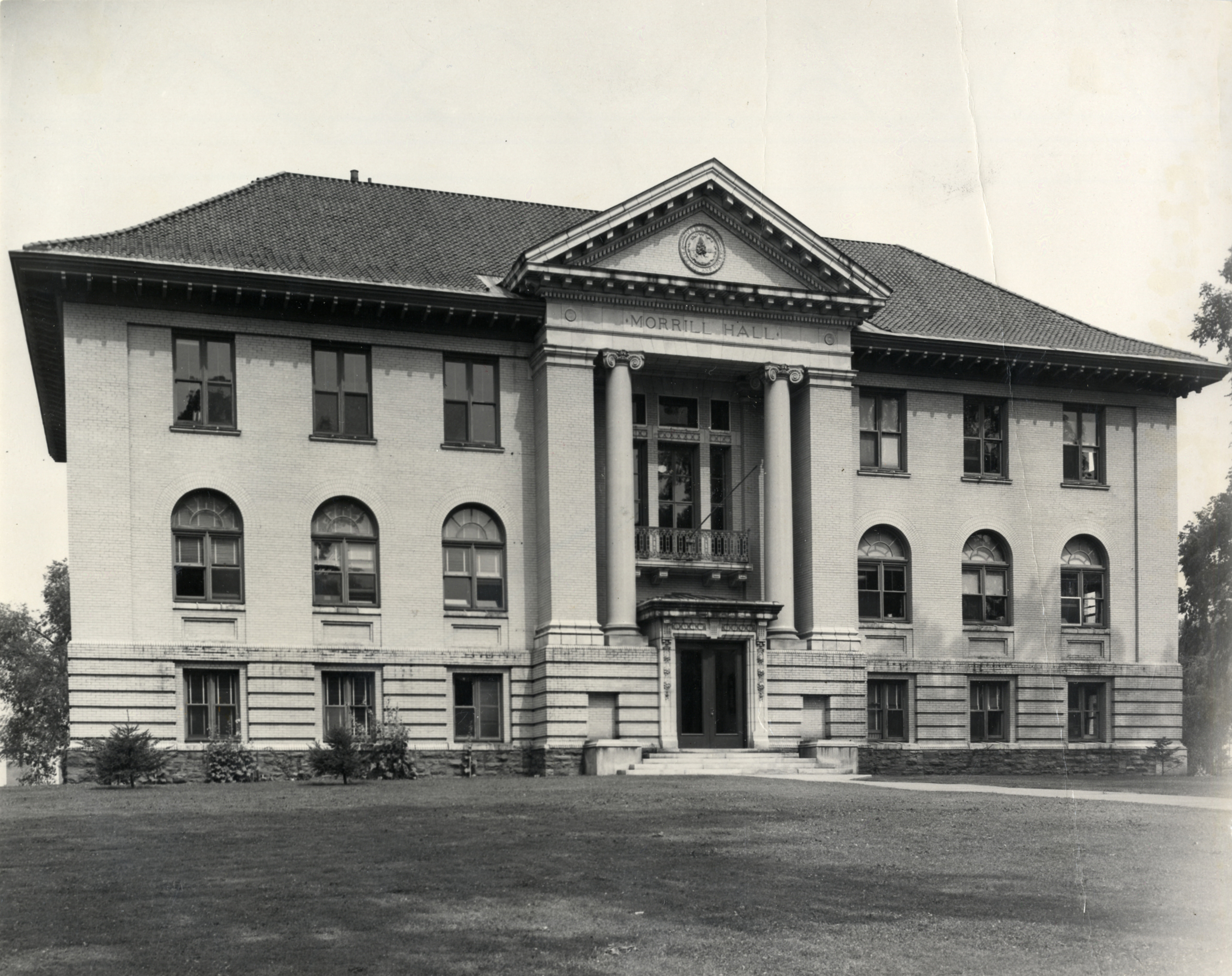
Morrill Hall, University of Vermont, Burlington, VT, Jul 1953

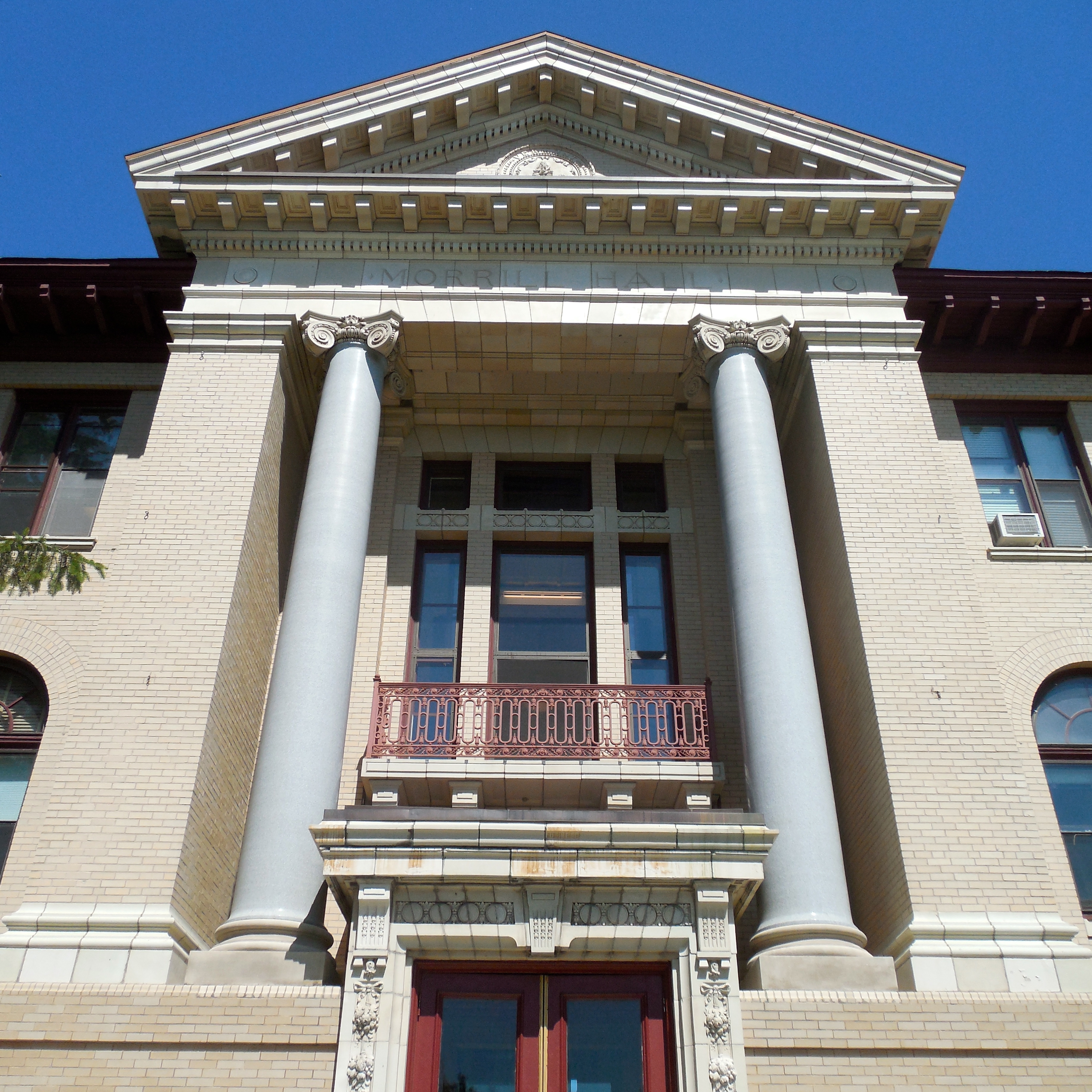
Columns at the front entrance of Morrill Hall, UVM, Burlington, VT, Jul 2015

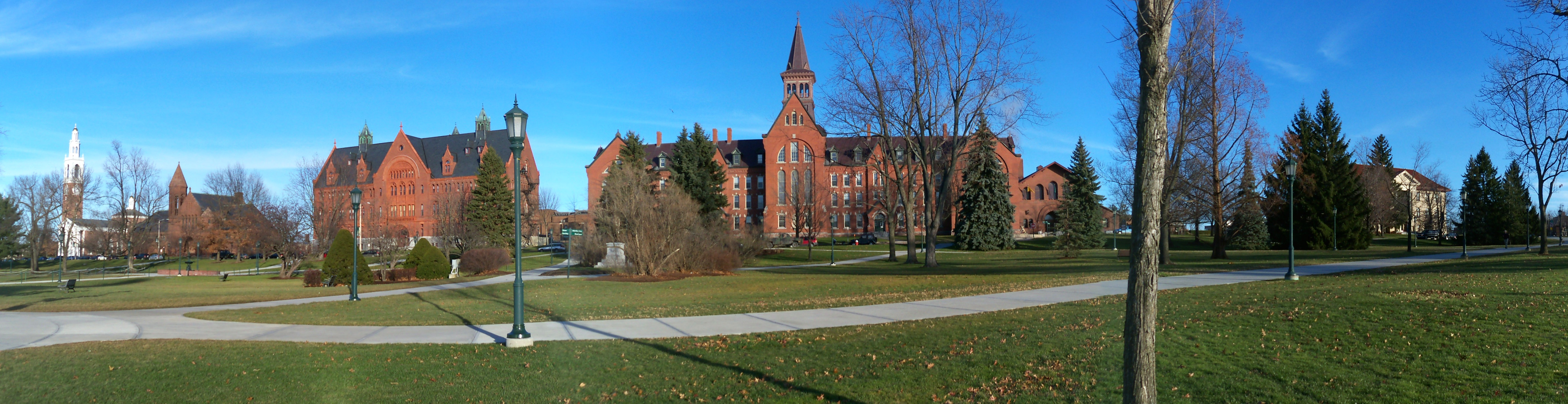
Panorama taken of the UVM Green (from the west). Morrill Hall is located on the far right of the image, Dec 2012

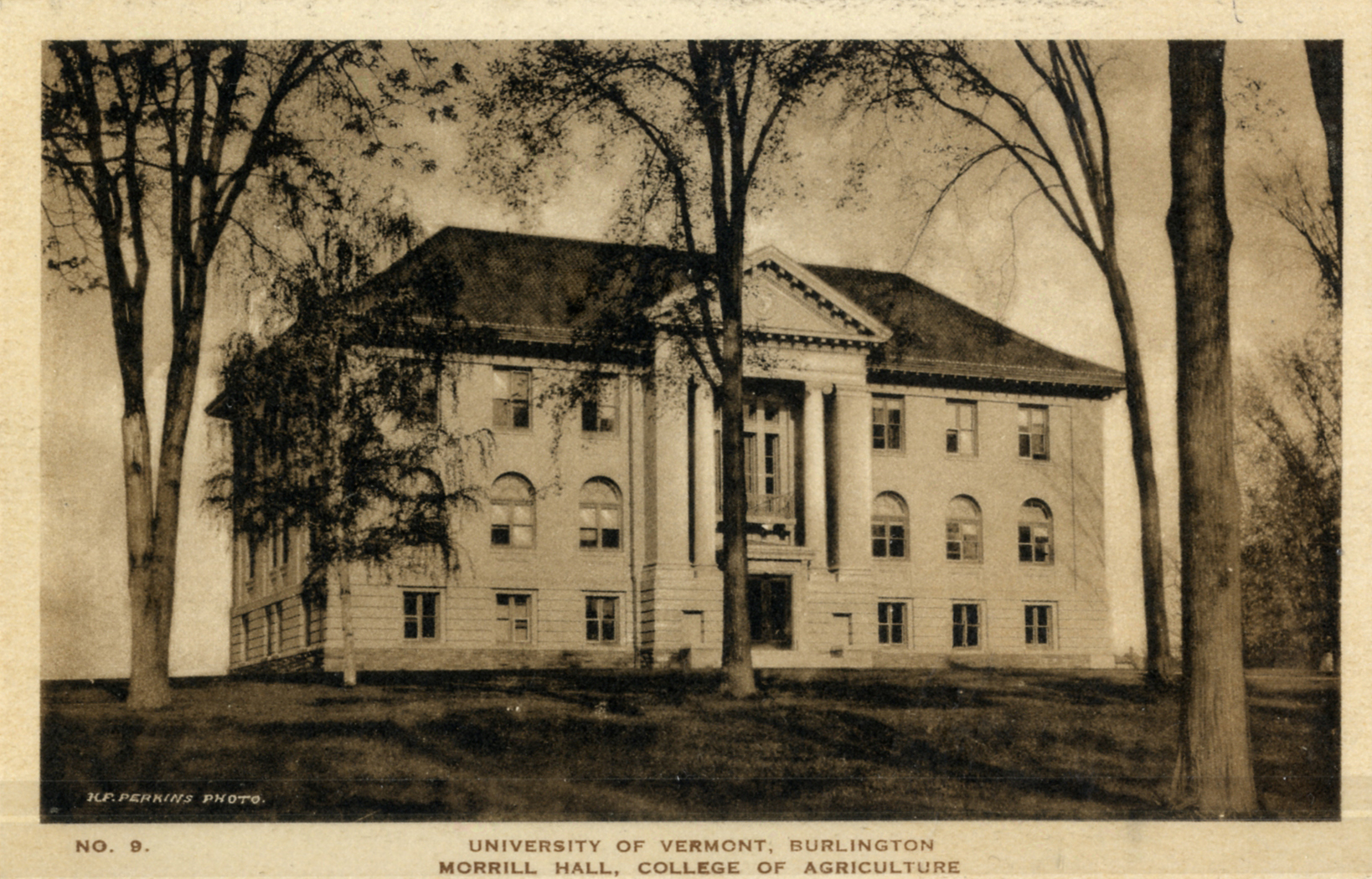
Postcard of Morrill Hall, University of Vermont (dated 4 Jul 1920)

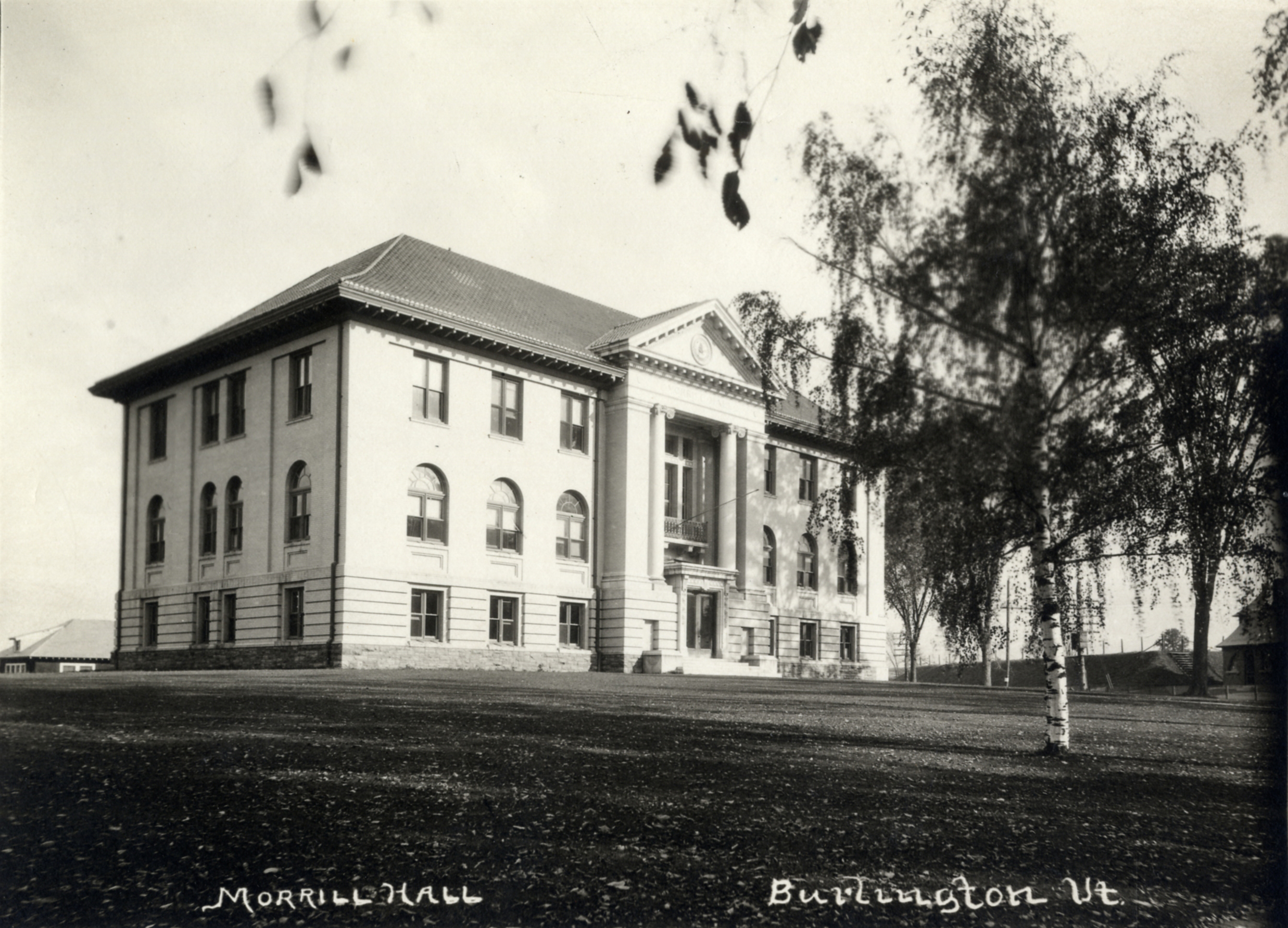
Morrill Hall, University of Vermont, early 1900s
