= Grasse Mount =

- U.S. National Register of Historic Places
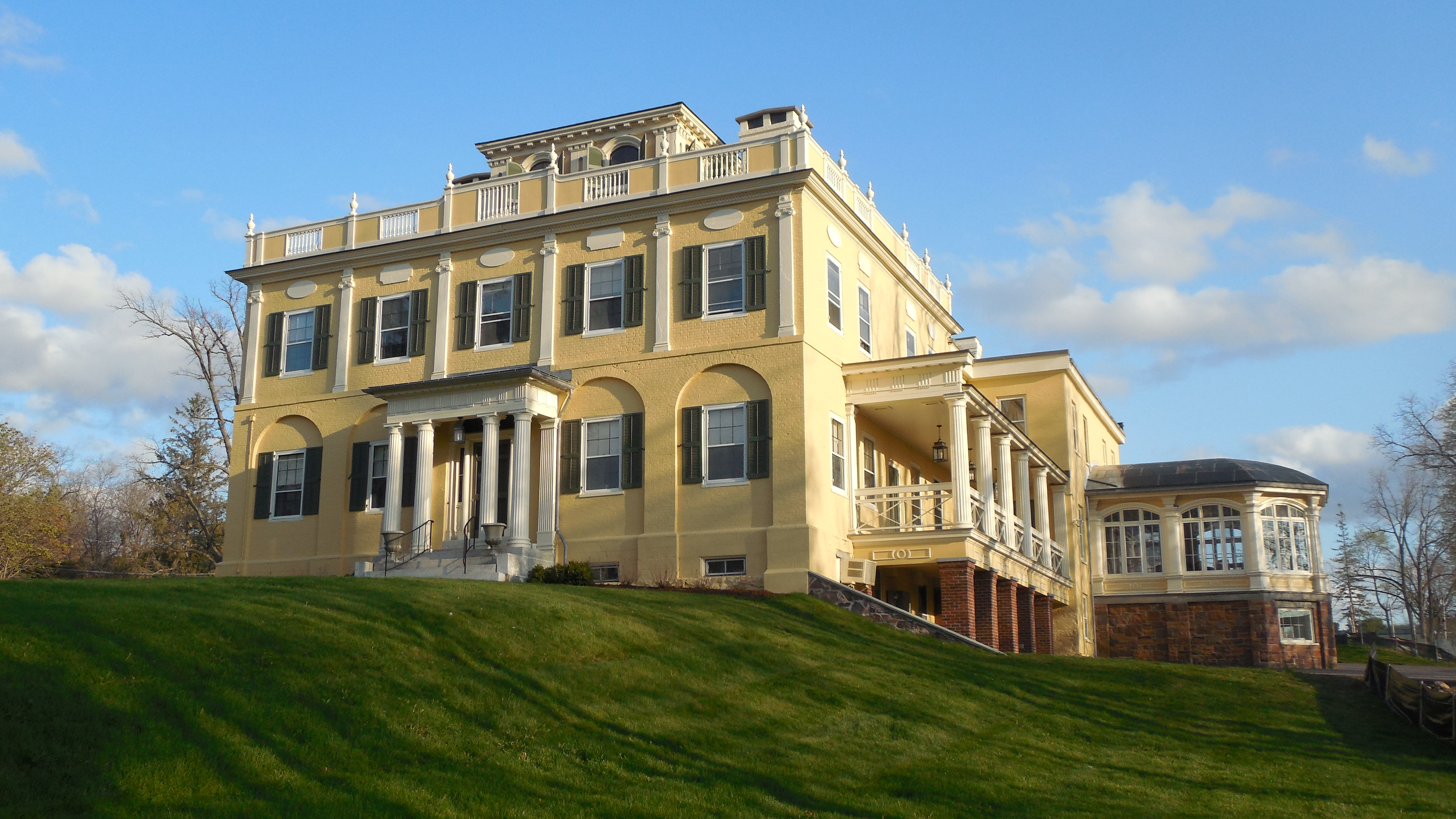
- Grasse Mount, May 2016

- Location within Vermont Location within the United States
- Location: 411 Main St., Burlington, Vermont
- Coordinates: 44°28′33″N 73°12′12″W
- Built: 1804
- Architect: John Johnson
- Architectural style: Georgian colonial, Adamesque-Federal style, and Italianate
- NRHP reference No.: 73000193
- Added to NRHP: April 11, 1973

Grasse Mount (otherwise known as the Thaddeus Tuttle House) is a campus building of the University of Vermont (UVM), which is located on 411 Main Street (adjacent to the intersection of Summit Street) in Burlington, Vermont. Built in 1804 for Captain Thaddeus Tuttle (1758–1836), a local merchant, the building was designed by architect and surveyor John Johnson and constructed by carpenter Abram Stevens. By 1824, Tuttle had lost his fortune and sold the property to Vermont Governor Cornelius Van Ness. Named after French Admiral François Joseph Paul de Grasse "Grasse Mount" was added to the National Register of Historic Places on April 11, 1973.

== History ==
The land of the estate was originally owned by Ira Allen who served as an officer in the Green Mountain Boys militia (under his brother Ethan Allen) during the American Revolutionary War, and was also the founder of the University of Vermont. Allen claimed that he had been swindled out of the land by Captain Thaddeus Tuttle while he was abroad attempting to negotiate trade with England, and to purchase arms for the Vermont militia from France, at the behest of Governor Thomas Chittenden. The trip was delayed for some eight years by what was known as the Olive Branch Affair, where Allen was arrested and spent years detained in England and France. By the time of Allen's return his financial empire was in shambles, he had lost most of his land holdings, and was eventually forced to flee Burlington or face debtors' prison.

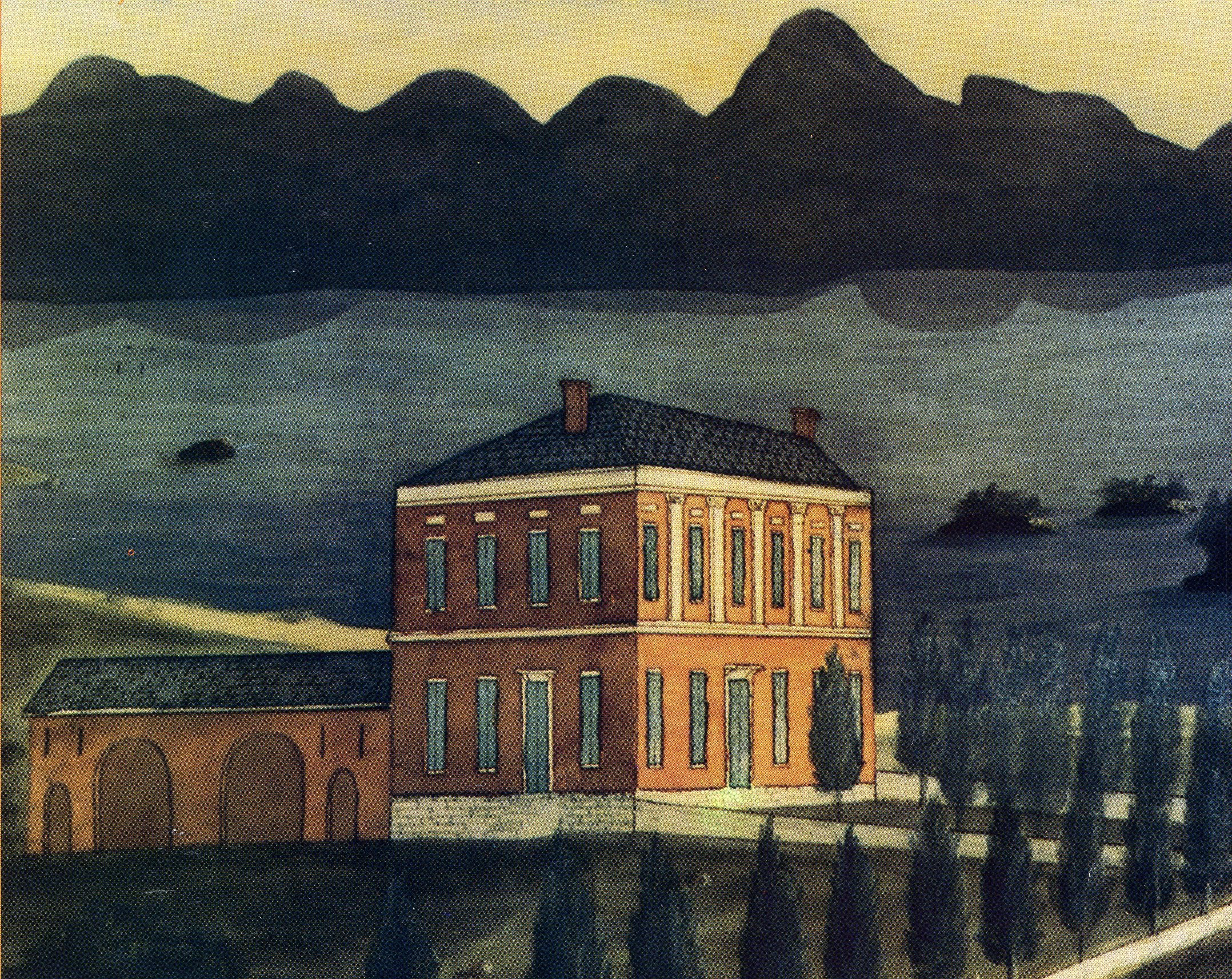
Watercolor of the "Thaddeus Tuttle House" by John Joseph Holland (circa 1810), possibly painted from memory or by employing artistic license, as the face of the mansion is portrayed with an additional bay on the northern elevation, and minus one on the east.

Sometime before 1797, Tuttle had started his mercantile business. By 1804, the same year that he had Grasse Mount built, he had also constructed a store on the corner of Main and South Prospect Streets in Burlington, Vermont, at the building known today as "Bittersweet". Historical records indicate that Captain Tuttle had also become involved in land speculation and possessed considerable holdings within the towns of Coventry, Shelburne, and Westford, Vermont. On 1 September 1817, Tuttle sold Grasse Mount and its entire estate of about 90 acres of land to Cornelius P. Van Ness for $9,000. However, three months later Van Ness inexplicably sold the entire estate back to Tuttle for the price of five-dollars, according to the recorded quitclaim deed. The reason for this odd exchange has led to much speculation over time, but is yet unknown. On 29 April 1824, after his business had failed, Tuttle sold the estate once again to the recently elected Governor Van Ness for $6,000. The sale included all but one acre of land along the northeast corner of the property, which had been previously conveyed to Icabod Tuttle. Until his death in 1836, Tuttle resided on the property where his store had been built, just west of the estate. Historical accounts reflect the reason for Tuttle's bankruptcy was due to his business operating primarily on the basis of barter where there was very little handling of actual monies, and therefore the construction and sustained maintenance of Grasse Mount "was more than he could carry".

In 1826, Van Ness declined re-election to the Governorship and practiced law in Burlington until he accepted an appointment of United States Ambassador to Spain by President Andrew Jackson in 1829; a position he held until 1839. During this period "Grasse Mount" was so named after the French Admiral François Joseph Paul de Grasse by Heman Allen (of Colchester) (nephew of Ira Allen and the former first United States Ambassador to Chile) who occupied the estate during Van Ness's absence.

=== Visit of General Lafayette ===
On July 29, 1825 during his tour of the twenty-four states of the country, the famed American Revolutionary War General, Marquis de Lafayette was entertained at the Grasse Mount estate after laying the cornerstone for the "South College" building at the University of Vermont. He did not spend the evening there according to a long-standing legend, but rather departed for Whitehall, New York around 11:00pm that evening via the steamship Phoenix, which had embarked from Burlington wharf. By the late 19th century, such renown had been made of General Lafayette's visit that university officials had earnestly considered renaming the building Lafayette Hall.

=== The Leavenworth Period: 1845-1853 ===
Grasse Mount was sold for $14,000 on 12 July 1845 to attorney Henry Leavenworth, conveyed in the deed with 81.5 acres of land. Leavenworth who was elected as a Vermont State Representative (circa 1850) did not initially dwell on the estate, and from 1845-1850 Grasse Mount was actually occupied by John Cutler. Originally, the estate extended south to what was known as Overlake Park (where a neighborhood street of the same name exists today). Leavenworth divided the land into a number of housing lots and laid out two new streets along the property; Summit Street along the eastern perimeter, and Prospect St. (currently named Maple St.) along the south. The remainder of the estate including the mansion was sold in March 1853 for $12,000 to Captain Charles B. Marvin, a retired naval officer and merchant who had survived the shipwreck of a vessel which he commanded in 1848, and then made a fortune during the 1849 California Gold Rush.

=== The Marvin Period: 1853-1866 ===
Captain Marvin had married a local Burlington woman by the name of Ellen Blackman before purchasing Grasse Mount. Marvin hence financed a number of additions to the mansion, including an Italianate belvedere (cupola) structure upon the rooftop, a gas-powered illumination system, the replacement of older small-paned windows with larger-paned sash, and the replacement of wooden fireplace mantels with Italian marble. Where the exterior was painted pink with green shutters, the interior was painted with a number of ornate frescos throughout its eight main rooms, stairwell, and the cupola. Spending about $10,000 over the course of a decade, Marvin employed what historians estimate to have been at least two Italian professional artisans (most likely a master and an apprentice) who used watercolors and distempers to hand-paint numerous scenes from his seafaring years, including palm trees, shorelines, windmills, ships, international seaports, as well as cherubs, garlands, and other classical patterns in the form of trompe-l'œil (translated in French as "trick of the eye"), where the images convey the optical illusion of having three-dimensions. In the belvedere, the artisans employed a shadowing technique with the trompe-l'œil panels, which suggested flooding sunlight emanating from the western windows. Because subsequent owners wallpapered, painted, added furring strips, fiberboard, and drywall over the imagery, all but that within the cupola remained undiscovered for over a century. In 1858, Marvin mortgaged the estate for $20,000 to the Bank of Burlington. Historical records also indicate that the Marvins were a mobile family. In 1862, a daughter was born to them in San Francisco, and a son in 1865 in New York.

=== The Barnes Period: 1866-1892 ===
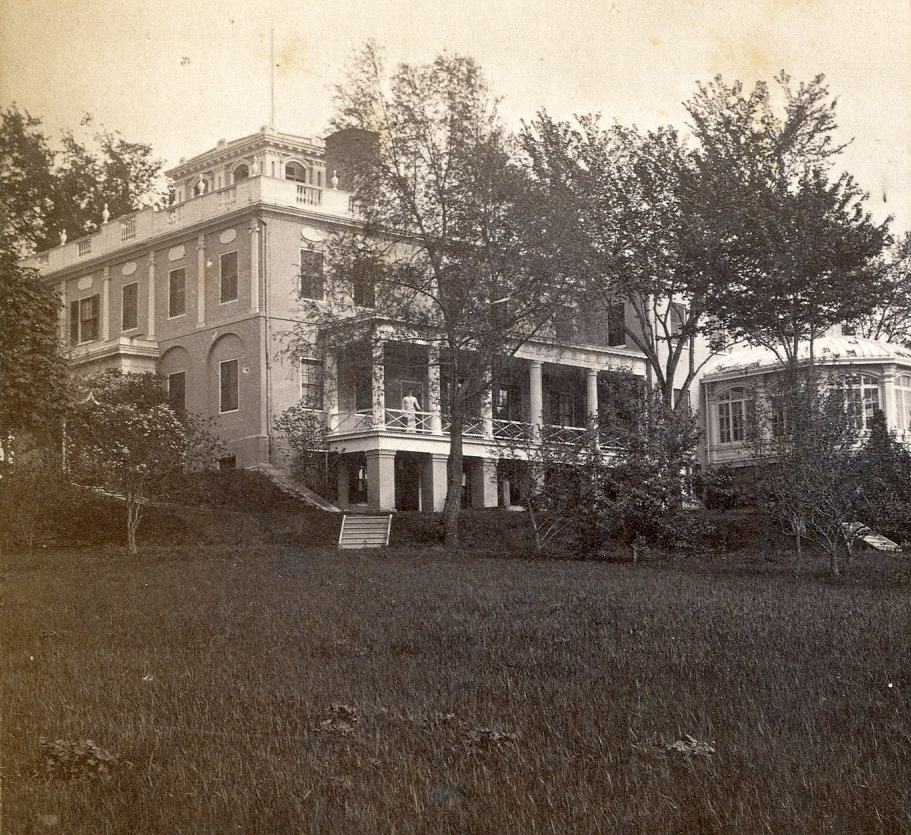
Grasse Mount during the years occupied by the Barnes family, sometime between 1866-1892

On 7 April 1866, Lawrence Barnes (1815-1886) of Hillsboro, New Hampshire, a local businessman involved in the lumber industry who served as president of the Howard Bank, and was noted for helping to introduce the marble trade in the city (as well as posthumously, becoming the namesake of the Lawrence Barnes Elementary School in Burlington) purchased the estate for $35,000 from Captain Marvin who decided to move with his family back to California during that year. By this time, the perimeter of the estate was greatly reduced, bounded by six parcels along Willard St. to the west, by Summit St. to the east, Main St. to the north, and Maple St. (née Prospect St.) to the south. During the period of Barnes's ownership, a conservatory was constructed on the west side of the mansion and a two-story brick ell expanded an earlier (possibly wooden) structure on the southern side. Indoor plumbing and coal-burning fireplaces were also added. At its maximum, Grasse Mount had five fireplaces installed on the first floor and four on the second (some have since been covered over). Unimpressed with the Marvins' intricate interior artwork, referring to it as "them naked images", Barnes's wife, Lucinda painted over or wallpapered all of the frescos and paintings, except those within the belvedere. Considered to be a modernization practice of interior design of the era, much of the artwork was replaced with stenciled geometric motifs of leaves and vines. Mrs. Barnes also replaced the interior pine woodwork with stronger black walnut, and the carved wooden mantelpieces with marble pieces imported from Spain. After Lawrence Barnes's passing on 21 June 1886, Lucinda continued to occupy the home until her death in 1892.

=== University of Vermont ownership ===
On 19 May 1894, Edward Wells purchased the property from the Barnes family estate in order to buffer his home (which abutted Grasse Mount to the south) from potentially undesirable neighbors. The house was left empty until 1 July 1895 when the University of Vermont purchased the three-acre estate for $12,000, which was considered to be about half of the property's actual value. The mansion was hence converted into a dormitory for the university's women students, initially housing thirteen female students. By 1966, this had increased to 29 students living at Grasse Mount. The building was utilized as a women's residence hall until 1971.

For some period between 1911 and 1940, Professor Bertha Terrill who was serving as the university's first "Dean of Women" lived at Grasse Mount.

In 1915, the women who lived in Grasse Mount raised the funds to install hardwood floors, replacing the old-fashioned wide boards. Further extensive repairs, redecoration, and refinishing took place in 1929. In the autumn of that year, the exterior of the building was painted in the creamy yellow color that would be recognized today.

Sometime before 1930 during its years serving as a residence hall, a song had been written by the students who lived there and had developed a nostalgia for Grasse Mount;

"Spirit of Grasse Mounte, come to us, we pray. Roll back the curtain from the dusty past; Show us the joys which follow you today. Help us to keep your vision to the last."

— Pearl Randall Wasson, From the "Spirit of Grasse Mounte"

During 1972, a three-phase renovation project was undertaken that was intended to restore the building to its historical architectural context. Modifications first included safety and code requirements for heating, structural and electrical repairs. The second phase restored the main parlors, main circular staircase, and three bedrooms at the front of the mansion. The final phase of the project involved restoring the exterior of the building. Subsequently, the UVM Office of Continuing Education was located on the first floor, where the second floor was converted into offices that were made available to the United States Department of Agriculture.

Additional restoration efforts were undertaken in 1985, costing about $700,000.

== Current use and occupancy ==
Grass Mount today houses the offices of the University of Vermont Alumni Association.

== Grasse Mount's interior wall and ceiling paintings ==
In 1984, workers renovating Grasse Mount for the relocation of the alumni and development offices had unexpectedly discovered unique nineteenth-century wall art, which had been hidden under layers of paint and wallpaper. Eric Groves, an architectural conservator who was working for the firm Kielman and Batten had first discovered stenciled wall and ceiling imagery on the second floor southeast chamber, which led to an extensive investigation of each room in the building. The university architect at the time, Robert Holdridge contacted the National Park Service, which referred the restoration team to the Albert K. Perry Company of Boston, Massachusetts. The company dispatched their historic decorative painting specialist Brian Powell to the find in order to help remove the layers of paint using a chemical process. The artwork from the 1850s Marvin period was revealed within thirteen rooms, where the stencil work from the 1870s Barnes era was found in four rooms.

The Marvin period architectural renderings on the first floor were characterized as having the "touch of the master" and further described as "spontaneous, decisive, and accurate" according to the conservators, where the imagery in the cupola is "absolutely measured out to ensure proper perspective, again clear evidence that the individual (or individuals) had received more than informal training."

Each room where the Marvin era art had been found possessed a different theme. A ground floor parlor was found with a circular image of windmills with small ships. The circular staircase walls were adorned with ascending Corinthian columns, the northwest parlor walls were illustrated with palm trees and a rattan motif upon the ceiling, the northeast parlor fireplace is flanked with niches painted as false balconies overlooking alpine scenery, and another second story bedroom was ornamented with an image of an elevated castle that juts over a jagged peninsula. Window and door framing were topped with cartouches. One parlor was found to have an image of Samuel de Champlain discovering Lake Champlain. The three-dimensional trompe-l'œil imagery within the top-level cupola lantern simulates columns and capitals studded with green jewels that project the illusion of sunlight emanating through the windows.

The Barnes era artwork was painted with seven spectrum colors (where the Marvin artwork used eleven colors) which emphasized the application of pink and blue, and consisted of biomorphic and stripe motifs, fleur-de-lis and tulip patterns often applied at chair height utilizing stencils complemented with freehand work. One chamber ceiling biomorphic motif was highlighted with bronze-powdered paint. According to the Perry report, "The clarity and luminosity of colors employed and the mixtures of designs...clearly indicates that this work was performed by an American artisan."

Due to the lack of an adequate budget and the immediate need for the office space, not all of the imagery was restored. In 1986, a full restoration was considered out of the question with an estimated cost of about $500,000. However, some of the rooms were restored with a "window" view to the artwork, the southeast parlor was left uncovered, and two decorated ceilings were removed to storage at the university's Fleming Museum of Art. No imagery was revealed within the ell (i.e. the rear wing of the building). Some of the imagery found on the second floor plastered ceilings had been peppered with gunfire and was therefore damaged beyond possible restoration. However, some shards were salvaged and stored with the intent that someday they could be used as evidence for recreating the ceilings. The remainder of the revealed artwork was surveyed, documented (by taking photographs and tracings), and then covered with a protective non-vinyl wallpaper, affixed with a water-based adhesive for ease of removal during future restoration work.

== Architecture ==
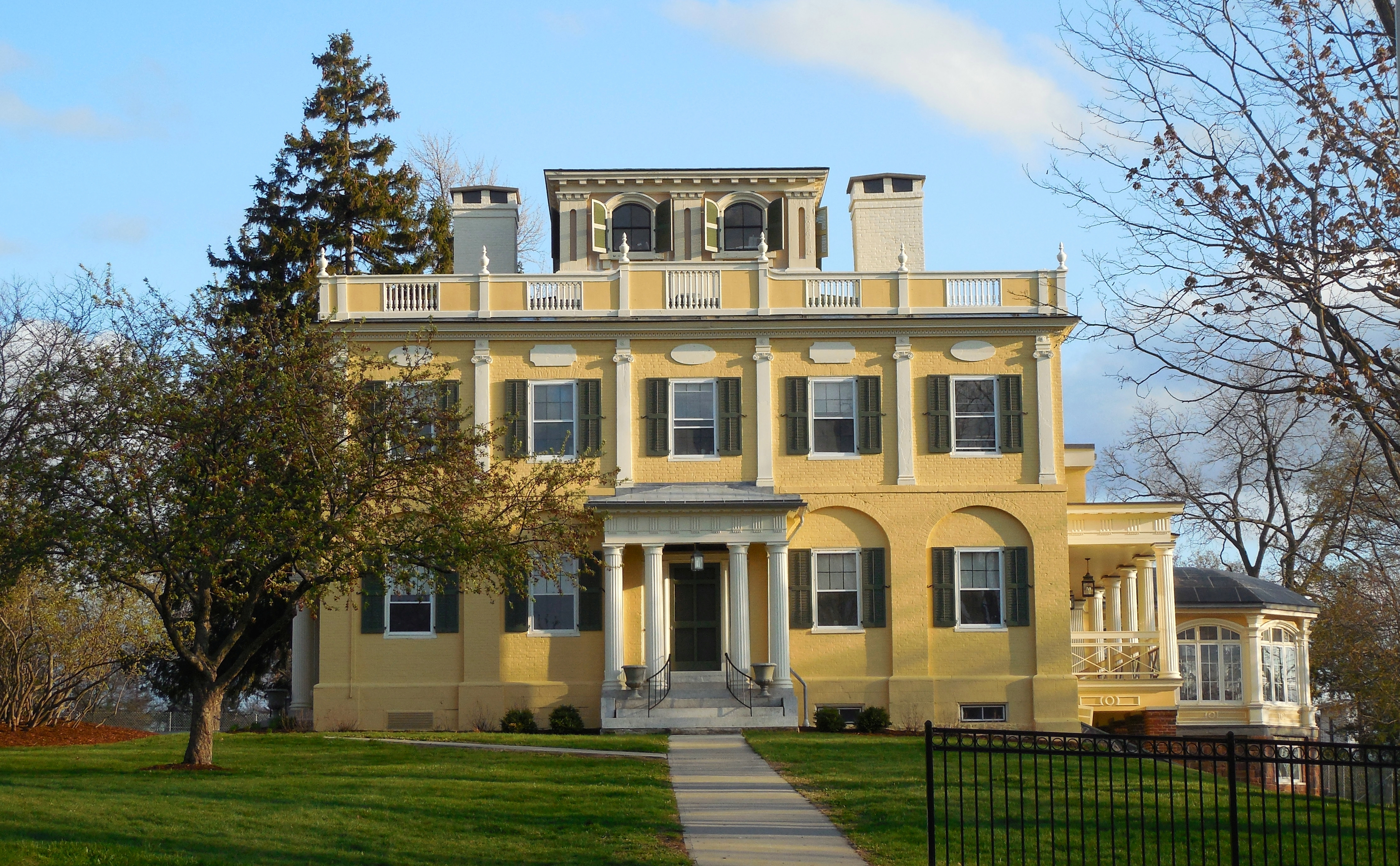
Main entrance of Grasse Mount viewed from Main Street in Burlington, VT

Grasse Mount has been recognized as the best example of a Georgian colonial house within the State of Vermont, and was included in the book "Great Georgian Houses of America", originally published by the Architects' Emergency Committee in 1933. Here the mansion was represented in an illustration with a hipped roof in place of its belvedere structure.

Considered to be a sophisticated example of federal domestic architecture, Grasse Mount is a two-story brick mansion with a hipped-roof, cupola, and balustrade which runs along the perimeter of the roof adorned with cornices between the second story window bays, which are flanked by exterior louvered shutters. The space between each of the flat-arched second story windows and the cornices are adorned with alternating oval and oblong re-entrant angle swag panels. The north-facing facade is five bays wide with the first story bays situated beneath semi-circular blind arches. A brick belt course divides the first and second floors, where six Ionic pilasters originate between each bay and extend to the rooftop cornices, and summit at small urns atop the balustrade. The front door has a fanlight and colored glass sidelights, which is covered by a single story Doric portico complemented by four fluted pillars and two pilasters. The eastern side entrance is located at the center bay of the main house.

The arrangement of the interior design, such as the parlor fireplace which is placed between "round-arched recesses", or the curved staircase, are considered by architectural aficionados to resemble the contemporary design of the John Warren House in Middlebury, Vermont, and may have been influenced by literature such as; "The Country Builder's Assistant" by Asher Benjamin, or "The Practical House Carpenter" by William Pain (both published in 1797).

"The only place that one can find the entire set of details and compositional themes present in Grasse Mount is in the work of Charles Bulfinch in Boston and Salem between about 1794 and 1804."

— Andres, Glenn M. and Johnson, Curtis B., Buildings of Vermont, 2013

Grasse Mount exists on 4.09 acres of land. The mansion is about 60 ft (18 m) wide and 93 ft (28 m) long. The floor area of the mansion has a gross area of 35,467 ft^{2} and 24,817 ft^{2} of finished area. The first floor totals 4,839 ft^{2} gross area/finished area.

== Gallery ==
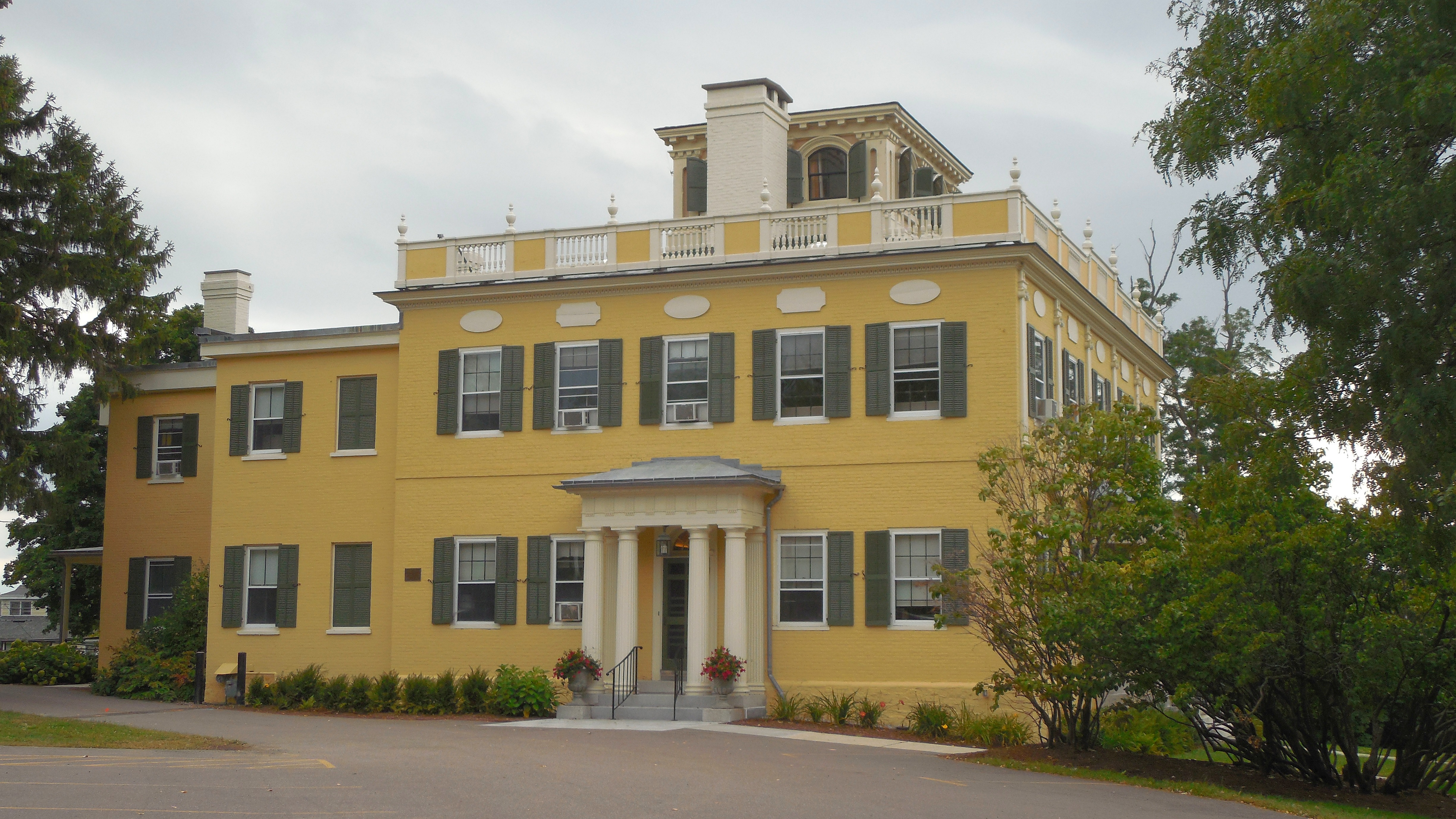
East entrance of Grasse Mount viewed from Summit Street in Burlington, VT

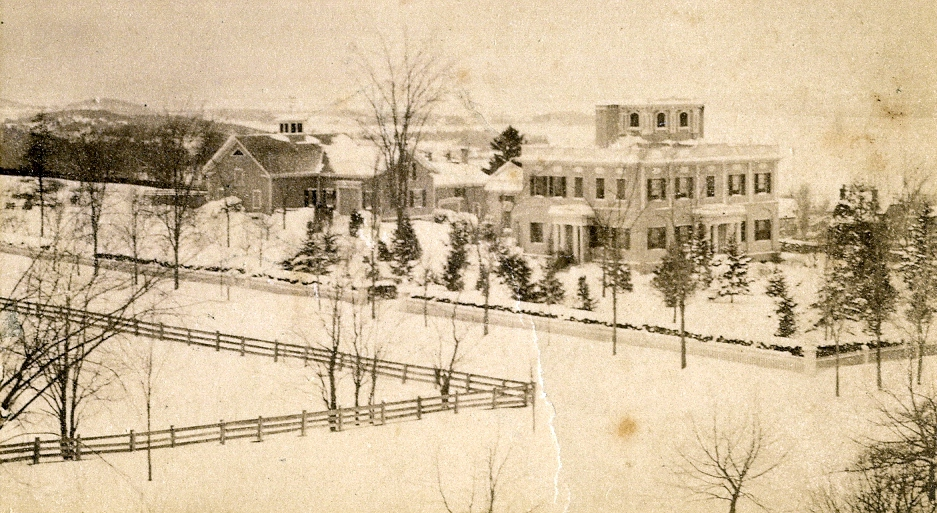
Grasse Mount viewed from the northeast during the 1800s (possibly taken during the Marvin period, note the pre-existing structure in place of the ell at the rear of the building). The white fence was removed in 1923 after it was determined too expensive to repair.

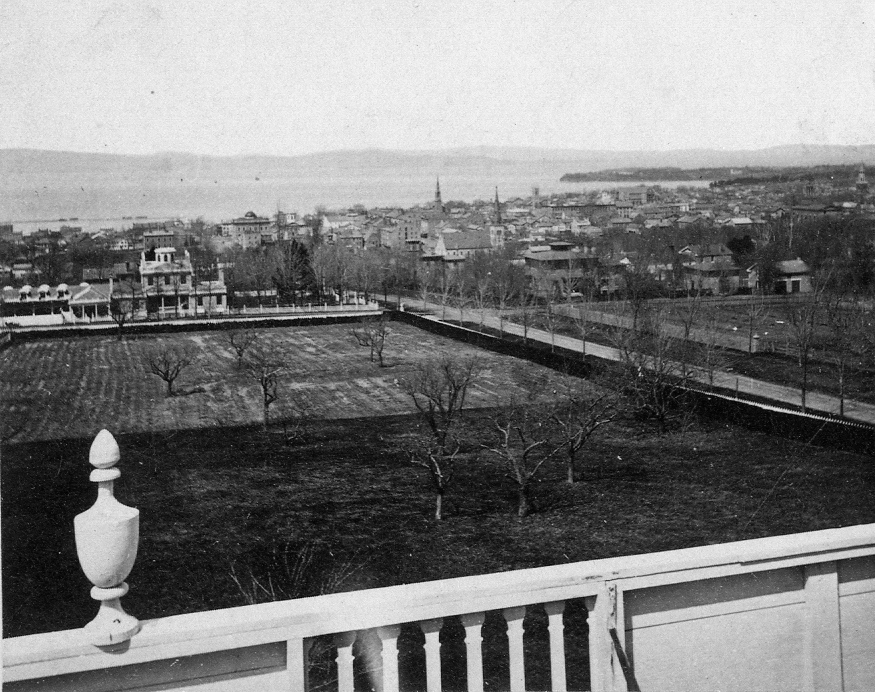
Historic northwestern view from the balustrade of Grasse Mount's orchards and the Burlington skyline (circa 1866-1892).

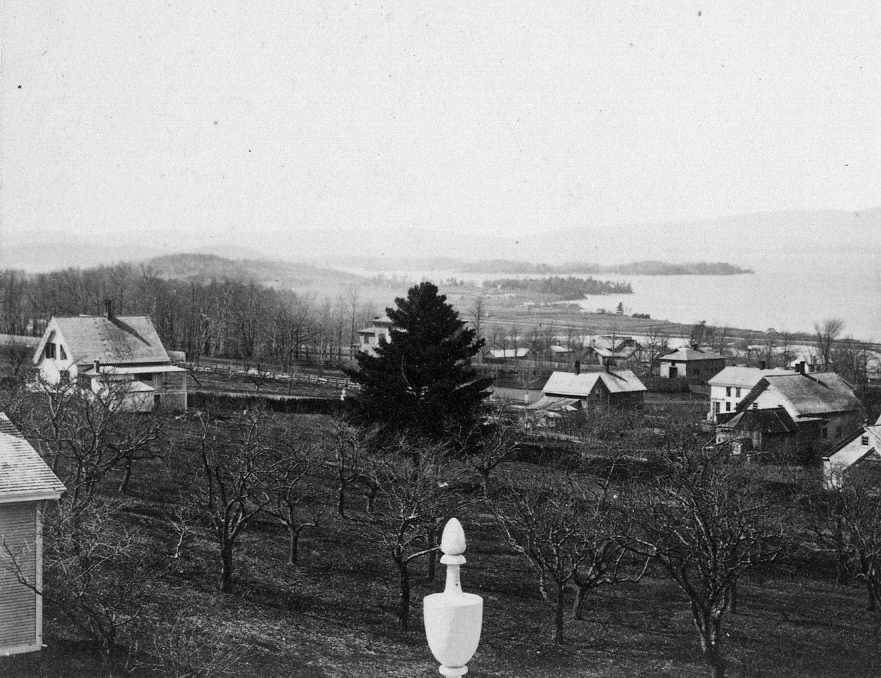
Historic southwestern view of Burlington from the balustrade (circa 1866-1892).

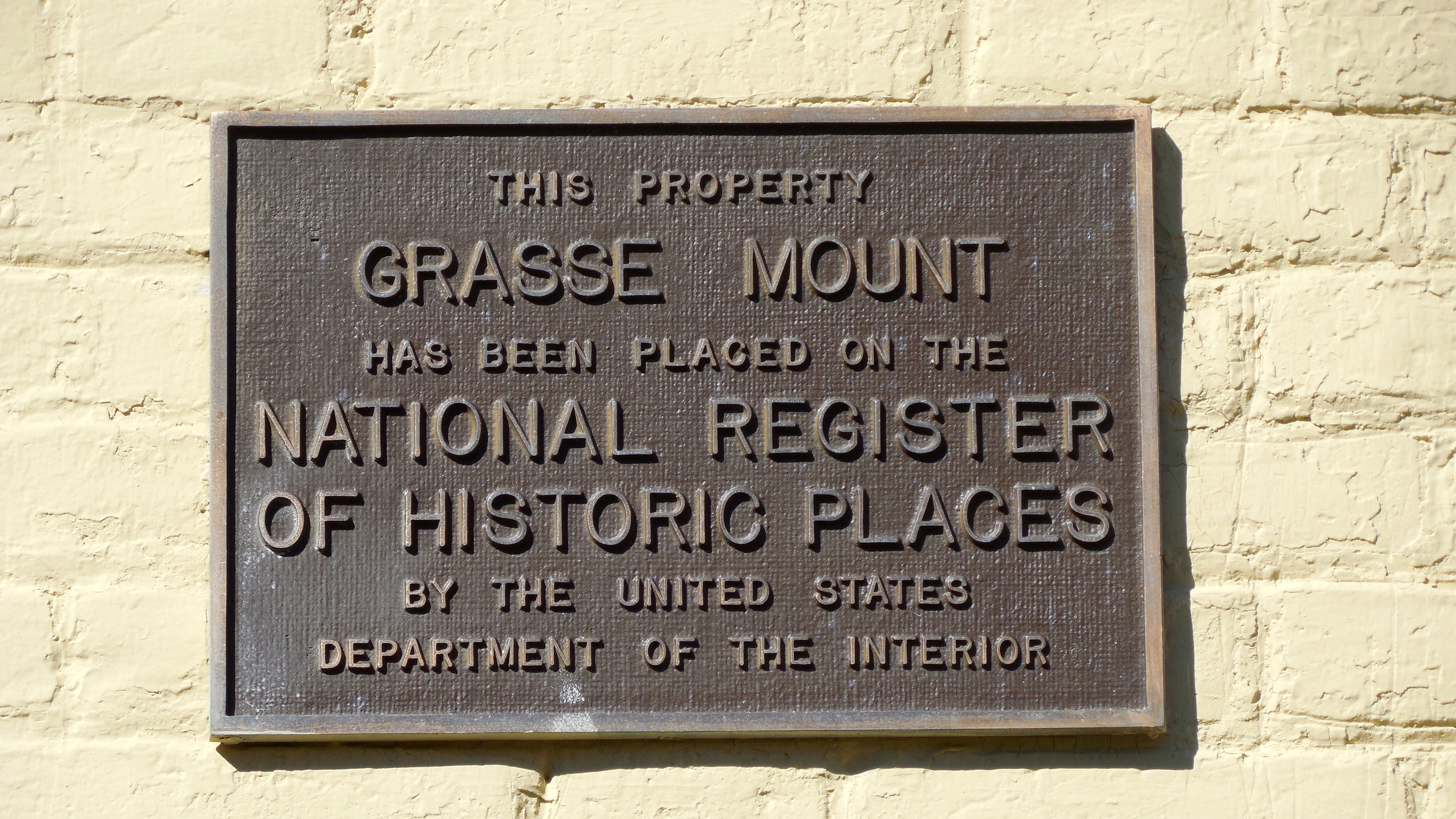
NRHP plaque affixed to the Grasse Mount building

== See also ==
- National Register of Historic Places listings in Chittenden County, Vermont
