= Dudley H. Davis Center =

Student center in the United States

Coordinates: 44.475840°N 73.196439°W

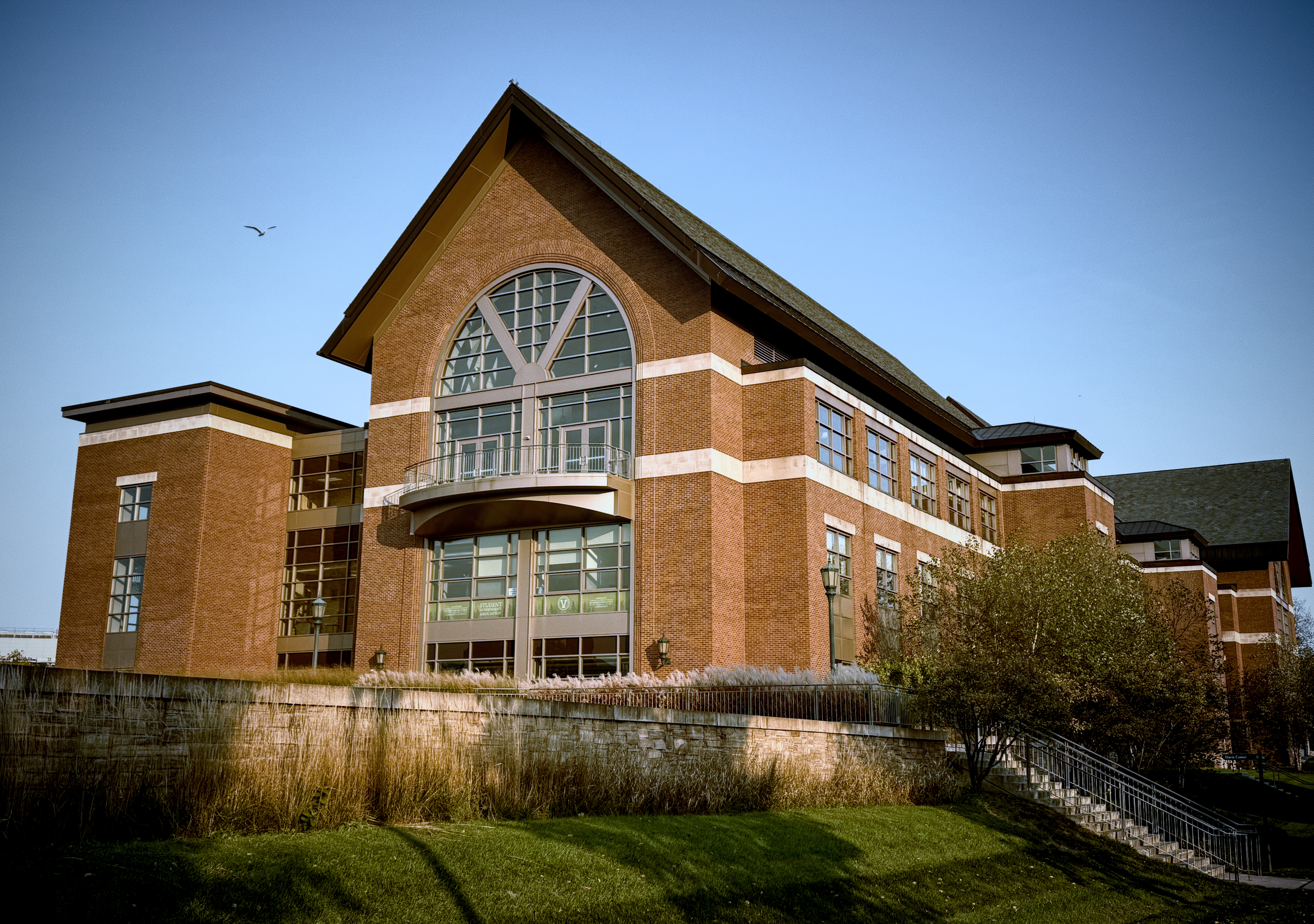
- Eastward view of the Davis Center

General information
- Address: 590 Main Street
- Town or city: Burlington, Vermont
- Country: United States
- Cost: $61 million
- Owner: University of Vermont

Website
- https://www.uvm.edu/daviscenter

The Dudley H. Davis Center (also known as the Davis Center) is the student center at the University of Vermont. It was the first student center in the United States to receive a U.S. Green Building Council Leadership in Energy and Environmental Design (LEED) Gold certification. The building is a four-story structure with a floor area between 186,000 and 202,954 ft^{2}.

Completed in 2007, the Davis Center replaced the Billings Memorial Library as the university's main student center.
