= J. J. R. Randall =

Vermont architect and politician

Jean Jacques Rousseau Randall
- Born: 1828; Braintree, Vermont
- Died: September 4, 1891 (aged 62–63); West Windsor, Vermont
- Occupation: Architect

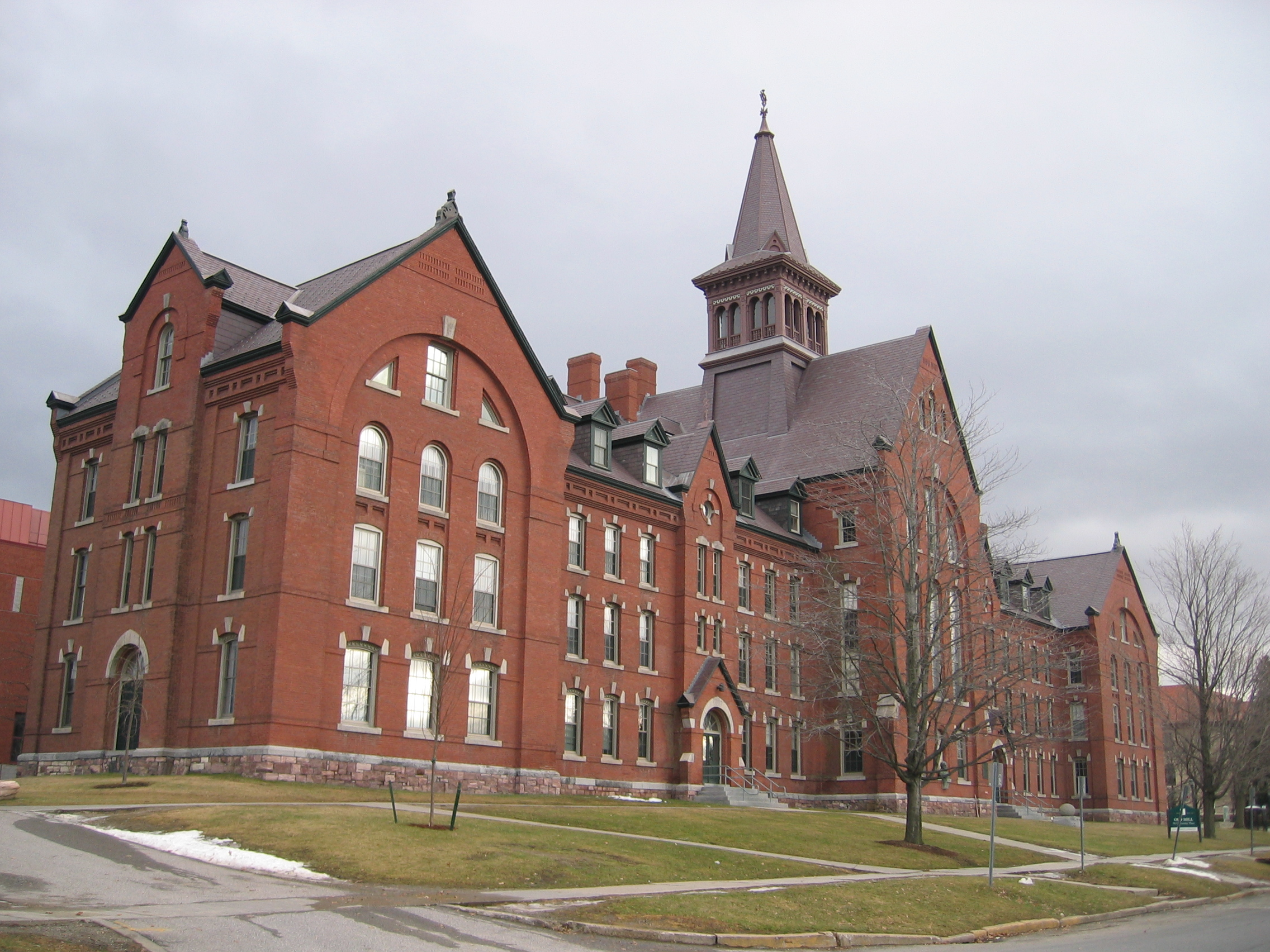
Old Mill, University of Vermont, Burlington, Vermont, 1881.

Jean Jacques Rousseau Randall, usually known as J. J. R. Randall, was an architect, civil engineer and politician from Rutland, Vermont. He was one of the first professional architects to practice in the state, after Ammi B. Young (1830-1838) and his brother, Gurdon P. Randall (1845-1850).

== Life and career ==
J. J. R. Randall was born in Braintree, Vermont in 1828 to Gurdon and Laura Scott Randall, natives of Litchfield, Connecticut. His siblings included Francis V. Randall, Union Army officer of the American Civil War.

Randall initially worked with his brother, Gurdon P. Randall, in his office in Rutland. When his brother relocated to Syracuse, New York in 1850, he succeeded to the practice. He would continue in this business for much of his life. In 1864 his practice suffered a major setback when the building in which he kept his office was destroyed in a fire.

In 1869 Randall became associated with Kellogg, Clarke & Company, iron bridge manufacturers of Phoenixville, Pennsylvania. He and another new partner, James E. Bagley, established a branch for that firm at Springfield, Massachusetts. The following year he severed his connection with that firm and returned to Rutland. In 1877 the Imperial government of Russia approached him with an offer of employment to design a system of railroad bridges in the empire, though it is not clear if he accepted.

He was a member of Rutland's board of school trustees for many years. Randall was active in Democratic politics, and in 1876 he was a candidate for the United States Congress. When Grover Cleveland was elected president in 1885, he appointed Randall national bank examiner for Vermont. He held this position until suffering paralysis in 1887. He died in West Randolph, Vermont on September 4, 1891.

== Personal life ==
Randall married Elizabeth C. Bailey of Rutland in 1859, who died in 1865. In 1874 he married Harriet Elizabeth Forbush of Montpelier, who survived him.

== Legacy ==
Randall was responsible for the design of at least one building that is listed on the United States National Register of Historic Places, and others which contribute to listed historic districts.

== Architectural works ==
Year	Building	Address	City	State	Notes	Image	Reference
1854	Landon Block	51 Merchants Row	Rutland	Vermont	A contributing property to the Rutland Downtown Historic District, listed on the NRHP in 1980.		
1856	"Clementwood" for Charles Clement	Clement Rd	Rutland	Vermont	Attributed. Listed on the NRHP in 1980.		
1857	United States Post Office and Courthouse	10 Court St	Rutland	Vermont	Randall was superintending architect for Supervising Architect for the U. S. Treasury, Ammi B. Young. Presently the Rutland Free Library.		
1861	Rutland Savings Bank Building	71-75 Merchants Row	Rutland	Vermont			
1867	Academy Building	Middlebury College	Middlebury	Vermont	Now known as Alexander Twilight Hall.		
1867	Building	110 Merchants Row	Rutland	Vermont	Attributed. A contributing property to the Rutland Downtown Historic District, listed on the NRHP in 1980.		
1868	Christ Episcopal Church	64 State St	Montpelier	Vermont	A contributing property to the Montpelier Historic District, listed on the NRHP in 1978.		
1869	Rutland County Courthouse	83 Center St	Rutland	Vermont	A contributing property to the Rutland Courthouse Historic District, listed on the NRHP in 1976.		
1870	Vermont Mutual Fire Insurance Company Building	110 State St	Montpelier	Vermont	A contributing property to the Montpelier Historic District, listed on the NRHP in 1978. Has been a state office building since 1953.		
1871	First Baptist Church of Rutland	81 Center St	Rutland	Vermont	A contributing property to the Rutland Courthouse Historic District, listed on the NRHP in 1976.		
1874	Rutland Town Hall	52 Washington St	Rutland	Vermont	Burned.		
1878	Howe Scale Works	1 Scale Ave	Rutland	Vermont	Now known as the Howe Center.		
1881	College Building (Old Mill)	University of Vermont	Burlington	Vermont	A complete rebuilding of the University's 1825 main building. A contributing property to the University Green Historic District, listed on the NRHP in 1975.		
1881	Ripley Opera House	67 Merchants Row	Rutland	Vermont	A contributing property to the Rutland Downtown Historic District, listed on the NRHP in 1980.		
1882	Crescent Valley House	141 School	Pawlet	Vermont	Demolished.		
1884	Richardson Block	36 Center St	Rutland	Vermont	A contributing property to the Rutland Downtown Historic District, listed on the NRHP in 1980.		
