= Granville, Vermont =

- Town
- Moss Glen Falls in Granville

- Location in Addison County and the state of Vermont
- Coordinates: 43°59′54″N 72°49′34″W
- Country: United States
- State: Vermont
- County: Addison
- Communities: Granville; East Granville; Lower Granville

Area
  - Total: 51.5 sq mi (133.4 km^{2})
  - Land: 51.4 sq mi (133.2 km^{2})
  - Water: 0.12 sq mi (0.3 km^{2})
- Elevation: 1,716 ft (523 m)

Population (2020)
  - Total: 301
  - Density: 6.0/sq mi (2.3/km^{2})
- Time zone: UTC−05:00 (Eastern (EST))
  - Summer (DST): UTC−04:00 (EDT)
- ZIP Codes: 05747 (Granville); 05669 (Roxbury)
- Area code: 802
- FIPS code: 50-29575
- GNIS feature ID: 1462108
- Website: www.granvillevermont.org

Granville is a town in Addison County, Vermont, United States. The population was 301 at the 2020 census. The town was originally called Kingston but was renamed in 1833.

Granville was one of thirteen Vermont towns isolated by flooding caused by Hurricane Irene in 2011.

== Geography ==
Granville is located in the eastern corner of Addison County. The historic village center lies a mile north of the Town Hall and Town Clerk complex in Lower Granville. The Braintree Ridge rises to the east, and the main crest of the Green Mountains rises to the west. Vermont Route 100 runs north-south through the town. To the north, it passes through the Granville Gulf, the headlands of the south flowing White River and the north flowing Mad River. Warren borders Granville to the north, and Hancock to the south. The eastern portion of town, including the village of East Granville, is notable in that there is no direct road connection from there to either the main settlement of Granville, or anywhere else in Addison County. Vermont Route 12A runs north-south through this portion of town and connects to Roxbury (in Washington County, to the north) and Braintree (in Orange County, to the south). The Long Trail passes briefly through the western part of the town, crossing the summit of Little Hans Peak (3,348 ft or 1,020 m).

According to the United States Census Bureau, the town has a total area of 51.5 square miles (133.4 km^{2}), of which 51.4 square miles (133.2 km^{2}) is land and 0.12 square miles (0.3 km^{2}), or 0.19%, is water.

== Demographics ==
Historical population
Census	Pop.	Note	%±
1790	101		—
1800	185		83.2%
1810	324		75.1%
1820	328		1.2%
1830	403		22.9%
1840	545		35.2%
1850	603		10.6%
1860	720		19.4%
1870	726		0.8%
1880	830		14.3%
1890	637		−23.3%
1900	544		−14.6%
1910	464		−14.7%
1920	393		−15.3%
1930	280		−28.8%
1940	247		−11.8%
1950	213		−13.8%
1960	215		0.9%
1970	255		18.6%
1980	288		12.9%
1990	309		7.3%
2000	303		−1.9%
2010	298		−1.7%
2020	301		1.0%
U.S. Decennial Census

As of the census of 2000, there were 303 people, 127 households, and 81 families residing in the town. The population density was 5.8 people per square mile (2.2/km^{2}). There were 218 housing units at an average density of 4.2 per square mile (1.6/km^{2}). The racial makeup of the town was 97.36% White, 0.33% African American, 1.32% Native American, 0.33% Pacific Islander, and 0.66% from two or more races. Hispanic or Latino of any race were 0.99% of the population.

There were 127 households, out of which 33.1% had children under the age of 18 living with them, 46.5% were married couples living together, 11.8% had a female householder with no husband present, and 36.2% were non-families. 28.3% of all households were made up of individuals, and 4.7% had someone living alone who was 65 years of age or older. The average household size was 2.39 and the average family size was 2.83.

In the town, the age distribution of the population shows 24.4% under the age of 18, 5.9% from 18 to 24, 34.7% from 25 to 44, 23.4% from 45 to 64, and 11.6% who were 65 years of age or older. The median age was 38 years. For every 100 females, there were 100.7 males. For every 100 females age 18 and over, there were 106.3 males.

The median income for a household in the town was $32,679, and the median income for a family was $31,750. Males had a median income of $25,227 versus $25,179 for females. The per capita income for the town was $14,453. About 8.7% of families and 11.5% of the population were below the poverty line, including 24.1% of those under the age of eighteen and none of those 65 or over.

== Education ==
Granville residents in grades Pre-K-grade 6 attend school in surrounding communities of their choice and grades 7–12 attend Harwood Union High School in South Duxbury, Whitcomb Junior/Senior High School in Bethel or Rochester High School in Rochester.
