= Assembly hall =

Public meeting space

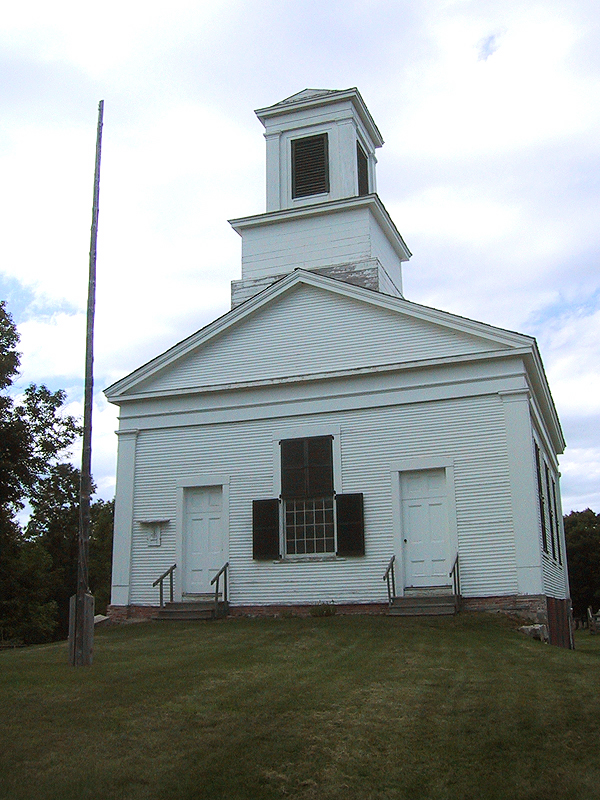
A meeting hall in Braintree, Vermont, USA.

An assembly hall is a hall to hold public meetings or meetings of an organization such as a school, church, or deliberative assembly. An example of the last case is the Assembly Hall (Washington, Mississippi) where the general assembly of the state of Mississippi was held. Some Christian denominations call their meeting places or places of worship assembly halls. Elders and ministers of Presbyterian churches gather in assembly halls for their general assemblies, such as in the General Assembly Hall of the Church of Scotland.

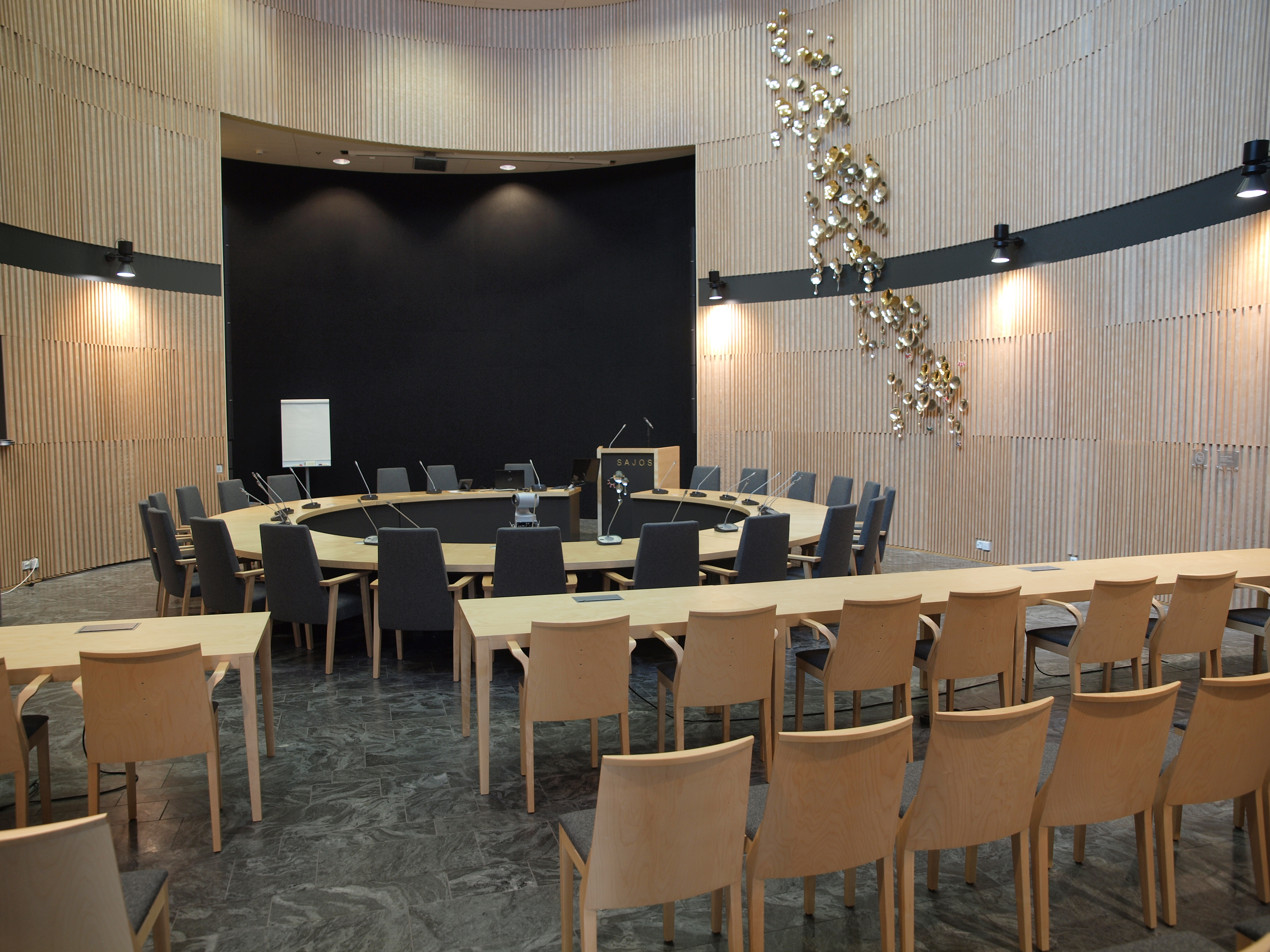
Assembly hall of the Sámi Parliament

== College and university campuses ==
On the campuses of colleges and universities in the United States, assembly halls are sometimes found in multipurpose athletic buildings, where they share other uses, including as basketball courts. Examples are Assembly Hall (Bloomington) and (formerly) Assembly Hall (Champaign).

== See also ==
- Conference hall
- Meeting house
- Assembly rooms
- Wedding reception
- Church hall
- Village hall
