= Ed Pincus =

American filmmaker and photographer

Edward Ralph Pincus (July 6, 1938 – November 5, 2013) studied philosophy and photography at Harvard, and began filmmaking in 1964, developing a direct cinema approach to social and political problems. He has producer-director-director of photography credits on eight of his films and has been cinematographer on more than a dozen additional films. Pincus also authored Guide to Filmmaking (1968) and co-authored The Filmmaker's Handbook (1984 & 1999). He was born in Brooklyn, New York.

Pincus started and developed the Massachusetts Institute of Technology Film Section. He has received a Guggenheim Fellowship (1972) and several National Endowment for the Arts grants. He was Visiting Filmmaker at Minneapolis College of Art and Design and Visiting Filmmaker for three years at Harvard.

After completing his best-known work, Diaries, he moved to Vermont and became a farmer until returning to film in 2007. Ed was known as a leading cut flower Peony producer, who influenced many future generations of farmers and contributed greatly to the Association of Specialty Cut Flower Growers. Pincus died November 5, 2013, of leukemia in Roxbury, Vermont.

== Feature films ==
He filmed his early work on 16 mm film, initially in black & white. He was a pioneer in the use of sync sound color film in natural-light situations. He utilized digital video for his most recent film.

Black Natchez (1965–67), telecast on NET Journal, charts early attempts to organize and register black voters in a Mississippi town. After a local NAACP leader is nearly killed in a car bombing, divisions develop within the black community for control. The National Guard is called out, and a group of Black men attempt to start self-defense organizations. A companion short film, Panola (1965–69), presented a portrait of a local Black man who may be a police informant, describing the ups and downs of his life as he tries to make sense of violence and non-violence during the heyday of the Civil Rights Movement in the South.

One Step Away (1967), commissioned by Public Broadcasting Lab, charts the dissolution of a hippie commune during the Summer of Love in San Francisco.

The Way We See It (1969). Commissioned for a WNET series. Directed by Ed Pincus and David Neuman. Ed describes this as follows, "David Neuman and I were commissioned by Public Television to do a film on a Hispanic film project on the Lower East Side of New York City where disadvantaged kids were given the opportunity to make their own films."

Life and Other Anxieties (1977). Directed by Ed Pincus and Steve Ascher. Ed says of this film, "In 1975, I was invited to 'make any film I wanted as long as it was shot in Minneapolis.' ... Steve Ascher and I teamed up to go to Minneapolis. We wanted to ask strangers what in their lives they would like to have filmed."

Diaries: 1971-1976 (1981), about marriage, career, friends and family during the sexual revolution, was a seminal film in defining the possibilities of what came to be called "personal documentary". Le Monde, in a front-page review, called Diaries "an epic work that redefines an art, forcing us to rethink what we thought we knew about the Cinema."

The Axe in the Attic (2007). Directed by Ed Pincus and Lucia Small. A film about "the diaspora" of the victims of Hurricane Katrina. Ed summarized this as "the distillation of a sixty-day road trip to document what happened to a country displaced, and the role of the filmmakers who bear witness."

One Cut, One Life (2014). Directed by Ed Pincus and Lucia Small. A film about life, love, loss, and art. It premiered at Full Frame Independent Film Festival in April 2014 and received a theatrical release in Summer 2015 in select cities.

== Bibliography ==
- Yardley, William (October 7, 2013). "Ed Pincus, Documentary Filmmaker, Dies at 75". The New York Times.

== Watch ==
- The Axe in the Attic trailer
