= Salisbury Fish Hatchery =

- U.S. National Register of Historic Places
- U.S. Historic district
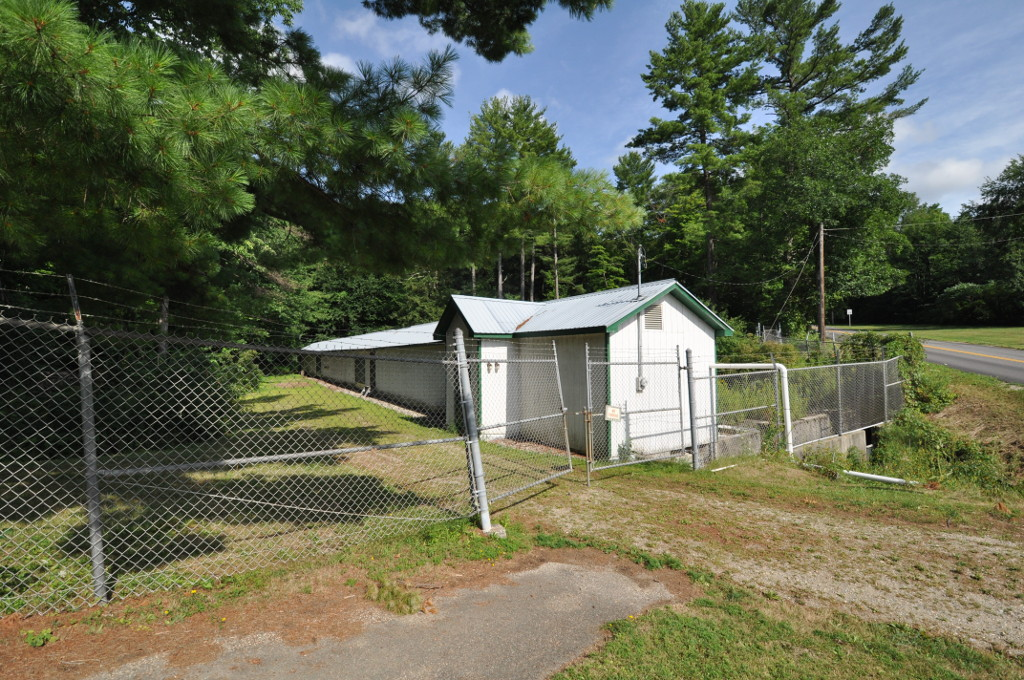
- The 1993 addition to the facilities

- Location within Vermont Location within the United States
- Location: VT 53, SE of jct. with Smead Rd., Salisbury, Vermont
- Coordinates: 43°55′29″N 73°5′47″W
- Area: 68.1 acres (27.6 ha)
- Built: 1931
- Architect: Walker and Walker
- Architectural style: Bungalow/craftsman
- MPS: Fish Culture Resources of Vermont MPS
- NRHP reference No.: 94000176
- Added to NRHP: March 24, 1994

The Salisbury Fish Hatchery is a state-operated fish hatchery on Vermont Route 53 in Salisbury, Vermont. Established in 1931, it produces broodstock trout for distribution to the other hatcheries in the state. Its facilities were listed on the National Register of Historic Places in 1994. The facility may be toured by arrangement, but there is no visitors center.

== Description and history ==
The Salisbury Fish Hatchery is located on both sides of Vermont Route 53, about 0.5 miles (0.80 km) east of its junction with United States Route 7. The facility takes up more than 68 acres (28 ha), although the improved area is relatively modest. Most of the production complex is located on the south side of the highway, with a long and narrow wood-frame structure covering a concrete raceway in which some rearing takes place. The main complex includes a residence and the main hatchery building, which houses a series of troughs in which breeding occurs. The entire complex is fed by a series of freshwater springs and an aquifer, a critical element in the decision to locate the hatchery here. The breeding operating is highly dependent on a continuous supply of fresh water.

The hatchery was established in 1931, and was the first not located near a railroad, previously the method by which the state's other hatcheries delivered their stock to its destinations. Designed by Walker and Walker of Montpelier, the hatchery buildings are more architecturally distinctive than earlier hatcheries, with a number of Craftsman touches. It was established due to a documented decline in the number of fish in the state's waterways, primarily the result of sport fishing. In the 1950s, the facility was expanded by the addition of a feed storage building, and in the 1960s concrete raceways were added. The breeding and rearing facility north of the road houses an unusual light-managed environment to facilitate continuous propagation of fish.

== See also ==
- Roxbury Fish Hatchery
- St. Johnsbury Federal Fish Culture Station
- National Register of Historic Places listings in Addison County, Vermont
