= Paramount Theater (Rutland, Vermont) =

Theater in Rutland, Vermont, United States

Paramount Theatre
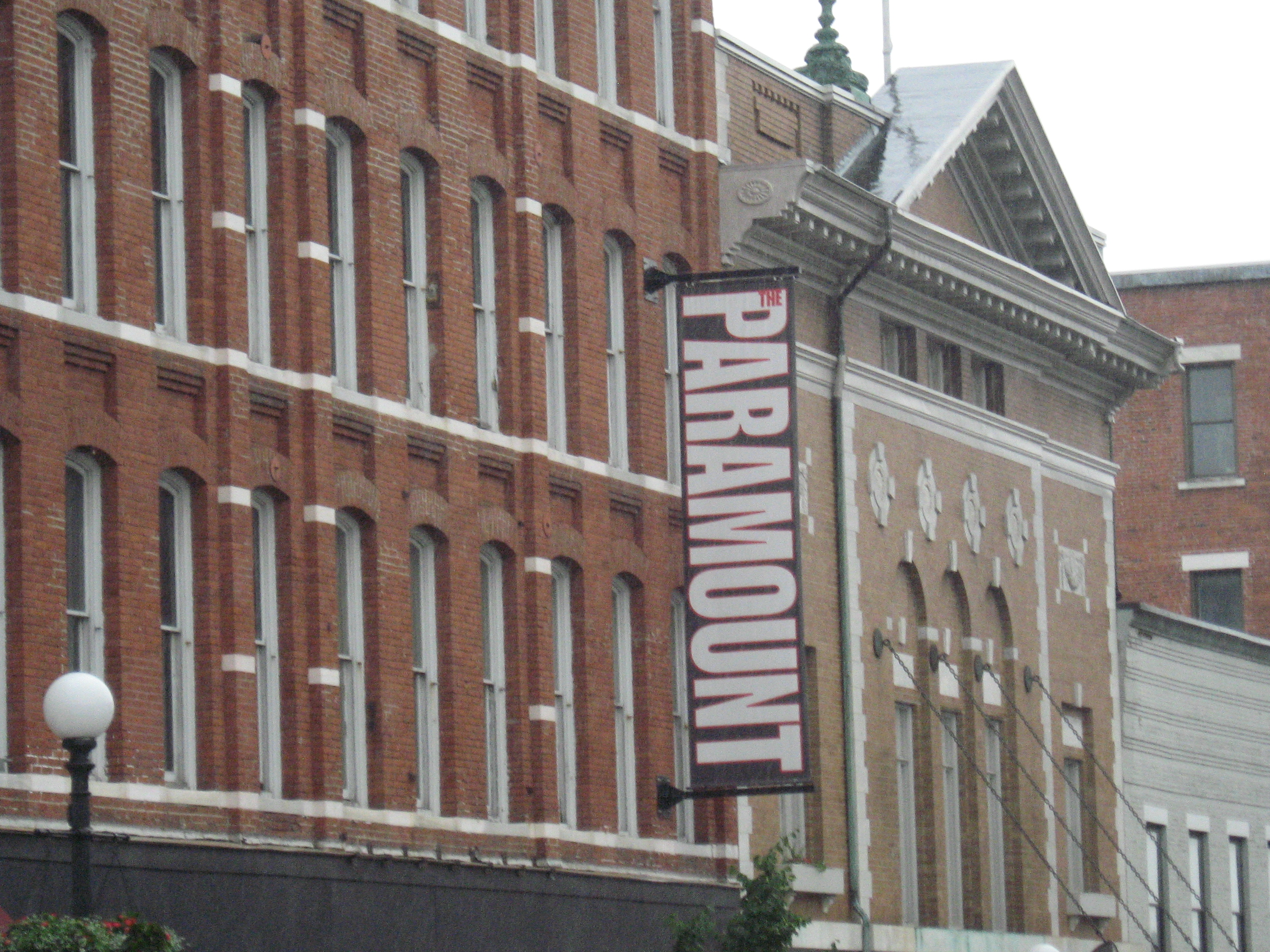
- Interactive map of Paramount Theatre
- Location: 30 Center Street; Rutland, Vermont
- Owner: George T. Chaffee

Construction
- Built: 1913
- Paramount Theater
- U.S. Historic district – Contributing property
- Location within Vermont Location within the United States
- Coordinates: 43°36′23.9″N 72°58′43.4″W
- Architectural style: Colonial Revival
- Part of: Rutland Downtown Historic District (ID80000387)
- Designated CP: August 22, 1980

The Paramount Theatre, also known as The Playhouse, is a historic performance theatre located in Rutland, Vermont. The theatre hosts many events and performances and is a contributing property to the Rutland Downtown Historic District, which is listed on the National Register of Historic Places.

== History ==
In 1913, George Chaffee built a theatre called the Playhouse. The exterior of the Playhouse had a classical style reflecting the City Beautiful movement of the time, while the interior resembled a Victorian era opera house with lavish decoration. The theatre was renamed The Paramount in 1931, and its entertainment shifted from live performance to movies. The movie theater closed in 1977. In 1999, a local group began restoring the theatre to its historic appearance. The theatre reopened in March 2000 and serves again as a center for artistic, cultural, and educational events.
