= St. Johnsbury Federal Fish Culture Station =

- U.S. National Register of Historic Places
- U.S. Historic district
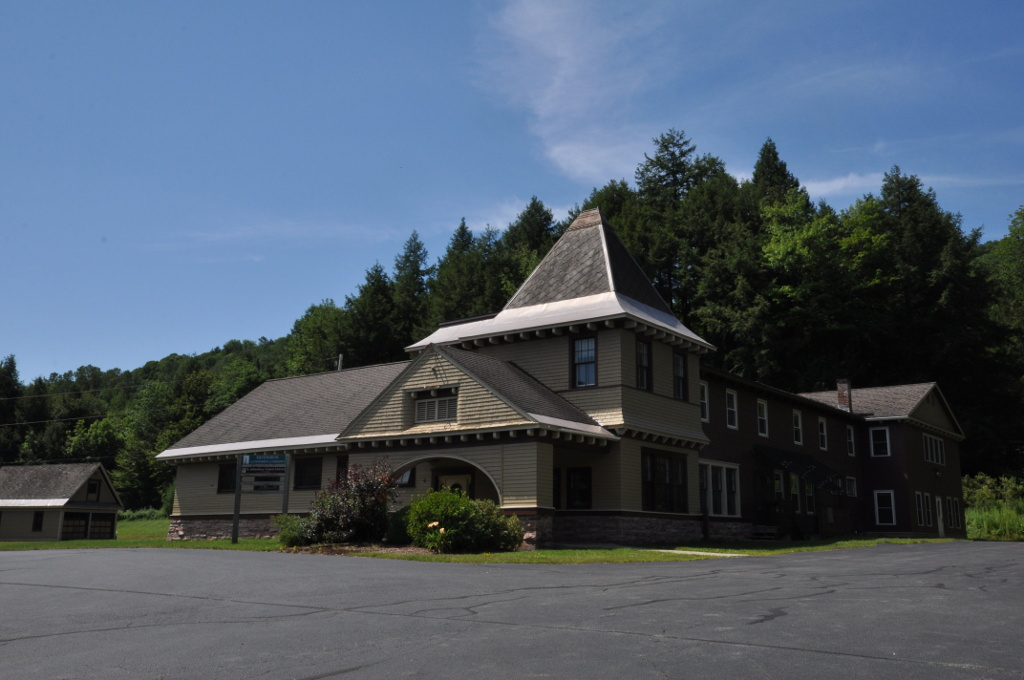

- Location within Vermont Location within the United States
- Location: 374 Emerson Falls Rd., St. Johnsbury, Vermont
- Coordinates: 44°25′59″N 72°2′15″W
- Area: 12.2 acres (4.9 ha)
- Built: 1895
- Architect: von Bayer, Hector; Packard, Lambert
- Architectural style: Shingle Style, Colonial Revival
- MPS: Fish Culture Resources of Vermont MPS
- NRHP reference No.: 05000189
- Added to NRHP: March 18, 2005

The St. Johnsbury Federal Fish Culture Station, also known as the St. Johnsbury Federal Fish Hatchery, was a United States government-funded fish hatchery on Emerson Falls Road in St. Johnsbury, Vermont. The hatchery operated from 1895 to 1960, producing fish stock for headwater tributaries of the Connecticut River and St. Lawrence River in northern New England and New York. The surviving facilities of the hatchery, now adaptively reused for other purposes and in private ownership, were listed on the National Register of Historic Places in 2005.

== History ==
The St. Johnsbury Federal Fish Culture Station was established by an Act of Congress in 1891, to establish and propagate populations of lake trout and salmon in upland tributaries of the Connecticut and St. Lawrence Rivers in northern New England and New York. A site was selected on the west bank of the Sleepers River, a tributary of the Passumpsic River on the outskirts of St. Johnsbury, Vermont, and the facility began production in 1895. The property included water rights on the river, and a freshwater spring that over time proved inadequate to meet the facility's needs.

The facility was nearly closed due to budget cuts in 1934, but remained open due to a cooperative arrangement between federal and state governments. Issues with the high summertime water temperature of the Sleepers River (which affected production of stock requiring lower temperatures) and the inadequacy of its cold-water springs, prompted the decision to close the facility in 1959. It ceased production in 1960, and was sold into private ownership in 1961. Most of its rearing ponds have been filled in, although subsurface plumbing survives, as does its dam, about 0.5 miles (0.80 km) upriver from the remaining buildings. Those buildings underwent restoration in 2001-02 and have been put to other uses.

== Surviving facilities ==
The station facilities are located about 2.5 miles (4.0 km) northwest of downtown St. Johnsbury, and are sandwiched between the Sleepers River and United States Route 2, just north of the latter's junction with Interstate 91. They are at the southern end of Emerson Falls Road.

The main hatchery building is a particularly fine example of Shingle style architecture, designed by Herbert Von Bayer, an architect working for the US Fish and Wildlife Service. It is two stories in height, and has a prominent pyramidal turret at one corner, with an arched porte-cochere adjacent.

Located nearby is the former superintendent's residence, built in 1898 to a design by local architect Lambert Packard. Behind the house stands a c. 1900 carriage barn. The grounds in the area also include filled or partially-filled ponds and raceways for managing waterflow through the facility, as well as subsurface plumbing.

== See also ==
- Roxbury Fish Hatchery
- Salisbury Fish Hatchery
- National Register of Historic Places listings in Caledonia County, Vermont
