= Francis V. Randall =

American military officer and politician

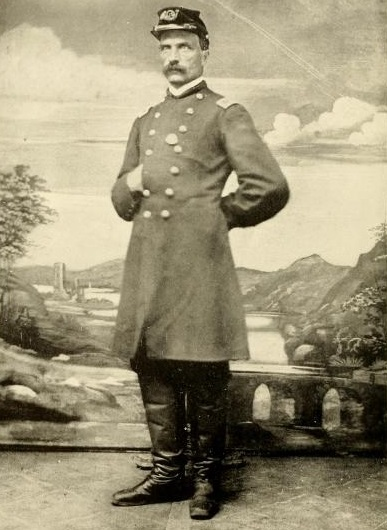
- From 1910's Pictorial History Thirteenth Regiment Vermont Volunteers, War of 1861–1865

Member of the Vermont House of Representatives from Roxbury
- In office 1858–1859
- Preceded by: Edmund Pope
- Succeeded by: Orin W. Orcutt

Postmaster of Northfield, Vermont
- In office 1853–1857
- Preceded by: William Rogers
- Succeeded by: James Currier

Personal details
- Born: February 13, 1824 Braintree, Vermont
- Died: March 1, 1885 (aged 61) Northfield, Vermont
- Resting place: Elmwood Cemetery, Northfield, Vermont
- Party: Democratic (before 1861); Republican (from 1861)
- Spouse(s): Caroline Elizabeth Andrews (m. 1846–1860, div.); Fanny Gertrude Colby (m. 1863–1885, his death)
- Relations: Gurdon P. Randall (brother); J. J. R. Randall (brother)
- Children: 6
- Education: Norwich University (attended)
- Profession: Attorney

Military service
- Allegiance: United States (Union)
- Branch/service: Vermont Militia; Union Army
- Years of service: 1860–1861 (Militia); 1861–1865 (Army)
- Rank: Captain (Militia); Colonel (Army)
- Commands: Capital Guards; Company F, 2nd Vermont Volunteer Infantry Regiment; 13th Vermont Infantry Regiment; 17th Vermont Infantry Regiment; 2nd Vermont Brigade
- Battles/wars: American Civil War

Francis V. Randall (February 13, 1824 – March 1, 1885) was an attorney, farmer, college administrator, and military officer from Vermont. A Union Army veteran of the American Civil War, he was most notable for his service as commander of the 13th Vermont Infantry Regiment during the war and his post-war appointment as vice president of Norwich University.

A native of Braintree, Vermont, Randall was raised and educated in Braintree and Northfield, then studied law with a local attorney. Randall practiced in Northfield, Roxbury, Brookfield, and Montpelier while farming and becoming active in several business ventures. A Democrat, he served in local offices and represented Roxbury in the Vermont House of Representatives.

At the start of the American Civil War, he joined the Union Army and was commissioned captain and commander of Company F, 2nd Vermont Volunteer Infantry Regiment. Randall took part in several battles of the Peninsula campaign in 1861 and 1862, then returned to Vermont to raise the 13th Vermont Infantry Regiment, which he commanded with the rank of colonel. Randall led his regiment during several battles, and played an important role in the Union's success at the Battle of Gettysburg. After the 13th Vermont's enlistments expired, Randall raised the 17th Vermont Infantry Regiment, which he commanded as a colonel. He took part in the battles of the Siege of Petersburg, and remained in the service until the end of the war. Discharged in July 1865, he returned to Vermont, joined the Republican Party, and resumed his law practice and farming and business interests.

In 1883, Randall was appointed vice president of Norwich University. He died in Northfield on March 1, 1885, and was buried at Elmwood Cemetery in Northfield.

== Early life ==
Francis Voltaire Randall was born in Braintree, Vermont on February 13, 1824, a son of Gurdon R. and Laura (Warner) Randall. His siblings included architects Gurdon P. Randall and J. J. R. Randall. Randall was raised and educated first in Braintree, and then in Northfield. He attended Chester Academy in Chester, Vermont and Norwich University.

After deciding on a legal career, he left Norwich without graduating and studied law with Northfield attorney Herman Carpenter. Randall attained admission to the bar in 1847, and began to practice in Northfield. He practiced initially with Albert V. H. Carpenter, and later with Charles Herbert Joyce, who was married to his sister Rouene. In 1848, Randall served as an assistant doorkeeper of the Vermont House of Representatives.

== Start of career ==
Randall practiced law in Northfield until 1854, when he moved to Roxbury, where he farmed while continuing his law practice. In 1851 and 1852, Randall was elected moderator of Northfield's town meeting, and he also served on Northfield's school board. From 1853 to 1857, Randall served as Northfield's postmaster.

A Democrat in politics, in 1857 he appeared to have won the election to represent Roxbury in the Vermont House of Representatives, but an investigating committee determined that he did not meet the residency requirement and did not allow him to claim his seat. Randall did win election to the Vermont House the following year, and served from 1858 to 1859. In 1860, Randall moved to Montpelier, where he continued to expand his law practice.

== Civil War ==
=== 2nd Vermont Infantry ===
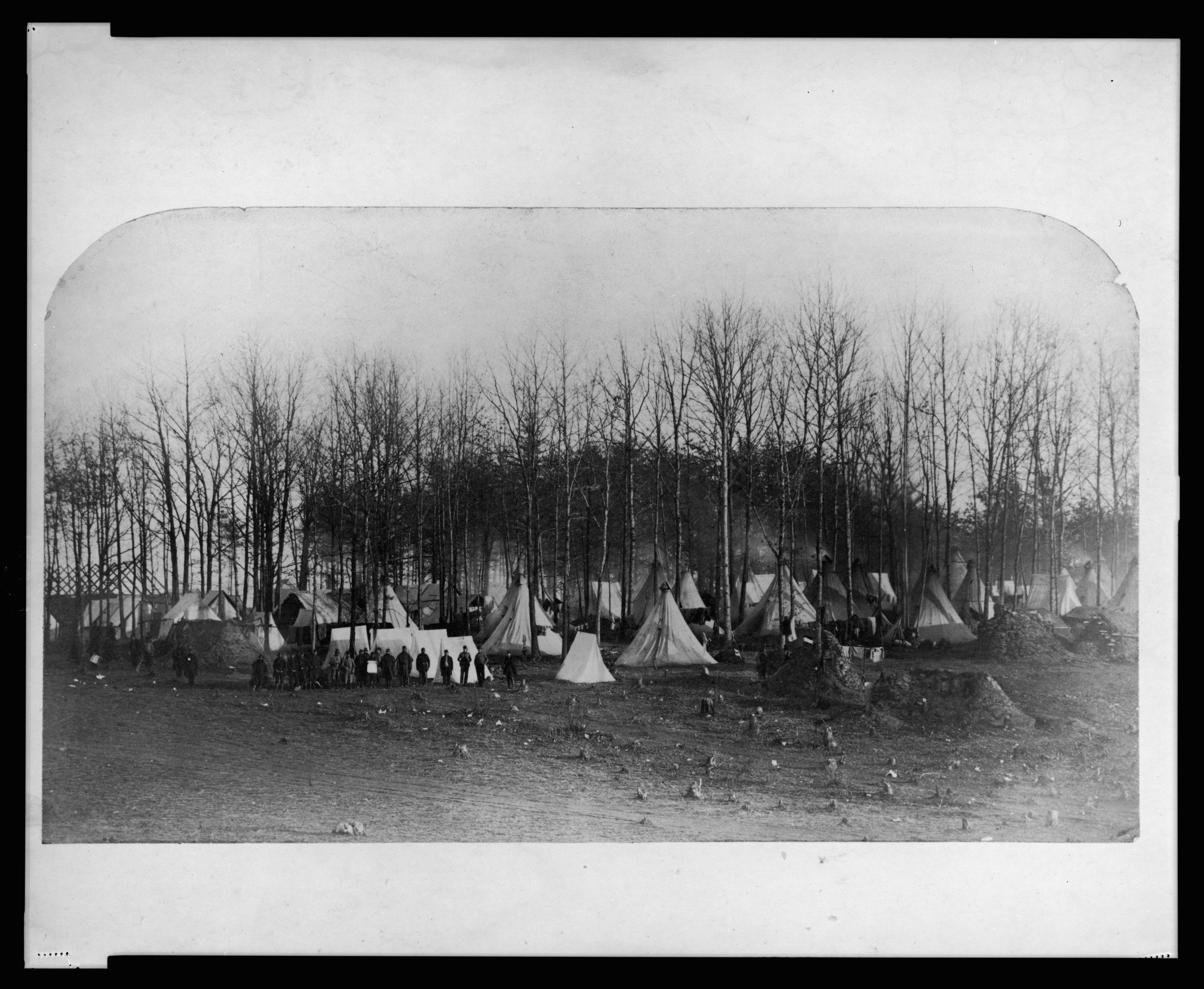
Encampment of the 2nd Vermont Infantry at Camp Griffin, near what is today McLean, Virginia

In 1860, Randall joined the Vermont Militia and was assigned to the staff of the 1st Brigade as judge advocate. In early 1861, he joined a Montpelier militia company, the Capital Guards, which he commanded with the rank of captain. At the start of the American Civil War in 1861, Randall enlisted in the Union Army and received his commission as captain and commander of Company F, 2nd Vermont Volunteer Infantry Regiment. He served from May 1861 to September 1862, and took part in the battles of First Bull Run, Second Bull Run, Lee's Mills, Williamsburg, Golding's Farm, Savage's Station, White Oak Swamp, and Crampton's Gap.

=== 13th Vermont Infantry ===
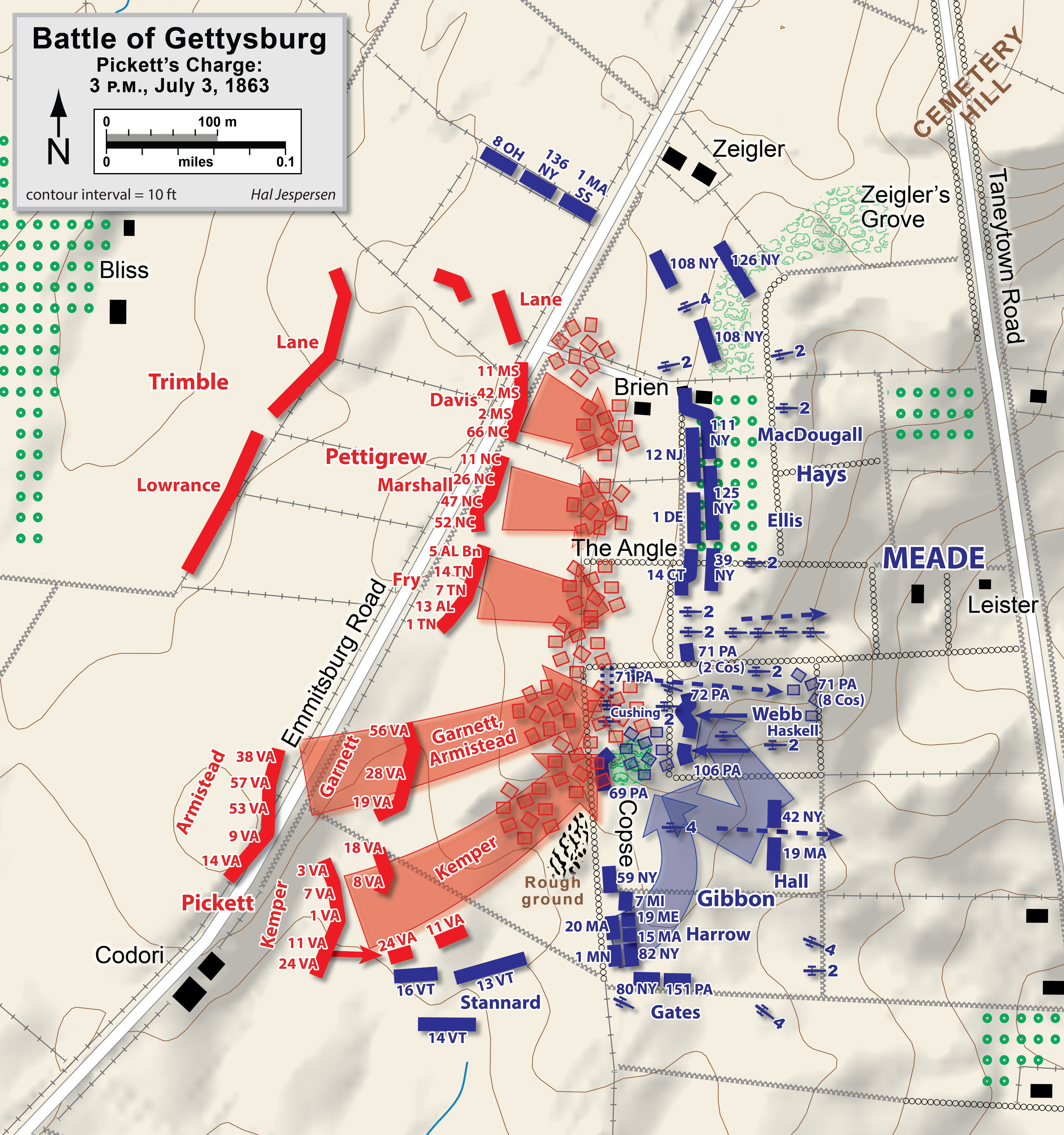
Map depicting Pickett's charge. Randall's location with the 13th Vermont is near the bottom center.

In September 1862, Randall returned to Vermont to assist in raising the 13th Vermont Infantry Regiment, which he was appointed to command with the rank of colonel. Randall led the 13th Vermont throughout late 1862 and 1863, including the July 1863 Battle of Gettysburg. Randall was leading the 13th Vermont as part of the 2nd Vermont Brigade on July 2 when corps commander Winfield Scott Hancock asked Randall if he could recapture a Union artillery battery that had been captured by Confederate troops. Because of the extraordinary danger, Hancock would not order Randall to perform the task, but Randall volunteered.

Confederate troops fired on the soldiers Randall was leading, and he ordered a charge, which surprised the Confederates and caused them to immediately surrender. Randall turned the prisoners over to Hancock and continued on towards the captured cannons. As they neared the Emmitsburg Road, Confederate artillery fired on Randall and his troops, but Randall successfully maneuvered his soldiers and they retook the battery. During they action, they captured three Confederate officers and 80 soldiers. Randall then led his troops, the prisoners, and the recaptured battery back to the Union lines at Seminary Ridge.

On July 3, the 13th Vermont was credited with ending Pickett's Charge by marching forward from the Union's defensive line on Cemetery Ridge to execute a facing maneuver that enabled them to fire directly into the flank of Pickett's troops. After receiving these volleys, the Confederates began to drop their rifles and wave their hands in surrender. Randall gave the order to cease fire, but could not be heard over the noise of the battlefield. He then took the initiative to break through to the front of his lines, and placed his back to the enemy so he could shout while waving his sword and hat at his own troops until his order to stop firing was understood. While still under fire from both sides, Randall moved quickly among the surrendering Confederates and directed them to his line, where they could be collected and moved to safety. After the fighting, a count revealed that his action had resulted in the capture of two hundred and forty three officers and men.

The 13th Vermont's attack on Pickett's troops broke up the Confederate attack and effectively ended the battle. Stannard was wounded during the fighting, and Randall assumed temporary command of the 2nd Vermont Brigade. When draft riots broke out in New York City in mid-July, Randall led the brigade as it took part in the military's response.

=== 17th Vermont Infantry ===
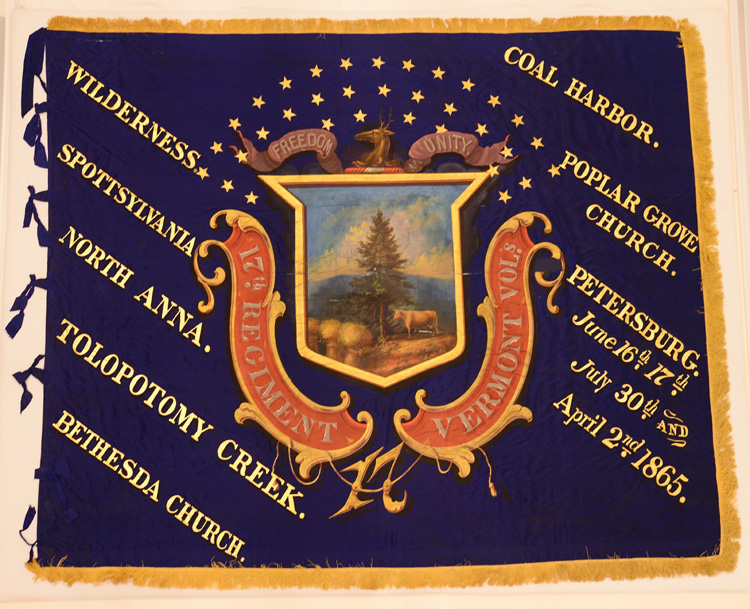
17th Vermont Infantry's regimental colors

In late July 1863, the 13th Vermont completed its term of service and was mustered out. Randall returned to Vermont to organize the 17th Vermont Infantry Regiment, which he was appointed to command. As part of the IX Corps, Randall led the 17th Vermont during its participation in the Battle of the Wilderness and Siege of Petersburg. He remained in the army until the end of the war, and was mustered out in July 1865.

== Later life ==
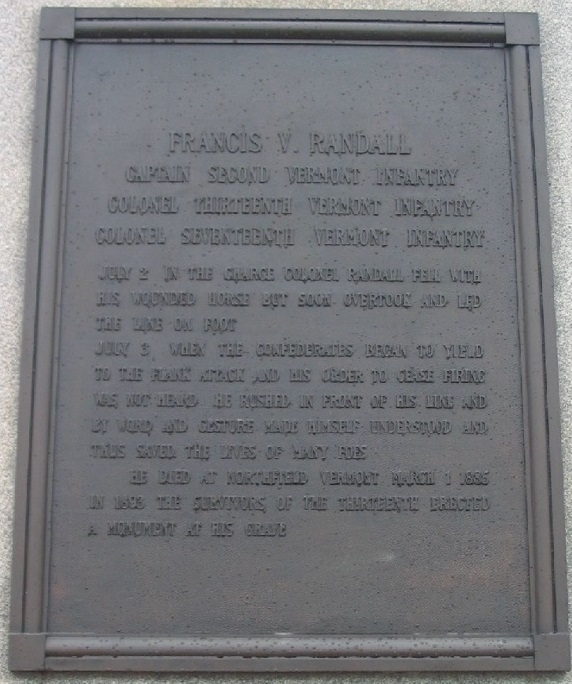
Rear plaque on13th Vermont Infantry's Gettysburg memorial

After leaving the army, Randall practiced law in Montpelier until 1876, when he moved to Brookfield, where he farmed and practiced law. Randall was also involved in several business ventures, including serving as an original incorporator of the Montpelier and Wells River Railroad. In addition, he was the owner of a store in East Montpelier.

Randall became a Republican after the Civil War; in 1870, he was an unsuccessful candidate for the party's nomination to represent Montpelier in the Vermont House of Representatives. In addition, he served in local offices including town auditor. Randall was a sought after orator, and frequently spoke at Memorial Day ceremonies and other events.

In 1883, he was appointed vice president of Norwich University. During that year, he also received the honorary degree of Master of Arts from Norwich University, and was named an honorary member of the Theta Chi fraternity. In 1884, Randall purchased a hotel in Northfield, which he renamed the Randall House, where he lived until his death. Randall was active in the Freemasons, Reunion Society of Vermont Officers, and Grand Army of the Republic.

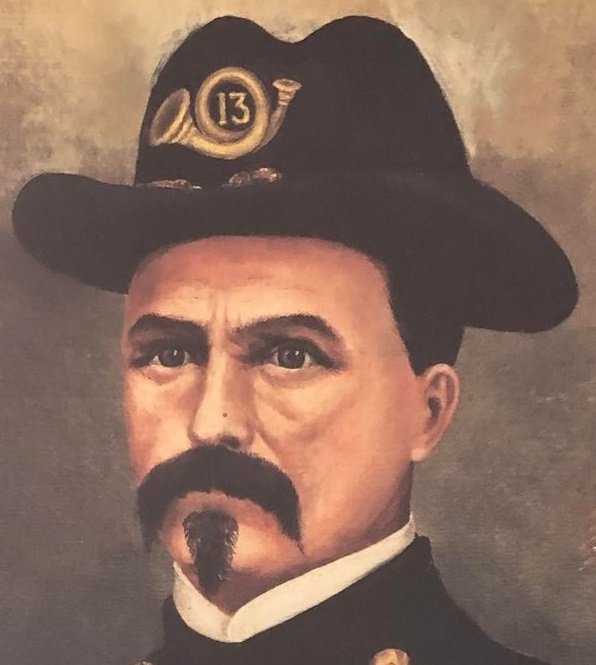
Portrait by Charles Hardin Andrus (1852–1924)

Randall died in Northfield on March 1, 1885. He was buried at Elmwood Cemetery in Northfield. In mid-March, organizers created a new Grand Army of the Republic post in Danville, which was named in Randall's honor. In 1899, the 13th Vermont Regimental Association erected a monument on the Gettysburg battlefield. The bronze plaque on the rear of the memorial commemorates Randall's leadership:

Francis V. Randall, Captain Second Vermont Infantry, Colonel Thirteenth Vermont Infantry, Colonel Seventeenth Vermont Infantry. July 2; In the charge Colonel Randall fell with his wounded horse but soon overtook and led the line on foot. July 3; When the Confederates began to yield to the flank attack and his order to cease firing was not heard he rushed in front of his line and by word and gesture made himself understood and thus saved the lives of many foes. He died at Northfield, Vermont, March 1, 1885. In 1893 the survivors of the Thirteenth erected a monument at his grave.

== Family ==
In July 1846, Randall married Caroline Elizabeth Andrews. They were the parents of three children: Charles Woodbridge (1847–1868); Francis Voltaire (1851–1924); and Zelda Valeria (1854–1855). In 1859, Randall discovered that his wife was having an affair with another man, and they divorced in 1860.

Randall remarried in December 1863. His second wife was Fanny Gertrude Colby, and they were the parents of three children: Philip Sheridan (1865–1960); Gurdon Colby (1867–1868); and Luther Volney (1875–1953).
