= Clementwood =

Historic house in Vermont, United States

- U.S. National Register of Historic Places
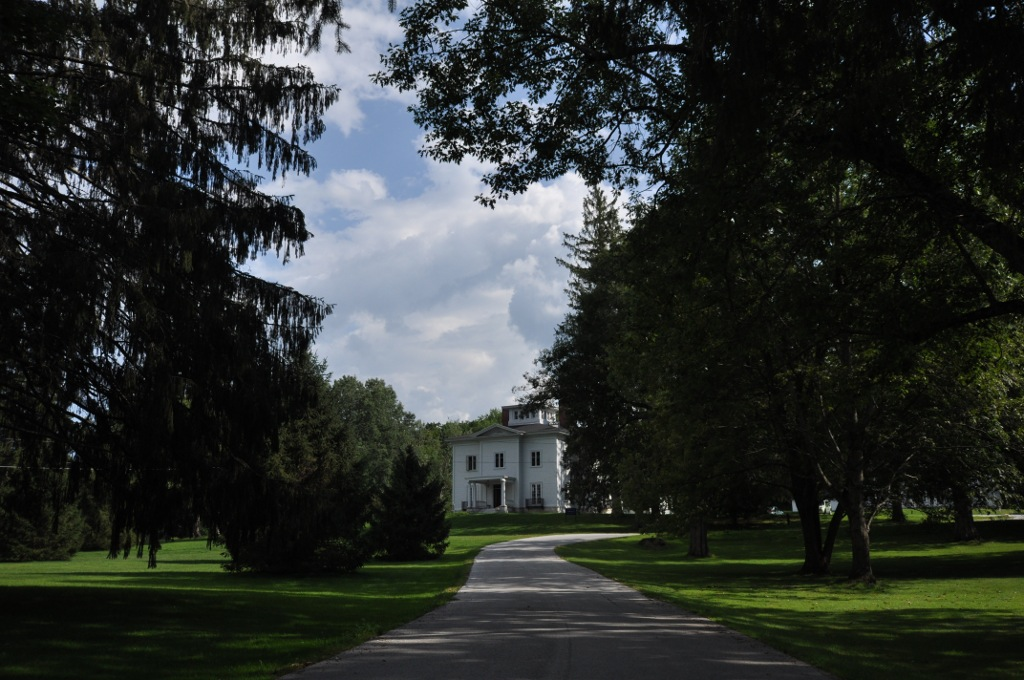

- Location within Vermont Location within the United States
- Location: Clement Rd., Rutland, Vermont
- Coordinates: 43°35′59″N 73°0′25″W
- Area: 21 acres (8.5 ha)
- Built: 1860
- Architect: J. J. R. Randall
- Architectural style: Italian Villa
- NRHP reference No.: 80000338
- Added to NRHP: September 27, 1980

Clementwood is a historic estate in Rutland, Vermont, United States. Clementwood is now a private residence purchased by Rutland, VT attorney Gary Kupferer. It was previously a part of the campus of the College of St. Joseph on the city's west side. The estate was developed in the 1850s by Charles Clement, a leading local businessman whose family fortune was made in the locally prominent marble industry. The house is a notably fine example of Italianate architecture; it currently houses the administrative offices of the college. The estate was listed on National Register of Historic Places in 1980.

== Description and history ==
Clementwood is located on the outskirts of Rutland city, on the south side of Otter Creek, and now forms the western portion of the campus of the College of St. Joseph. The estate encompasses 21 acres (8.5 ha) of landscaped and wooded land, and includes the main house, carriage barn, and two former caretaker's houses. The house is a sophisticated example of Italianate architecture, two stories in height, with a hip roof topped by a belvedere, and set on a marble foundation. Its main facades are three bays wide, with central projecting bays topped by shallow gables. A number of additions and alterations have been made, reflecting the building's long institutional history.

The estate was developed by Charles Clement, whose family owned marble-related businesses in Rutland that benefited and greatly expanded in the 1850s by the arrival of the railroad in the city. The house was probably built around 1856–57, and may have been designed by J. J. R. Randall, a prominent local architect. The estate was named "Clementwood", combining the names of Clement and the maiden name of his wife, Elizabeth Wood. The Clements expanded their business interests into banking and railroads, and Clement's son Percival was politically active, serving as Governor of Vermont 1919–21. The estate was divided after Percival Clement's death in 1927, and this portion was purchased in 1948 to form part of the campus of the short-lived Rutland Junior College. In 1964 it became the campus of the College of St. Joseph. The estate house was used as a library and faculty housing for a number of years, primarily nuns of the Sisters of St. Joseph. In the 2000s, the main house was better integrated into the campus by housing its administrative offices, and serving as an event and function venue.

== See also ==
- National Register of Historic Places listings in Rutland County, Vermont
