= Roxbury, Vermont =

- Town
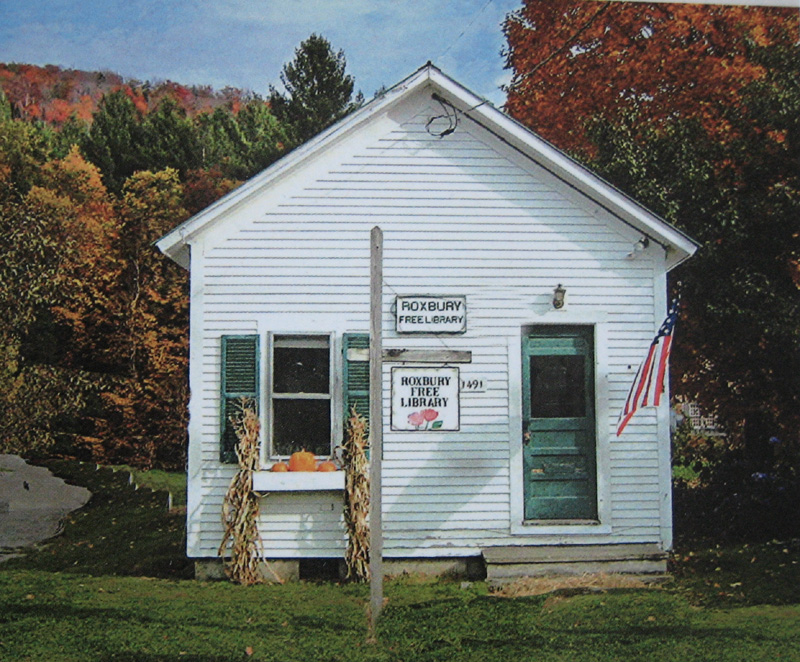
- Roxbury Free Public Library

- Location in Washington County and the state of Vermont
- Coordinates: 44°05′30″N 72°45′07″W
- Country: United States
- State: Vermont
- County: Washington
- Chartered: 1781 (Vermont)
- Communities: Roxbury; East Roxbury; Roxbury Flat

Area
  - Total: 41.8 sq mi (108.3 km^{2})
  - Land: 41.8 sq mi (108.2 km^{2})
  - Water: 0.039 sq mi (0.1 km^{2})
- Elevation: 1,700 ft (520 m)

Population (2020)
  - Total: 678
  - Density: 6.3/sq mi (2.4/km^{2})
- Time zone: UTC-5 (EST)
  - Summer (DST): UTC-4 (EDT)
- ZIP Codes: 05669 (Roxbury); 05060 (Randolph); 05663 (Northfield)
- Area code: 802
- FIPS code: 50-60625
- GNIS feature ID: 1462190
- Website: roxburyvt.gov

Roxbury is a town in Washington County, Vermont, United States, created by Vermont charter on August 6, 1781. The population was 678 at the 2020 census.

== Geography and wildlife ==
According to the United States Census Bureau, the town has a total area of 41.8 square miles (108.3 km^{2}), of which 41.8 square miles (108.2 km^{2}) is land and 0.04 square mile (0.1 km^{2}) (0.10%) is water.

Roxbury is the southernmost town of Washington County; it is bordered by Northfield (to the north), Warren (to the west), Granville (to the south and southwest), Braintree (to the southeast), and Brookfield (to the east). The town is located some 25 miles (40 km) southwest of Montpelier, the state capital. Roxbury is bisected by Vermont Route 12A, which runs through the town in a north-south direction. Roxbury includes the headwaters of the Dog River and White River; the former flows north into the Winooski River, while the latter flows south into Connecticut River. The geographic center of Vermont is located three miles east of Roxbury village.

Roxbury is heavily mountainous and forested, featuring some of the area's most rugged terrain. More than 85% of the land surface area of the town is forested, including 5,500 acres (2,200 ha) of state land and more than 7,000 acres (2,800 ha) of privately owned land that is enrolled in the state's Use Value Program.

More than twenty points within the town have an elevation of more than 2,000 feet (610 m); elevations in the town range from a low of 880 feet (270 m) (along the Third Branch of the White River) to a high of 3,086 feet (941 m) (at the peak of Rice Mountain). Rice Mountain lies in the Northfield range of the Green Mountains along the western boundary of the town.

== History ==
Roxbury was granted by the Vermont General Assembly in 1781; its name is likely derived from Roxbury, Massachusetts, which later became part of Boston. The town was chartered on August 6, 1781, to Benjamin Edwards and 64 other people, although just 20 of these ever lived in the town. Actual European settlement began in 1789, and the first town meeting was held in 1797.

The town grew steadily in the first six decades of the 19th century, growing from 113 residents in 1800 to a peak of 1,060 residents in 1860, on the eve of the American Civil War. In the war, 94 Roxbury men served; 29 perished. The town's population dropped in the 20th century after World War II, especially after the town's marble quarries (which opened in 1857) were closed in 1957; the city's population reached a low point in 1970, with just 354 residents. Subsequently, however, the town has made a rebound, with the population rising to 691 in 2010.

== Economy ==
Historically, Roxbury's economy was highly dependent upon resource extraction; major economic activities included agriculture, logging, fishing, and quarrying. Verde Antique marble quarrying and talc mining were historically significant in Roxbury; today, one commercial sand and gravel extraction operation is located in the town. Roxbury's marble quarries opened in 1857 and closed in 1957.

In modern times, 80% of Roxbury workers are employed outside the town. From the 1970s onward, many Roxbury residents have commuted to Montpelier and Barre for work.

The Central Vermont Public Service Corporation and the Washington Electric Co-op are electric utilities for the town, although some residents live off-the-grid using alternative energy.

== Government, law enforcement, and fire protection ==
Town voters elect three members of the select board. The members of the select board have three-year terms and are responsible for carrying out a variety of duties, including "warning" (posting notice of) town meetings; enacting and enforcing town ordinances; proposing a town budget; overseeing town employees; authorizing expenditures; and appointing seven members of the town Planning Commission. The select board members, together with the local justices of the peace, make up the Board of Civil Authority. The select board is assisted in the administration of town affairs by a town clerk, an assistant town clerk, and a town treasurer; the latter two officials are part-time. Other elected town officials include three listers, who are responsible for property tax assessments and other duties; three auditors, who prepare an annual Town Report; and three school directors who oversee public education.

Roxbury does not have a police department; the Vermont State Police enforces laws as needed. Roxbury's town constable lacks law enforcement authority; rather, the constable "makes occasional checks on seasonal homes and hunting camps, assists the State Police in case of accidents and other emergencies, serves subpoenas and restraining orders, and receives occasional calls regarding nuisance situations."

Roxbury has a volunteer fire department, which as of 2014 consisted of ten active volunteers.

== Points of interest ==
- The Roxbury State Fish Hatchery, the state's first fish hatchery, was built in 1891. The hatchery continued to operate—and to draw up to 2,800 visitors each summer—until it suffered catastrophic damage from Hurricane Irene in August 2011. The state is rebuilding the hatchery.
- Historic cemeteries in the town are several cemeteries include First Settlers, Orcutt, West Hill, Village, East Roxbury and Roxbury Flats.
- The local historical society "is housed in a small building that was for many years the Town Clerk's Office"; its collection includes a variety of historic items.
- Camp Windridge at Teela Wooket is a privately owned tennis, soccer, and horseback riding camp. The camp was originally established by Claude and Florence Roys in 1913 and initially operated as "an exclusive girls' camp"; the camp was sold in 1989.
- The Roxbury Free Library, which has about 5,000 volumes.

Historical population
Census	Pop.	Note	%±
1790	14		—
1800	113		707.1%
1810	361		219.5%
1820	512		41.8%
1830	737		43.9%
1840	784		6.4%
1850	967		23.3%
1860	1,060		9.6%
1870	916		−13.6%
1880	938		2.4%
1890	768		−18.1%
1900	712		−7.3%
1910	618		−13.2%
1920	609		−1.5%
1930	594		−2.5%
1940	554		−6.7%
1950	465		−16.1%
1960	364		−21.7%
1970	354		−2.7%
1980	452		27.7%
1990	575		27.2%
2000	576		0.2%
2010	691		20.0%
2020	678		−1.9%
U.S. Decennial Census

== Demographics ==
As of the census of 2000, there were 576 people, 227 households, and 163 families residing in the town. The population density was 13.8 people per square mile (5.3/km^{2}). There were 362 housing units at an average density of 8.7 per square mile (3.3/km^{2}). The racial makeup of the town was 94.10% White, 0.52% African American, 1.04% Native American, 0.17% from other races, and 4.17% from two or more races. Hispanic or Latino of any race were 1.22% of the population.

There were 227 households, out of which 30.0% had children under the age of 18 living with them, 63.0% were married couples living together, 5.7% had a female householder with no husband present, and 27.8% were non-families. 18.9% of all households were made up of individuals, and 7.0% had someone living alone who was 65 years of age or older. The average household size was 2.54 and the average family size was 2.93.

In the town, the population was spread out, with 24.0% under the age of 18, 6.1% from 18 to 24, 29.5% from 25 to 44, 31.1% from 45 to 64, and 9.4% who were 65 years of age or older. The median age was 40 years. For every 100 females, there were 101.4 males. For every 100 females age 18 and over, there were 99.1 males.

The median income for a household in the town was $43,438, and the median income for a family was $44,000. Males had a median income of $26,833 versus $25,750 for females. The per capita income for the town was $16,880. About 10.1% of families and 9.1% of the population were below the poverty line, including 5.9% of those under age 18 and 12.8% of those age 65 or over.

== Education ==
Montpelier-Roxbury Supervisory Union is the school district covering the town. The district's comprehensive high school is Montpelier High School in Montpelier.

Formerly the town had its own school, Roxbury Village School. The town joined the Montpelier-Roxbury school district in 2018. In 2024, the district closed the Roxbury Village School.

== Notable people ==
- Gideon Hixon, member of the Wisconsin State Legislature, was born in Roxbury
- Ed Pincus, documentary filmmaker, had a home in Roxbury and died there
- Francis V. Randall, Union Army officer in the American Civil War
- Zed S. Stanton, Vermont lieutenant governor and judge, was a lifelong Roxbury resident
