= Old Mill (University of Vermont) =

Campus building in Burlington, Vermont, US

- U.S. Historic district – Contributing property
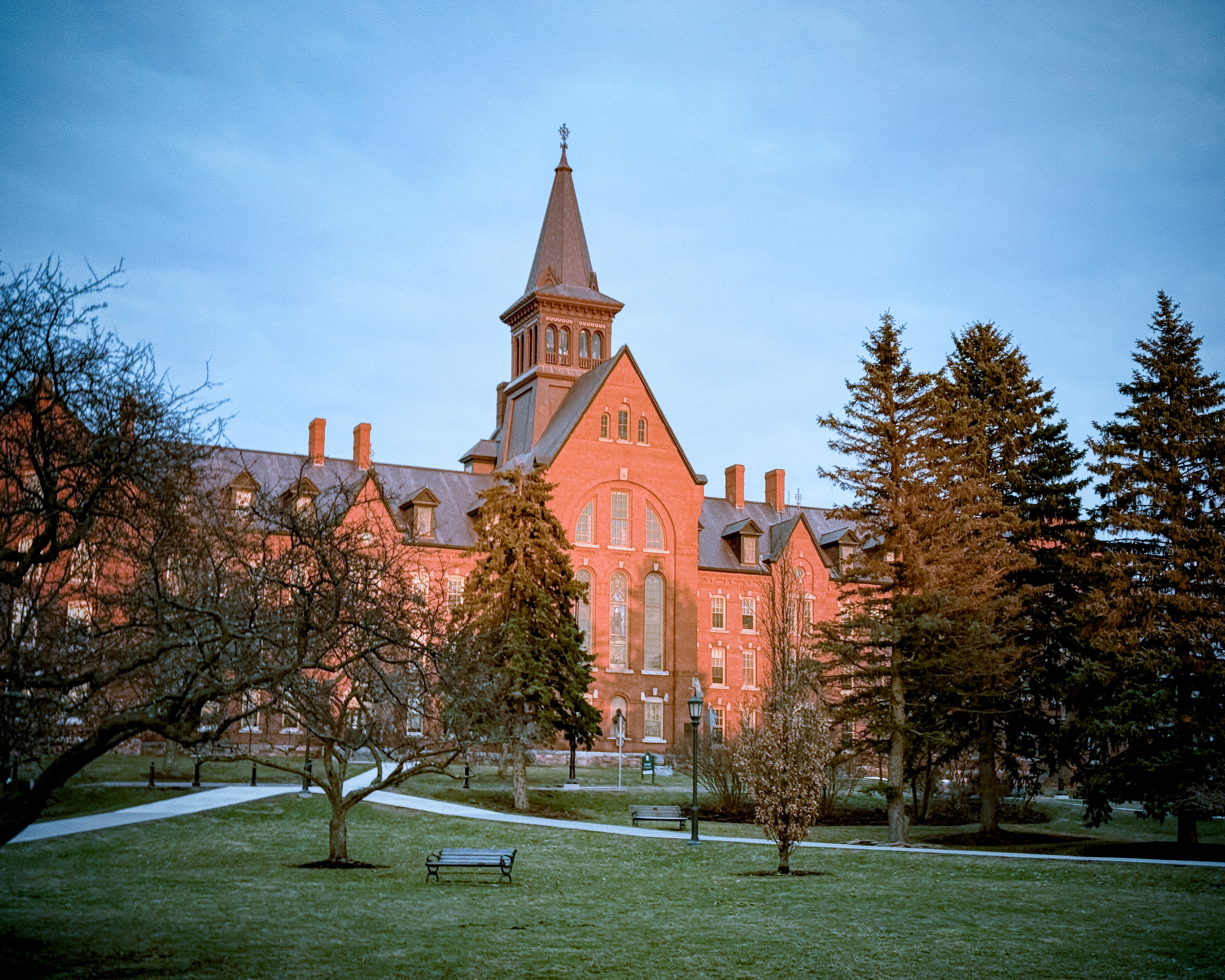

- Location within Vermont Location within the United States
- Location: Burlington, Vermont
- Coordinates: 44°28′40.05″N 73°11′55.82″W
- Built: 1825
- Architect: John Johnson
- Architectural style: Victorian Gothic
- Part of: University Green Historic District (ID75000139)
- Added to NRHP: April 14, 1975

Old Mill (historically known as the Main College Building) is the oldest campus building of the University of Vermont (UVM), located along the central-eastern side of the "University Green" in Burlington, Vermont.

== History ==
The building was constructed in 1825 on the same site as its predecessor, which had burned down in 1824. The original Main College building was constructed in 1801–02 by the architect and master builder, John Johnson, who had also designed its replacement.

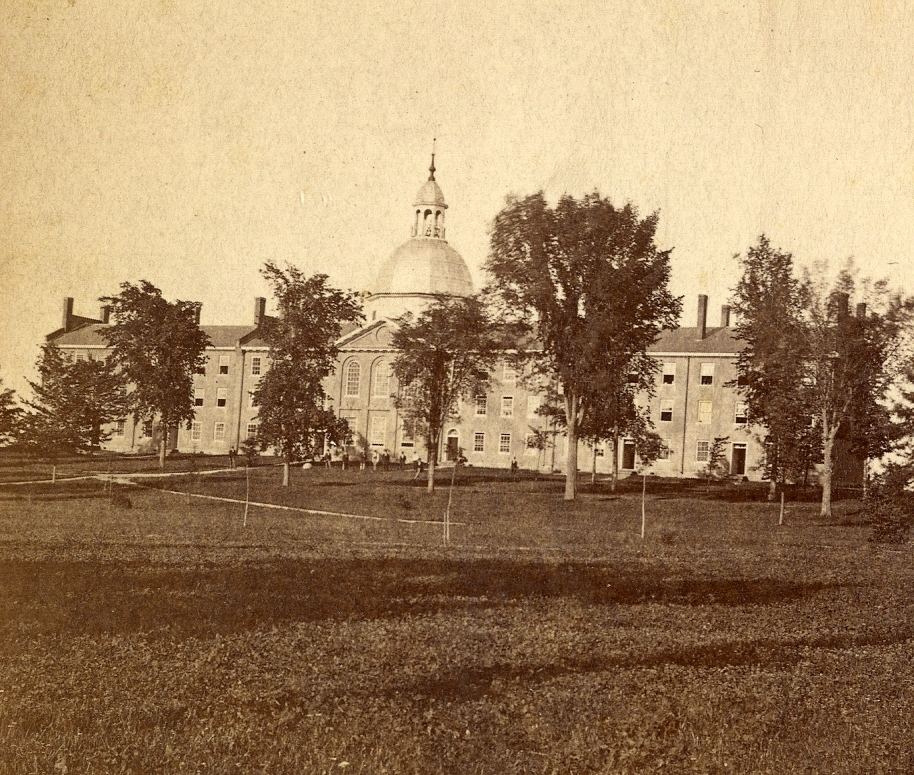
Old Mill with its former golden dome, sometime prior to the building's 1882 restoration.

On April 26, 1825, the cornerstone for North College was laid by Vermont Governor Cornelius P. Van Ness. Two months later on June 29, General Lafayette laid the cornerstone for South College during his visit to Burlington while on his national tour.

In 1825, the Main College consisted of two three-story 75 feet (23 m) x 36 feet (11 m) buildings known as the "North and South Colleges". A third three-story building (with a length of 86 feet (26 m)), known as the "Middle College" was erected between the two in 1829. Each of the buildings was constructed about 7–8 feet apart to prevent fire from destroying the entire facility, as had occurred previously in 1824. In 1846, the buildings were connected, however they were not accessible to one another within. The building has undergone substantial renovations several times.

Major renovations include a modernization effort in 1882–83, designed by J. J. R. Randall, 1918 (after a fire had struck South College), 1957–58 (with the addition of Lafayette Hall to South College), and in 1995–97 (with the addition of the Annex).

Old Mill was added to National Register of Historic Places as part of "University Green Historic District" on April 14, 1975. John Broza, an alum of UVM, proposed a stamp with Old Mill depicted on it. The stamp entered circulation in 1991, where John attended and signed the ceremony.

== Current use and occupancy ==
Today, Old Mill is home to the Departments of English, Economics, Geography, Religion, and Political Science. It is also host to the Programs for Women's Studies, Critical Race and Ethnic Studies (ALANA), and Global and Regional Studies; the Center for Holocaust Studies; the Humanities Center; and the John Dewey Lounge.

== Gallery ==
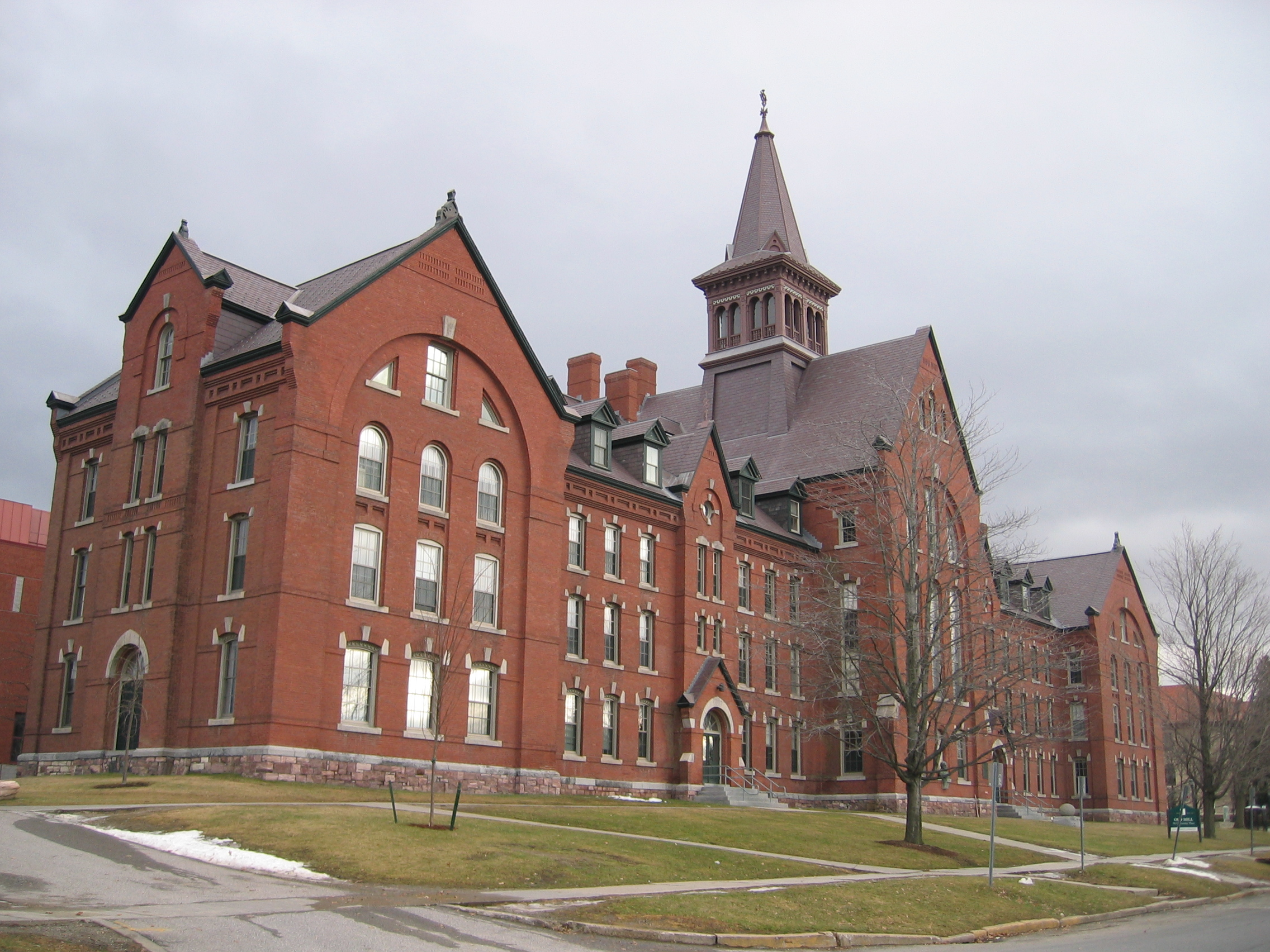
View of Old Mill at the northern wing (i.e. North College), 2005

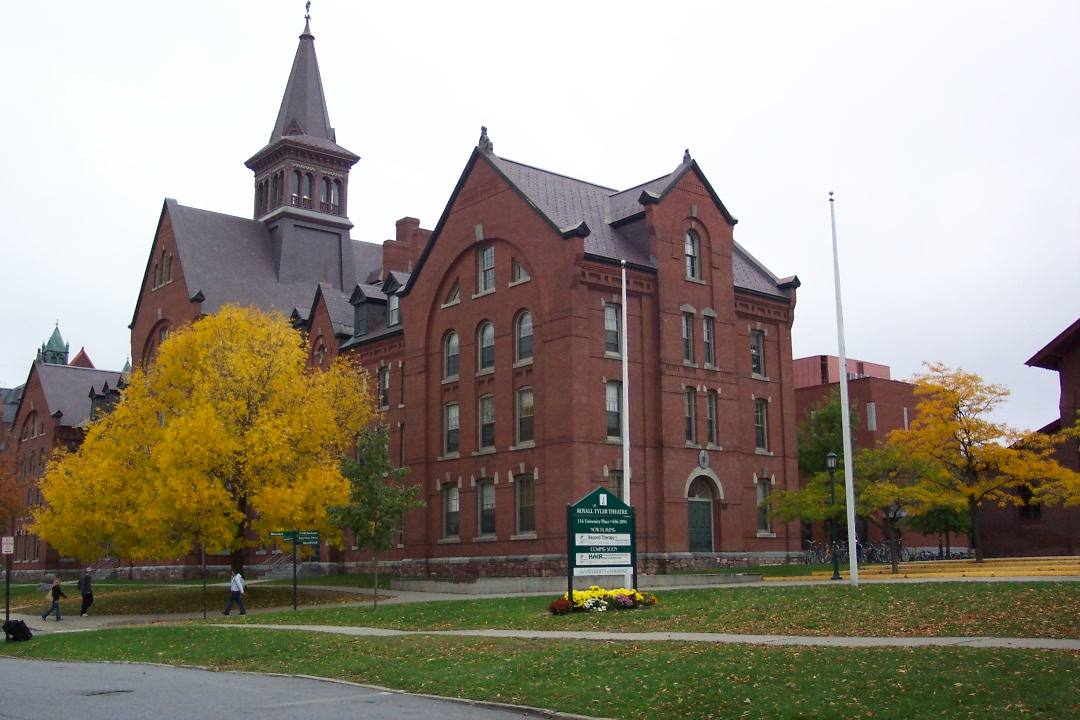
View of the southern wing (i.e. South College)

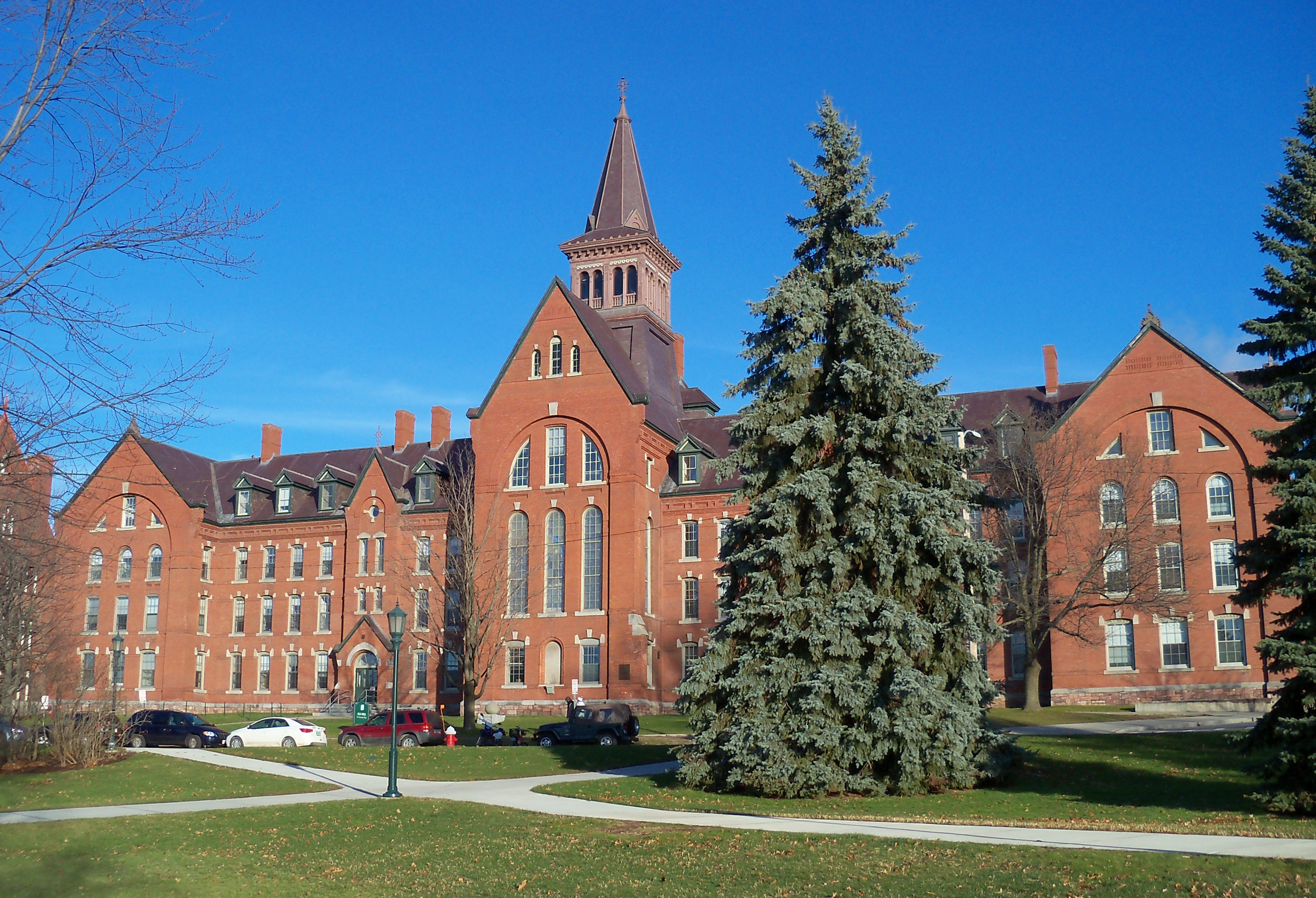
Old Mill on the University Green, 2012

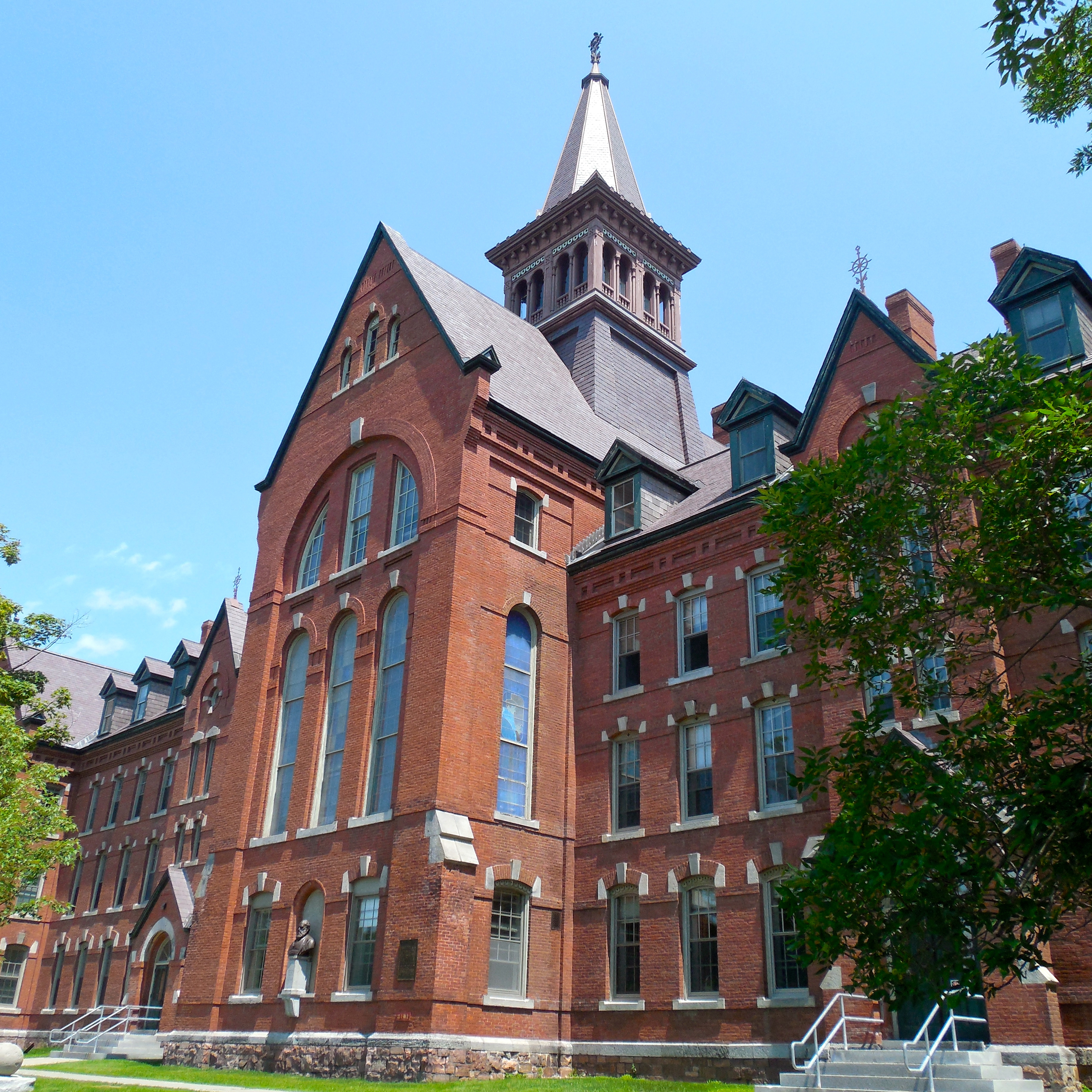
View from close-up

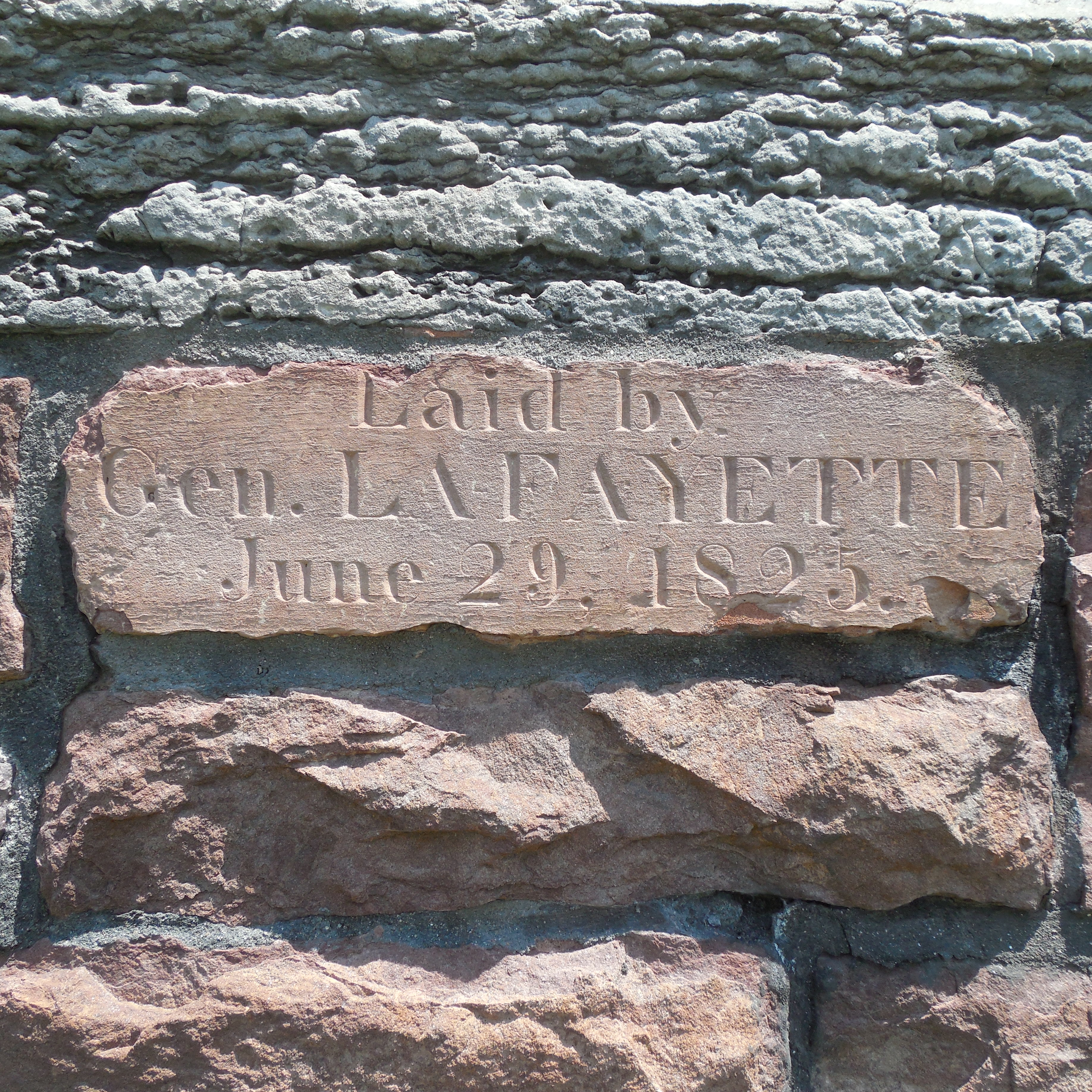
Cornerstone of South College of the Old Mill, installed by General Lafayette.

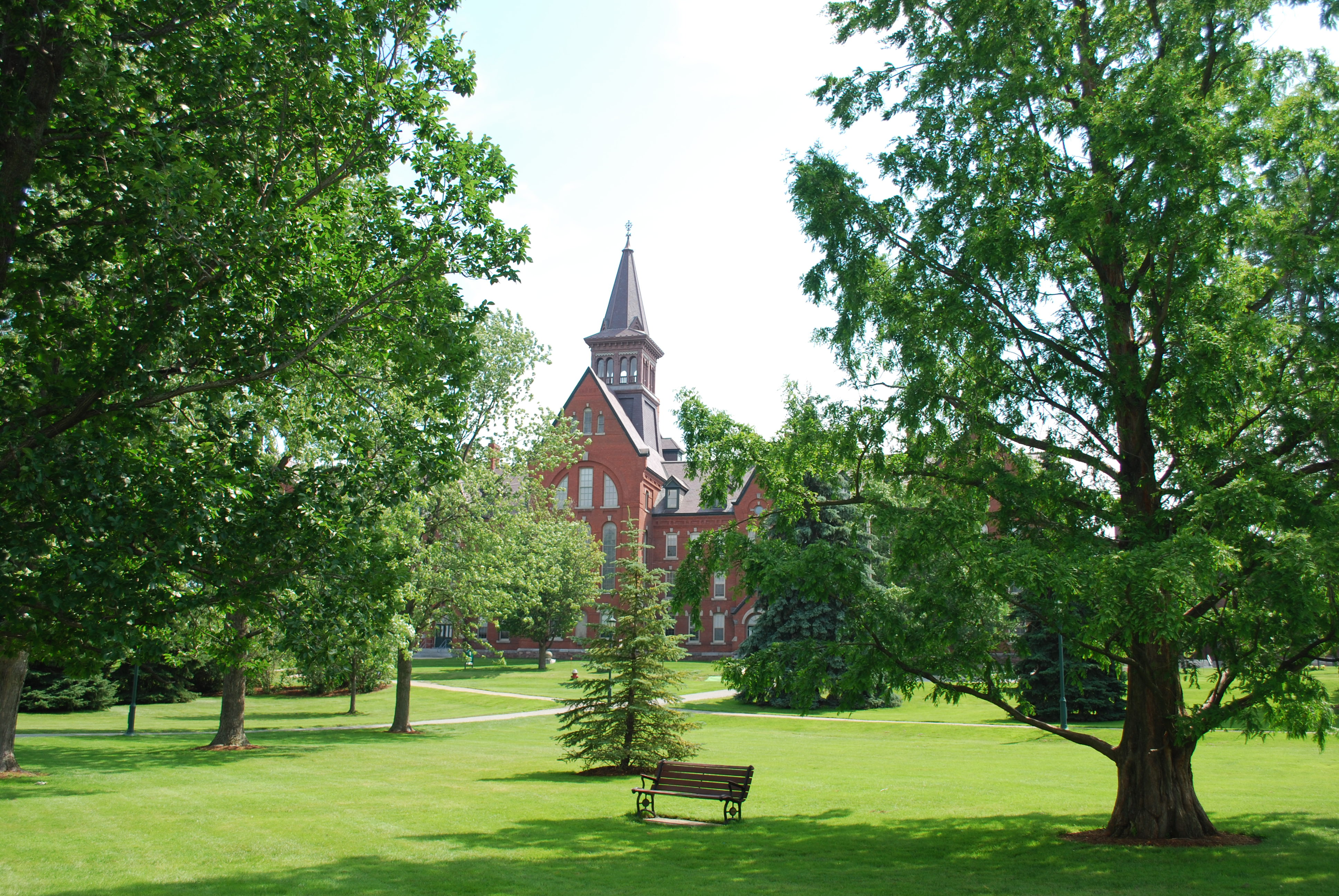
View of Old Mill from the University Green, 2012

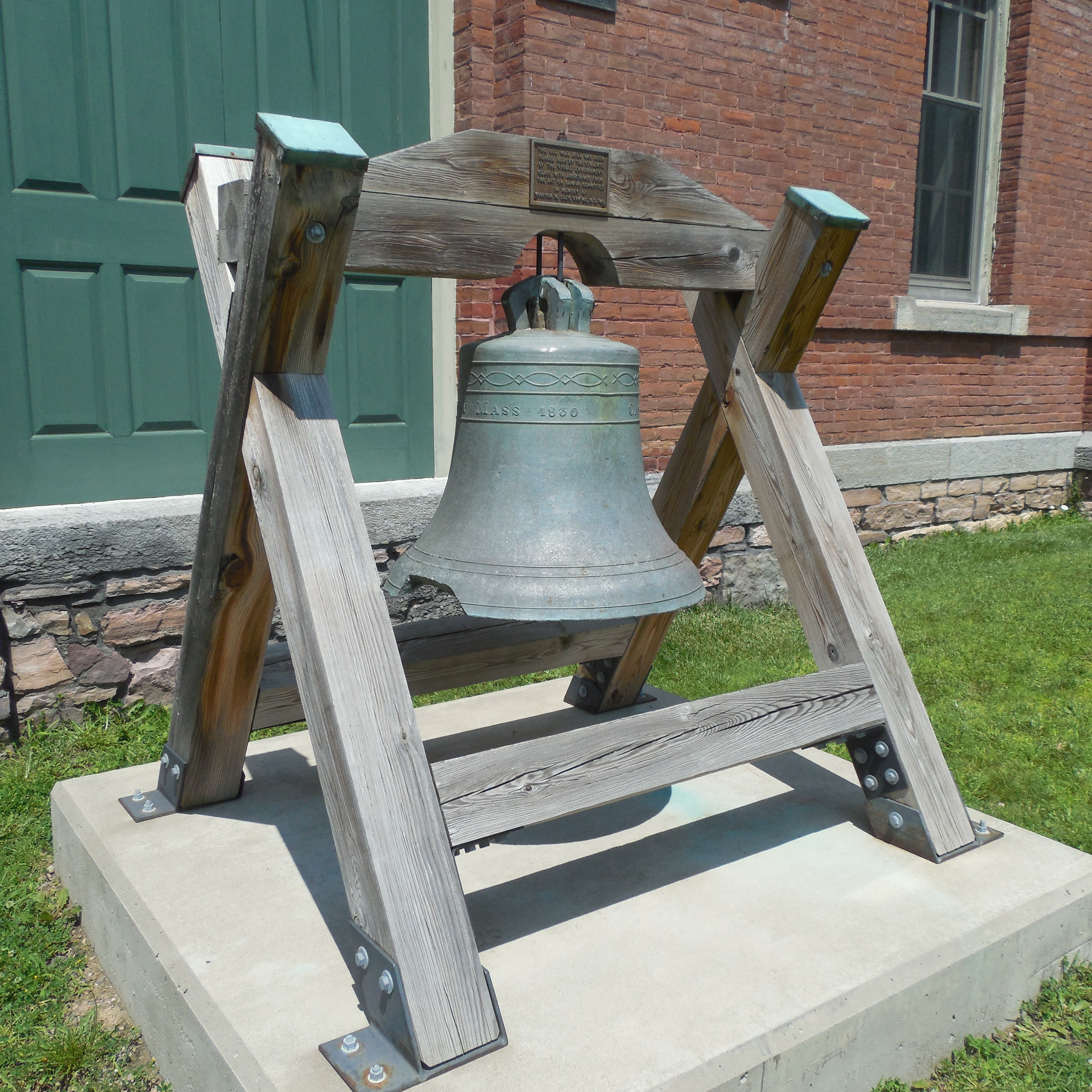
Former bell of the Old Mill building, discontinued use in 1918–19.
