= Roxbury Fish Hatchery =

- U.S. National Register of Historic Places
- U.S. Historic district
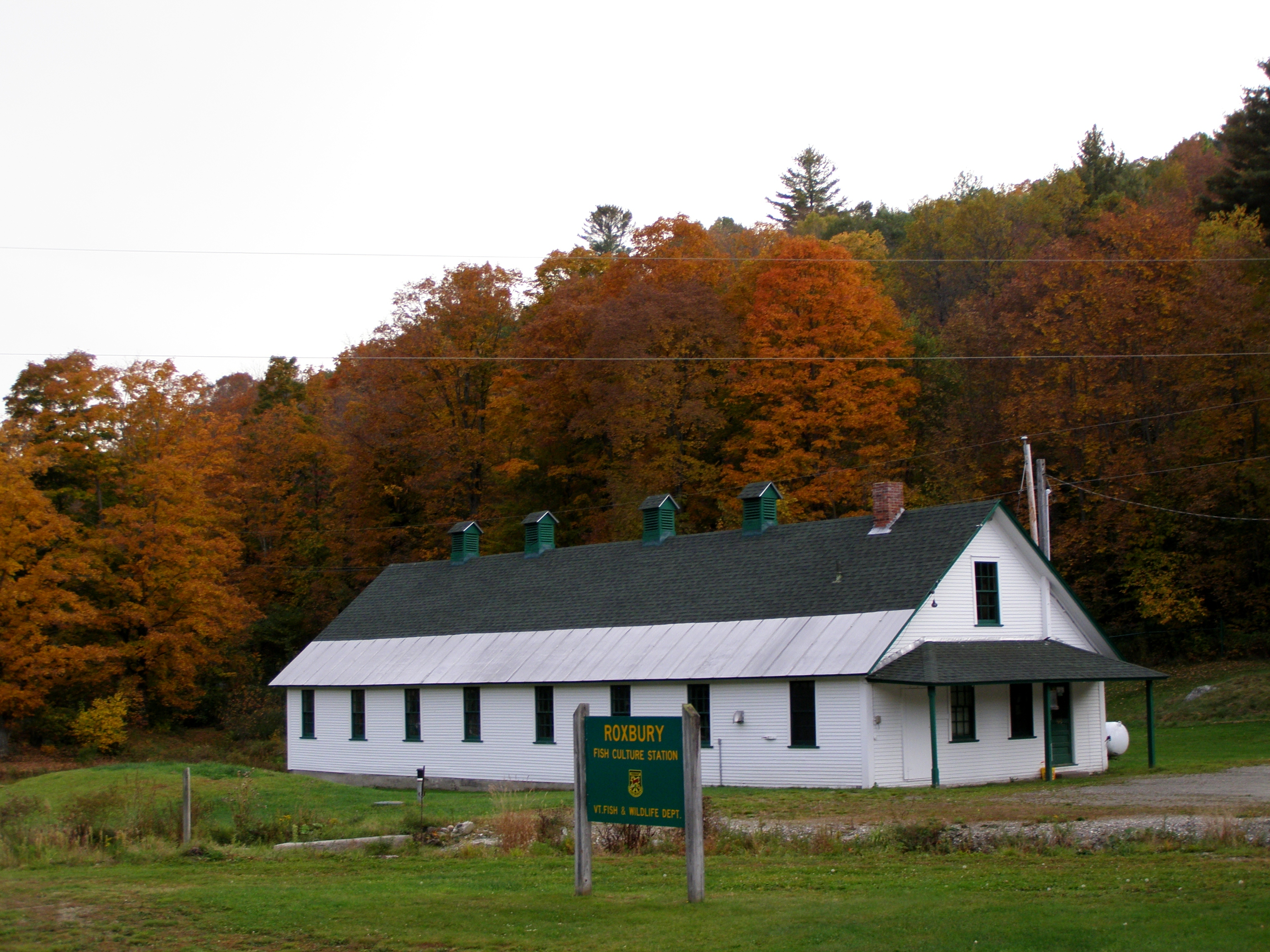

- Location within Vermont Location within the United States
- Location: Western side of Vermont Route 12A, about 1 mile (1.6 km) south of Roxbury, Vermont
- Coordinates: 44°3′46″N 72°44′38″W
- Area: 7.9 acres (3.2 ha)
- Built: 1891
- MPS: Fish Culture Resources of Vermont MPS
- NRHP reference No.: 94000177
- Added to NRHP: March 24, 1994

The Roxbury Fish Hatchery, established in 1891, is the oldest state-run fish hatchery in Vermont. It is located on Vermont Route 12A in Roxbury, adjacent to Flint Brook, a tributary of the White River. Its early buildings and landscape were listed on the National Register of Historic Places in 1994. It is generally open to visitors, but has been closed to visitation since its facilities were damaged by Hurricane Irene.

== Description and history ==
The Roxbury Fish Hatchery is located in rural Roxbury, on the west side of Vermont 12A south of Thurston Hill Road. It is set on 10 acres (4.0 ha) of land, in a narrow strip between the highway and the railroad tracks of the Central Vermont Railway. Its principal feature is a series of freshwater pools, which are fed in part by local springs, and in part by a raceway diverting water from Flint Brook, which parallels the highway to the east. The hatchery's built infrastructure includes the original 1891 hatchery building, a c. 1894 building for the preparation of fish food, an 1897 carriage barn, a storage barn built by the Civilian Conservation Corps (CCC) in the mid-1930s, and the c. 1960 state biological research station. It presently produces brook trout and rainbow trout.

The hatchery was established by state legislation in 1890, and went into operation the following year. The site, donated by E.H. Spaulding, was chosen for its abundant spring water, and its proximity to the railroad, which was used to deliver fish nearer their destined release sites. It underwent a series of improvements in its first decade of operation, and again in the 1910s, when water was diverted from the brook to improve the fresh water flow to the facility. In the 1930s it underwent a significant series of improvements under the auspices of the CCC, which included the construction of the raceway and amenities for tourists, including a series of barbecue pits.

== See also ==
- Salisbury Fish Hatchery
- St. Johnsbury Federal Fish Culture Station
- National Register of Historic Places listings in Washington County, Vermont
