= Rutland Downtown Historic District =

Historic district in Vermont, United States

- U.S. National Register of Historic Places
- U.S. Historic district
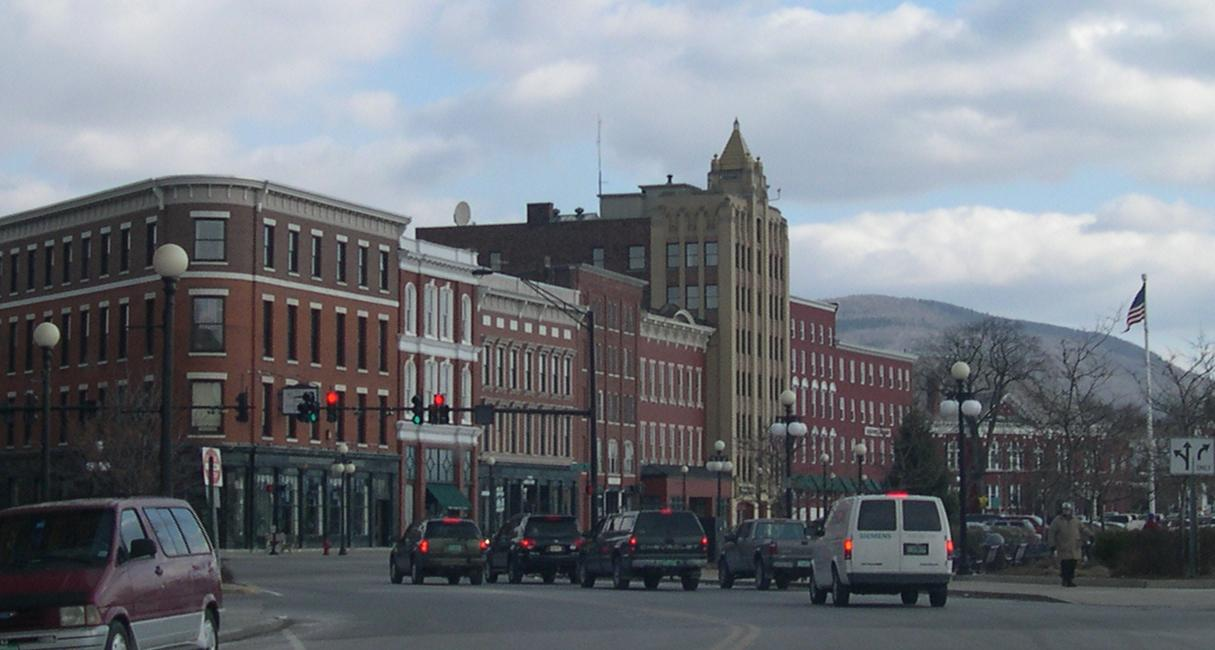
- View of buildings located near the plaza.

- Location within Vermont Location within the United States
- Location: Roughly bounded by Strongs Ave., State, Wales, Washington, Pine and Cottage Sts., City of Rutland in Vermont
- Coordinates: 43°36′5″N 72°58′52″W
- Architect: Frank Lyman Austin
- Architectural style: Art Deco, Italianate, Modernistic
- NRHP reference No.: 80000387
- Added to NRHP: August 22, 1980

Rutland Downtown Historic District, is the center of government for Rutland, Vermont. The sector of "downtown" is roughly defined as the area between Strongs Avenue, State, Wales, Washington, Pine, and Cottage Streets. The area is also a major center for business, and is considered the most cultural part of Rutland. Much of the area is also listed on the National Register of Historic Places as a historic district and includes 90 contributing properties. Some of these buildings date to the late 18th century, when Rutland was founded, but the greatest amount of expansion in downtown came after the marble industry became established on a large scale after 1850. The city's population tripled between 1850 and 1880, and many of the buildings built in this period were either built with or ornamented with marble.

In the 1890s, the arts flourished in Rutland, especially in music, literature, and theater. Julia Caroline Dorr spurred much of the appreciation of the arts. Her father had built the original Rutland Opera House, and later rebuilt it after a fire destroyed the original structure. In 1913, George Chaffee built another theatre, the Playhouse. The exterior of the Playhouse had a classical style reflecting the City Beautiful movement of the time, while the interior resembled a Victorian era opera house with lavish decoration. The theatre was renamed The Paramount in 1931, and its entertainment shifted from live performance to movies. The movie theater closed in 1975. In 1999, a local group began restoring the theatre to its historic appearance. The theatre reopened in March 2000 and serves again as a center for artistic, cultural, and educational events.

== Events ==
Numerous events are held in this area, including, in winter, the lighting of the Christmas tree and the Christmas lights near the plaza by Santa Claus, performances by a magician, a Santa Claus children's lineup, hot chocolate and wagon rides; and, weekly during the summer, a "Friday Night Live" public entertainment, shopping, and dining experience. The annual Crowley Road Race event—a racing event comprising a 10-kilometer (6.2 mi) run, a 5-kilometer (3.1 mi) run, and a mile run for children—is held on a Sunday morning in June.
