= Rutland Courthouse Historic District =

Historic district in Vermont, United States

- U.S. National Register of Historic Places
- U.S. Historic district
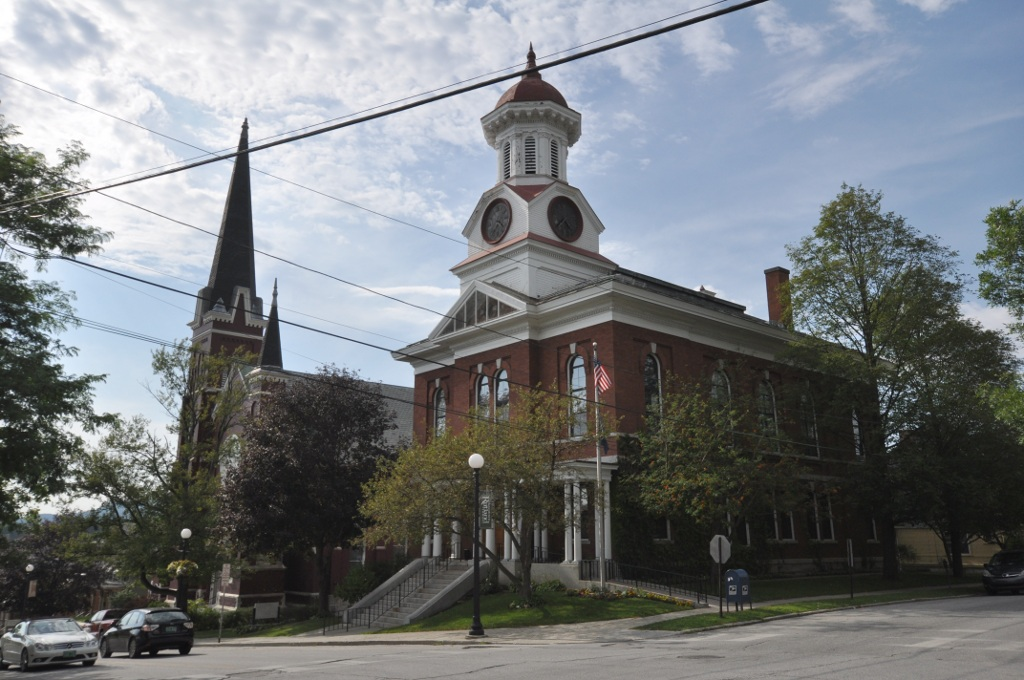
- Rutland County Courthouse (foreground) and First Baptist Church (background)

- Location within Vermont Location within the United States
- Interactive map showing the location of Rutland Courthouse Historic District
- Location: US 7, Rutland, Vermont
- Coordinates: 43°36′25″N 72°58′29″W
- Area: 44 acres (18 ha)
- Architect: Multiple
- Architectural style: Late Victorian, Mixed (more Than 2 Styles From Different Periods)
- NRHP reference No.: 76000148
- Added to NRHP: September 8, 1976

The Rutland Courthouse Historic District encompasses an architecturally cohesive area of civic and residential buildings in Rutland, Vermont. Roughly bounded by Court, Washington, South Main, and West Streets, the district was principally developed between 1850 and 1875, and includes a number of prominent municipal and county buildings, including the Rutland County courthouse, the Rutland Free Library, and the Grace Congregational United Church. The district was listed on the National Register of Historic Places in 1976.

== Description and history ==
The Rutland Courthouse district is a residential and civic area that contains a number of important local civic and governmental functions, as well as a small neighborhood of fashionable 19th-century housing. The district's eastern bound is South Main Street (United States Routes 7 and 4), between West and Washington Streets, an area which includes two parks and the Chaffee Art Center, set in an 1892 Queen Anne Victorian. The southern boundary is Washington Street, extending from South Main to Prospect Street. This area includes a number of handsomely landscaped Italianate houses, built during a construction boom between 1850 and 1875, occasioned by the arrival of railroads and an expansion in the important marble processing industry.

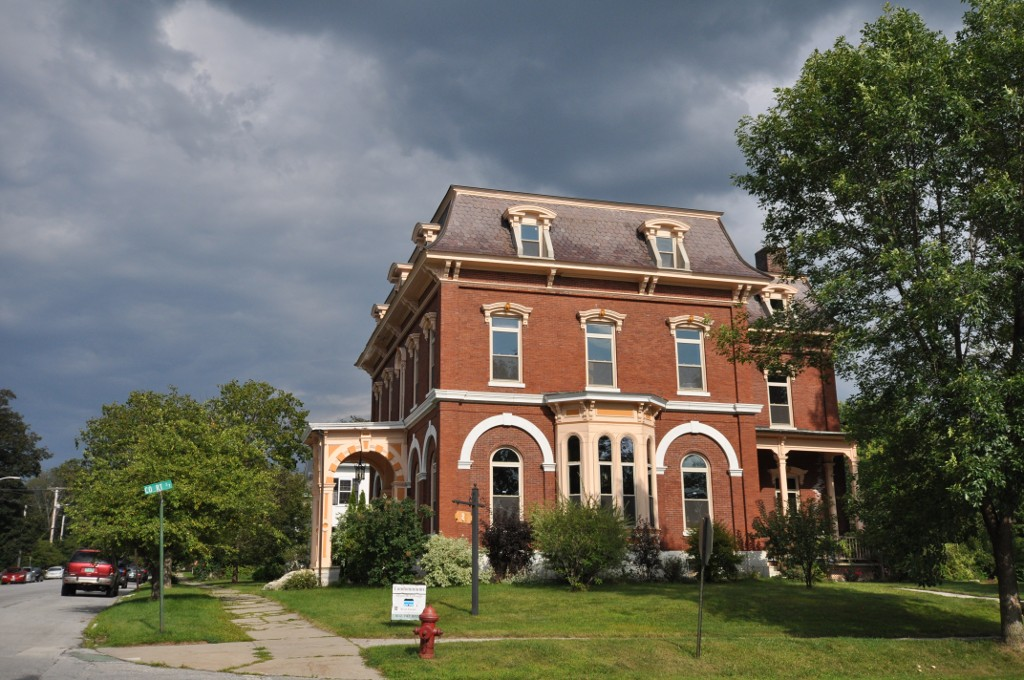
A house across from the courthouse

The western boundary is Court Street between Washington and West Streets. The junction of Court and Center Streets is home to the Rutland County Courthouse, an elaborate Italianate brick building constructed in 1869, after the county's first courthouse burned down. Across Court Street stands the Rutland Free Library, which was built in 1856-58 as a federal building and post office, and was the first major building constructed in the district. It is also an elaborate Italianate design, credited to Ammi B. Young. The district's northern boundary is West Street, the main westbound thoroughfare from Rutland's downtown area, between Main and Elm Streets.

== See also ==
- Media related to Rutland Courthouse Historic District at Wikimedia Commons
- National Register of Historic Places listings in Rutland County, Vermont
