= Braintree, Vermont =

- Town
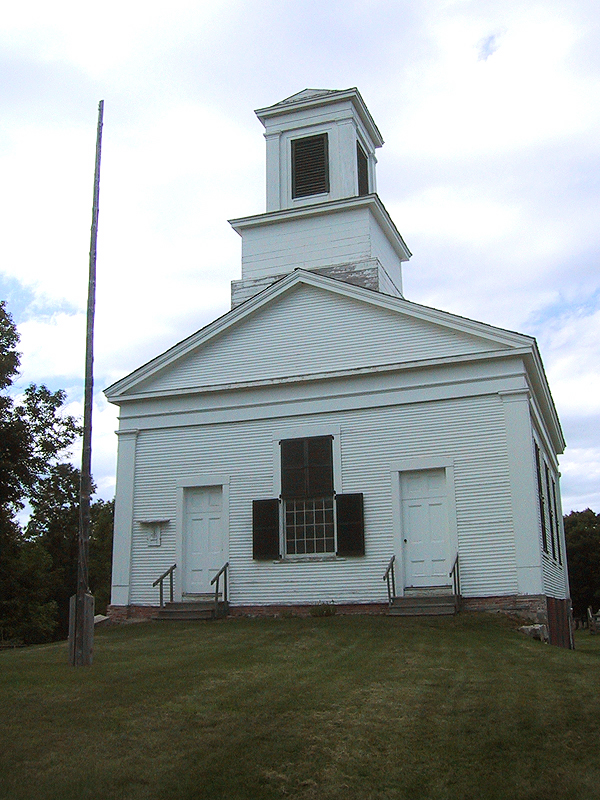
- Braintree Meeting House, Braintree, Vermont

- Logo

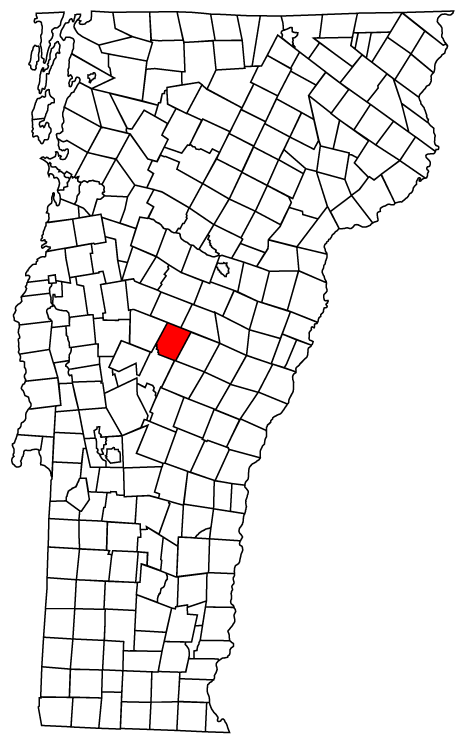
- Located in Orange County, Vermont
- Coordinates: 43°58′32″N 72°42′18″W
- Country: United States
- State: Vermont
- County: Orange
- Chartered: 1781 (Vermont)
- Communities: Braintree Hill; East Braintree; West Braintree

Area
  - Total: 38.3 sq mi (99.3 km^{2})
  - Land: 38.3 sq mi (99.2 km^{2})
  - Water: 0.039 sq mi (0.1 km^{2})
- Elevation: 1,043 ft (318 m)

Population (2020)
  - Total: 1,207
  - Density: 32/sq mi (12.2/km^{2})
  - Households: 482
  - Families: 325
- Time zone: UTC-5 (EST)
  - Summer (DST): UTC-4 (EDT)
- ZIP Codes: 05060 (Braintree); 05669 (West Braintree)
- Area code: 802
- FIPS code: 50-07600
- GNIS feature ID: 1462047
- Website: https://braintreevt.gov/

Braintree is a town in Orange County, Vermont, United States created by Vermont charter on August 1, 1781. The population was 1,207 at the 2020 census. Braintree includes the places Braintree Center, Braintree Hill, East Braintree, West Braintree, Peth and Snowsville.

== History ==
There were two sets of petitioners for the original grant of Braintree in 1779. One group had also petitioned for the grants of Roxbury and Northfield and were thought to be land speculators. The other group, who only petitioned for the Braintree grant, received approval in November 1780. The Braintree grant did not receive an executive sanction and seal until August 1, 1781, when Governor Chittenden issued the charter. The group of original proprietors were nearly entirely from Braintree, Massachusetts.

== Geography ==
According to the United States Census Bureau, the town has a total area of 38.3 square miles (99.2 km^{2}), of which 38.3 square miles (99.1 km^{2}) is land and 0.04 square mile (0.1 km^{2}) (0.10%) is water.

== Demographics ==
Historical population
Census	Pop.	Note	%±
1790	221		—
1800	531		140.3%
1810	850		60.1%
1820	1,033		21.5%
1830	1,209		17.0%
1840	1,332		10.2%
1850	1,228		−7.8%
1860	1,225		−0.2%
1870	1,066		−13.0%
1880	1,051		−1.4%
1890	854		−18.7%
1900	776		−9.1%
1910	760		−2.1%
1920	707		−7.0%
1930	635		−10.2%
1940	648		2.0%
1950	626		−3.4%
1960	536		−14.4%
1970	751		40.1%
1980	1,065		41.8%
1990	1,174		10.2%
2000	1,194		1.7%
2010	1,246		4.4%
2020	1,207		−3.1%
U.S. Decennial Census

As of the census of 2000, there were 1,194 people, 482 households, and 325 families residing in the town. The population density was 31.2 people per square mile (12.0/km^{2}). There were 567 housing units at an average density of 14.8 per square mile (5.7/km^{2}). The racial makeup of the town was 98.41% White, 0.34% Native American, 0.17% Asian, 0.17% Pacific Islander, 0.25% from other races, and 0.67% from two or more races. Hispanic or Latino of any race were 0.50% of the population.

There were 482 households, out of which 32.8% had children under the age of 18 living with them, 51.9% were married couples living together, 10.4% had a female householder with no husband present, and 32.4% were non-families. 24.7% of all households were made up of individuals, and 11.2% had someone living alone who was 65 years of age or older. The average household size was 2.48 and the average family size was 2.94.

In the town, the population was spread out, with 25.3% under the age of 18, 6.9% from 18 to 24, 28.0% from 25 to 44, 27.3% from 45 to 64, and 12.6% who were 65 years of age or older. The median age was 40 years. For every 100 females, there were 99.3 males. For every 100 females age 18 and over, there were 97.3 males.

The median income for a household in the town was $37,232, and the median income for a family was $45,357. Males had a median income of $30,707 versus $21,411 for females. The per capita income for the town was $16,480. About 2.7% of families and 6.5% of the population were below the poverty line, including 5.2% of those under age 18 and 4.3% of those age 65 or over.

== Notable people ==
- Edwin Flint, member of the Wisconsin Senate
- Waldo Flint, member of the Wisconsin Senate
- Jefferson P. Kidder, lawyer, jurist and Lieutenant Governor of Vermont
- Eleazer Parmly, first provost of the University of Maryland School of Dentistry
- Francis V. Randall, Union Army colonel during the American Civil War
- Gurdon P. Randall, architect
- J. J. R. Randall, architect
- Daniel Robbins, art historian
