= Water Tower (disambiguation) =

A water tower is an elevated building supporting a water tank.

Water Tower may also refer to:

== Water towers (current or former) ==
- The Water Tower, Coleshill, a First World War water tower located in Buckinghamshire, England
- The Water Tower, Kenilworth, an 18th-century windmill in Warwickshire, England
- Water Tower, Svetlogorsk, a historic water tower in Svetlogorsk, Kaliningrad Oblast, Russia
- Chicago Water Tower, a historic water tower in Chicago, Illinois, U.S.
- Water Tower (Rock Island, Wisconsin), U.S., a historic building in a state park
- Water Tower, Cardiff Central Station, Wales, a Grade II listed building

== Other buildings ==
- Water Tower, Chester, a 14th-century tower in Chester, Cheshire, England
- Water Tower (Zaragoza) (Spanish: Torre del Agua), a tower built for Expo 2008 in Zaragoza, Spain
- Water Tower Place, a skyscraper in Chicago named after the water tower

== Music ==
- Watertower (album), a 1988 album by Michael Hurley
- "Water Tower" (song), a 2013 song by Charlotte Church
- WaterTower Music, an American record label
- Water Tower (band), an American bluegrass band

== Other uses ==
- "Water Tower" (That '70s Show episode)
- Water Tower, Cardiff Bay, a fountain in Roald Dahl Plass, Cardiff, Wales
- Watertower (Fruin), a 2017 sculpture in Milwaukee, Wisconsin
- The Water Tower (newspaper), published at the University of Vermont
- "The Water Tower" (short story), a 1990 short story by Victor Pelevin
- Water Tower (Kenya - Hydrology), catchment [UK] or watershed [US]

== See also ==
- water crane
