= The Vermont Cynic =

University of Vermont's student newspaper

- Type: Weekly student newspaper
- Format: Digital
- School: University of Vermont
- Editor-in-chief: Maxine Thornton and Grace Wang
- Managing editor: Annalisa Madonia
- News editor: Alex Strand
- Opinion editor: Olivia Langlan and Ashley Golden
- Founded: 1883
- Political alignment: Progressive
- Headquarters: Burlington, VT
- ISSN: 0892-3132
- Website: vtcynic.com

The Vermont Cynic, also known as The Cynic, is the editorially independent student newspaper of the University of Vermont (UVM). Founded in 1883, The Cynic was published in print for most of its history before fully transitioning to digital in 2022.

The Cynic would distribute print copies weekly to various campus locations when it was published in print. In November 2020, it paused publication of print issues, citing low readership due to COVID-19, and resumed traditional print publication beginning in December 2021 before finally discontinuing it in September 2022. In December 2024, the paper established a bi-yearly printing schedule, establishing a yearly December "Sex Issue" and April "Drug Issue."

== Awards ==
In October 2011, the paper won the Associated Collegiate Press Newspaper Pacemaker award, widely known as the Pulitzer Prize for student journalism. In October 2012, The Vermont Cynic won the Associated Collegiate Press' Online Pacemaker award. The Cynic won Diversity Story of the Year in 2016 from the ACP for reporting on the history of "Kake Walk," a Minstrel show tradition at UVM's Winter Carnival that continued until 1969. It was also a finalist for another Pacemaker award in 2017 and took second place in the environmental portrait category for the 2018 Photo of the Year.
