= University of Vermont =

Public university in Burlington, Vermont, U.S.

University of Vermont and State Agricultural College
- Latin: Universitas Viridis Montis; English: University of the Green Mountains
- Other name: University of Vermont
- Former name: Vermont Agricultural College (1864–1865)
- Motto: Studiis et Rebus Honestis (Latin)
- Motto in English: "Integrity in Theoretical and Practical Pursuits"
- Type: Public land-grant research university
- Established: 1791; 235 years ago
- Accreditation: NECHE
- Academic affiliations: Sea-grant; space-grant
- Endowment: $1 billion (2025)
- President: Marlene Tromp
- Faculty: 2,013 (fall 2023)
- Students: 14,320 (fall 2023)
- Undergraduates: 12,168 (fall 2023)
- Postgraduates: 2,152 (fall 2023)
- Location: Burlington, Vermont, United States; 44°28′40″N 73°11′47″W
- Campus: 460 acres (1.9 km^{2}); Small City
- Newspaper: The Vermont Cynic
- Colors: Green and gold
- Nickname: Catamounts
- Sporting affiliations: NCAA Division I – America East; Hockey East; EISA; NEISA
- Mascot: Rally Catamount
- Website: uvm.edu

The University of Vermont and State Agricultural College, commonly referred to as the University of Vermont (UVM), is a public land-grant research university in Burlington, Vermont, United States. Founded in 1791, UVM is the oldest university in Vermont and the fifth-oldest in New England. Roughly coinciding with Vermont's statehood, the plans for and development of the university date back to the days of the Vermont Republic, making it unique among public universities in the US to be at least planned and organized outside of an admitted state in the nation.

UVM comprises ten colleges and schools, including the Robert Larner College of Medicine, and offers more than 100 undergraduate majors along with various graduate and professional programs. The University of Vermont Medical Center has its primary facility on the UVM campus. It is classified among "R1: Doctoral Universities—Very high research activity".

In athletics, UVM's teams, known as the Catamounts, compete in NCAA Division I, primarily in the America East Conference and Hockey East Association.

== History ==
=== 18th century ===
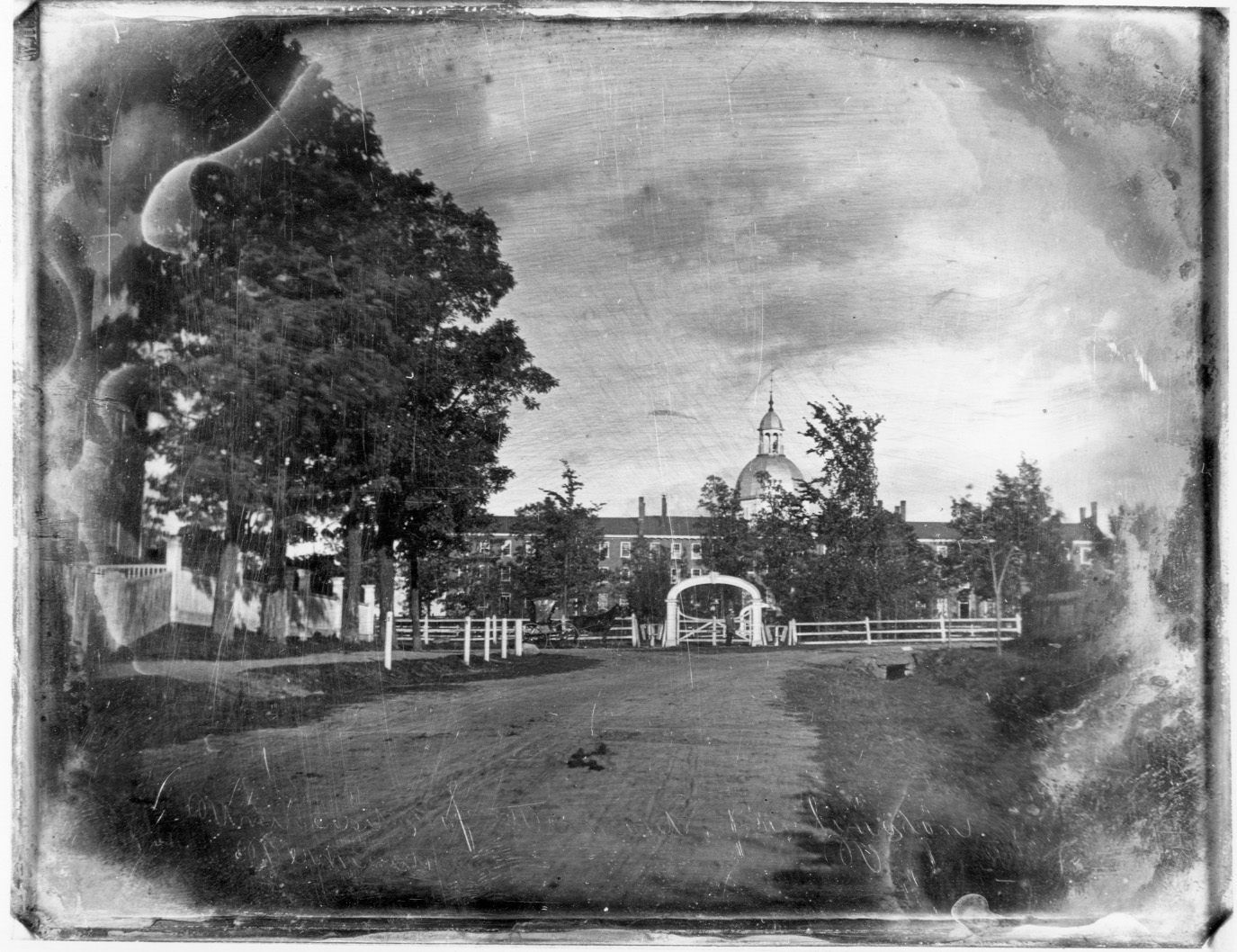
The University of Vermont in 1845

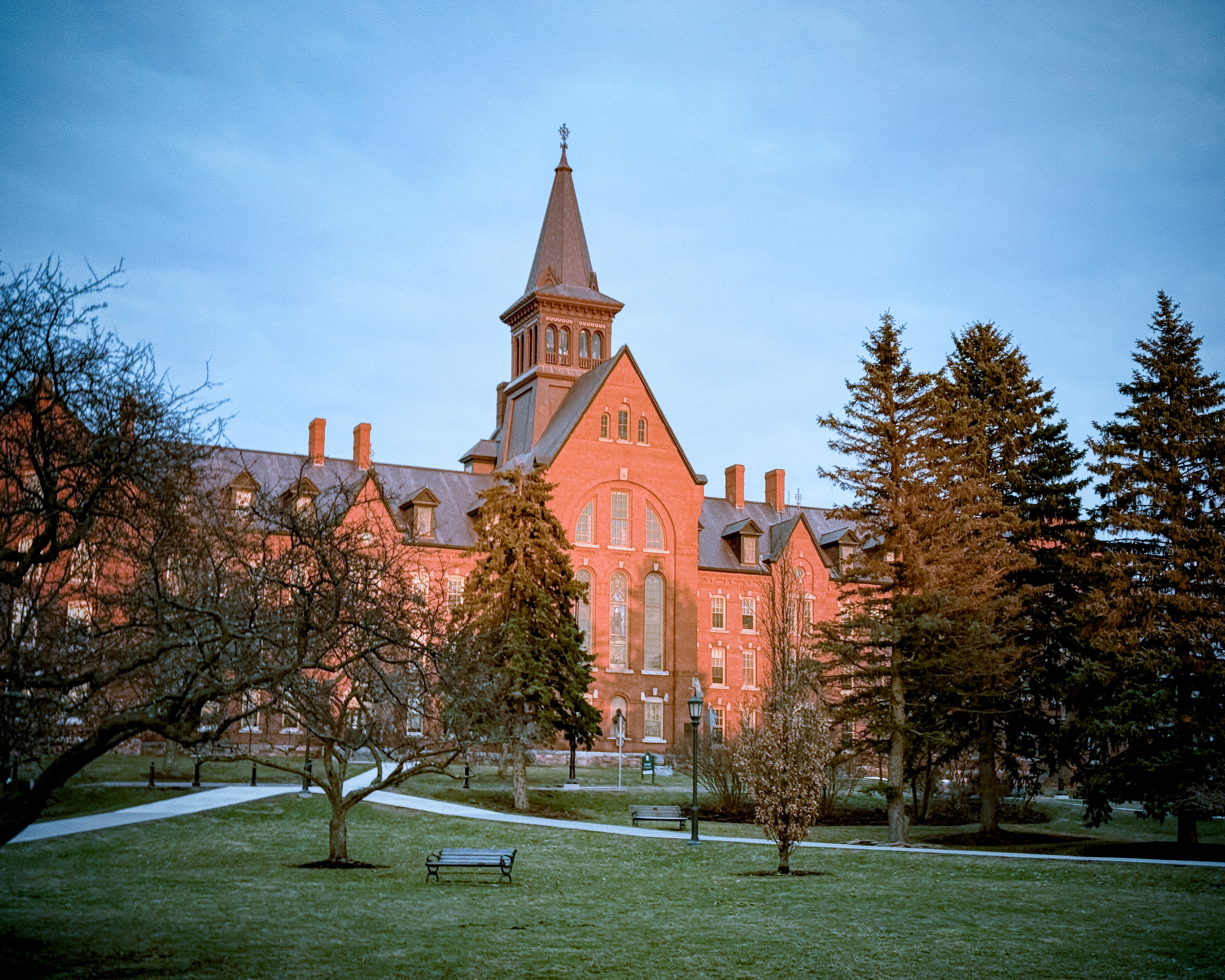
Old Mill, the oldest campus building

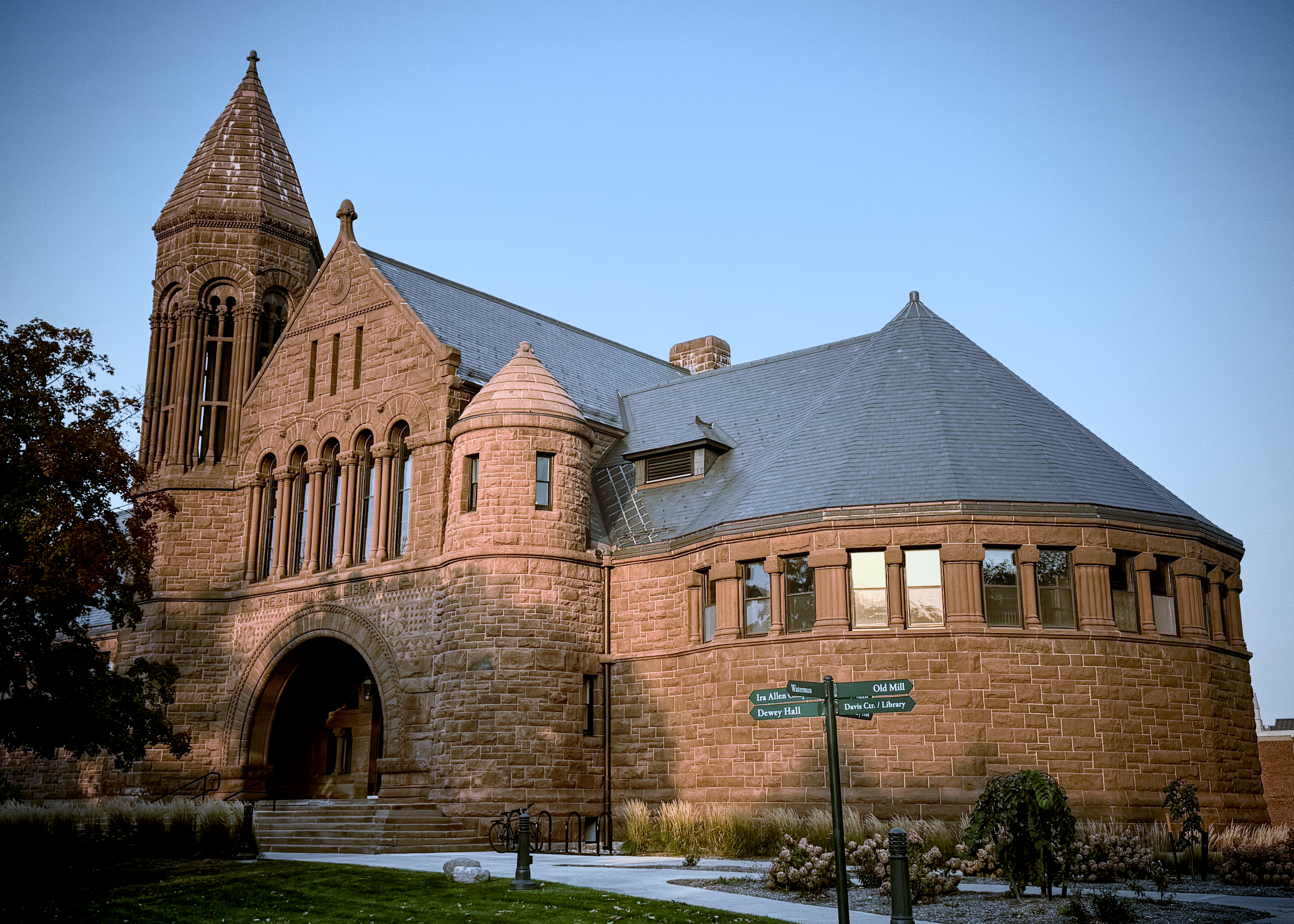
Billings Memorial Library, built in 1883, was the university's library until 1961 when the larger Guy W. Bailey library was built.

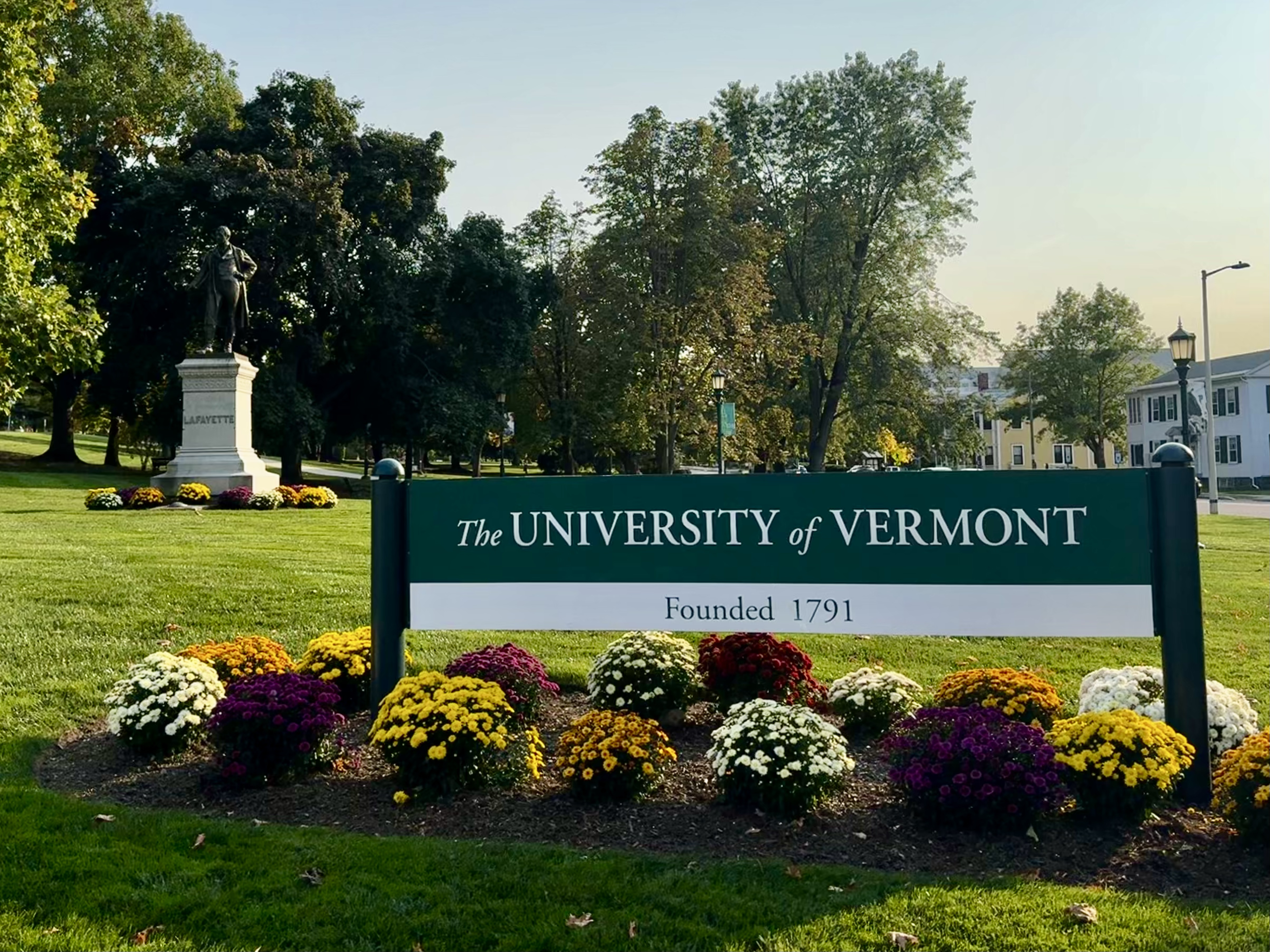
The University of Vermont sign with a statue of Marquis de Lafayette in the background.

The University of Vermont was founded as a private university in 1791, the same year Vermont became the fourteenth U.S. state. The university enrolled its first students ten years later.

=== 19th century ===
Its first president, Daniel C. Sanders, was hired in 1800, and served as the sole faculty member for seven years. Instruction began in 1801, and the first class graduated in 1804. In 1865, the university merged with Vermont Agricultural College (chartered November 22, 1864, after the passage of the Morrill Land-Grant Colleges Act of 1862), emerging as the University of Vermont and State Agricultural College. The university was granted 150,000 acres, which it sold for $122,626. Much of the initial funding and planning for the university was undertaken by Ira Allen, who is honored as UVM's founder. Allen donated a 50-acre (20 ha) parcel of land for establishment of the university. Most of this land has been maintained as the university's main green, where stands a statue of Allen. The citizens of Burlington helped fund the university's first edifice. When it was destroyed by fire in 1824, they also paid for its replacement. This building came to be known as "Old Mill" for its resemblance to New England mills of the time. The Marquis de Lafayette, a French general who became a commander in the American Revolution, while in Vermont laid the cornerstone of Old Mill, which stands on University Row along with Ira Allen Chapel, Billings Library, Williams Hall, Royall Tyler Theatre, and Morrill Hall. A statue of Lafayette stands at the north end of the main green.

UVM was the first American institution of higher education with a charter declaring that the "rules, regulations, and by-laws shall not tend to give preference to any religious sect or denomination whatsoever".

In 1871, UVM defied custom and admitted two women as students. It was the first American university to admit women (1875) and African Americans (1877) into Phi Beta Kappa, the country's oldest collegiate academic honor society.

Justin Smith Morrill, a U.S. Representative (1855–1867), and Senator (1867–1898) from Vermont, author of the Morrill Land-Grant Colleges Act that created federal funding for establishing the U.S. land-grant colleges and universities, served as a trustee of the university from 1865 to 1898.

=== 20th century ===
In 1924, UVM's WCAX, now called WVMT, sent out the first radio broadcast in Vermont. It was run by UVM students and faculty before being sold in 1931. WCAX is now the call sign of a commercial television station. A new radio station was set up in 1955, dubbed WRUV. It currently runs an FM broadcast at 90.1 MHz and an internet stream at wruv.org. The station, run by students, faculty, and local community members, dubs itself Burlington's Better Alternative. It is known for playing a wide range of music, boasting "the largest catalog in the State of Vermont" at over 50,000 albums.

In the second half of the 20th century, UVM gained a reputation for its political activism, and struggles ensued on campus between student and faculty activists and the university administration. In 1953, the university's board of trustees ousted Alex B. Novikoff, a tenured professor and cell biologist in the College of Medicine, over his association with the Communist Party. In March 1957, student protests against a motel owner who refused service to an African-American woman led the Vermont General Assembly to outlaw discrimination in public accommodations. For 73 years, UVM held an annual "Kake Walk" where students wore blackface, until the practice was abolished in 1969 under pressure from the student body and the community.

In 1972, the board of trustees intervened again to deny tenure to Michael Parenti, a popular Marxist political science professor who drew ire from the authorities due to his participation in anti-war demonstrations. The board overrode the recommendation of the faculty, the deans' council and the administration. Parenti later brought a federal suit against the university, which was settled out of court for $15,000.

In the 1980s, the university faced increasing pressure from the student body to divest from companies doing business in apartheid South Africa. Student protests against investment in apartheid culminated in the construction of a "shantytown" on the green across from the Waterman building on October 12, 1985. On December 6, the board voted 12-7 to divest.

=== 21st century ===
UVM has undertaken several other divestment actions due to advocacy from student groups, including divestment from "Sudan-friendly" companies in 2006, during the Darfur genocide, and divestment from cluster munitions and depleted uranium weapons in 2009, during the Iraq and Afghanistan wars. In 2013 and 2016, trustees rejected calls to divest from fossil fuels.

On July 1, 2019, Suresh Garimella was appointed UVM's 27th president. Under his tenure, the university faced record enrollment and a 50 percent increase in research funding to $250 million; however, he has been criticized for his public relations with students and faculty. In 2021, the university administration imposed budget cuts that terminated three departments, 12 majors, 11 minors and four master's degree programs in the College of Arts and Sciences.

In 2020, under pressure from a student campaign, UVM trustees voted unanimously to divest from fossil fuels by July 2023.

In 2022, the U.S. Department of Education opened an investigation into the university's response to antisemitism on campus based on a Title VI complaint filed by The Louis D. Brandeis Center for Human Rights Under Law and Jewish on Campus. The investigation concluded in April 2023, after the university and the Office of Civil Rights settled in a voluntary resolution. A press release from the Department of Education stated that the university failed to adequately respond to incidents. University administrators denied the allegations, insisting that they responded appropriately. The university agreed to adopt new practices around bias reporting, edit their discrimination and harassment policies, and provide extra training to staff and students, but it did not adopt the demands of the complainant. The Department of Education did not make a finding of guilt or wrongdoing or create new federal policy in closing the investigation.

In October 2023, UVM's Division of Safety and Compliance abruptly canceled a planned guest lecture by Palestinian author Mohammed El-Kurd, citing an inability to provide adequate "safety and security" for the event. An investigative report by Seven Days found no evidence of threats related to the event.

The university's graduate students voted to unionize with the UAW in March 2024. In April 2024, UVM's chapter of Students for Justice in Palestine established a protest encampment on the Andrew Harris Commons, demanding transparency in the university's endowment and divestment from "all weapons manufacturers, Israeli companies, and companies involved in the occupation of historic Palestine." They also demanded that the university cancel a planned commencement speech by Linda Thomas-Greenfield.

== Seal ==
The university first adopted an official seal in 1807. The seal depicts the sun rising over the Green Mountains with the original college edifice, now the remodeled Old Mill. It includes a diagram of Euclid's "windmill proof" of the Pythagorean theorem, a globe, and a sextant. It includes the motto "Universitas V. Montis. A.D. 1791" in the outer ring "Collegiumque Agriculturae" in the inner one, noting the establishment of the College of Agriculture in 1865.

== Academics ==
Offering over 100 undergraduate majors, the university comprises seven undergraduate colleges, an honors college, a graduate college, and a medical college. The University of Vermont is accredited by the New England Commission of Higher Education. Bachelors, masters, and doctoral programs are offered through the Robert Larner College of Medicine, the College of Agriculture and Life Sciences, the College of Arts and Sciences, the College of Education and Social Services, the College of Engineering and Mathematical Sciences, the College of Nursing and Health Sciences, the Graduate College, the Grossman School of Business, and the Rubenstein School of Environment and Natural Resources. The Patrick Leahy Honors College does not confer its own degrees; instead, students concurrently enroll in one of the university's seven undergraduate colleges.

=== Rankings and reputation ===
Academic rankings

National
- Forbes: 181
- U.S. News & World Report: 121
- Washington Monthly: 100
- WSJ/College Pulse: 283

Global
- ARWU: 401–500
- QS: 851-900
- U.S. News & World Report: 510

As of 2024, U.S. News & World Report's annual university rankings place UVM as tied for 61st among public universities and tied for 121st nationally.

In 2024, Forbes' America's Top Colleges list ranked UVM 181st overall out of 500 private and public colleges and universities in America, and also ranks it 79th among public universities and 129th among research universities.

The university was named a Public Ivy by Richard Moll in his 1985 book The Public Ivies: A Guide to America's Best Public Undergraduate Colleges and Universities.

=== Undergraduate admissions ===
Undergraduate admissions statistics
- 2023 entering class
- Admit rate: 60.0% ( +0.2)
- Yield rate: 17.1% ( +0.5)

Test scores middle 50%^{[i]}
- SAT Total: 1270-1410 (among 35% of FTFs)
- SAT EBRW: 640-720
- SAT Math: 610-700
- ACT Composite: 29-32 (among 11% of FTFs)

High school GPA^{[ii]}
- Top 10%: 41.38%
- Top 25%: 75.42%
- Top 50%: 97.32%
- Average: 3.85

Undergraduate admissions are classified as "more selective", indicating that test score data for first-year students is in the 80th to 100th percentile of selectivity among all baccalaureate institutions.

For the class of 2026, UVM received 28,236 applications, accepting 16,947 (60.0%). Of those accepted, 2,896 enrolled, a yield rate of 17.1%. UVM's first-year retention rate is 88.25%, with 77.5% graduating within six years.

Of the 35% of the incoming first-year class who submitted SAT scores; the middle 50% composite scores were 1270-1410. Of the 11% of enrolled first-years in 2023 who submitted ACT scores; the middle 50% composite scores were between 29 and 32. The average high school GPA was 3.85.

=== Research ===
UVM is classified among "R1: Doctoral Universities—Very high research activity". For the 2025 fiscal year, UVM attracted $266 million in research and development funding.

=== College of Arts and Sciences ===
The College of Arts and Sciences is the largest college, with the greatest number of students, faculty, and staff. The college also offers the bulk of the foundational courses to help ensure that students all over campus have the tools to succeed in all academic endeavors. It offers 45 areas of study in the humanities, fine arts, formal sciences, social sciences, and natural sciences.

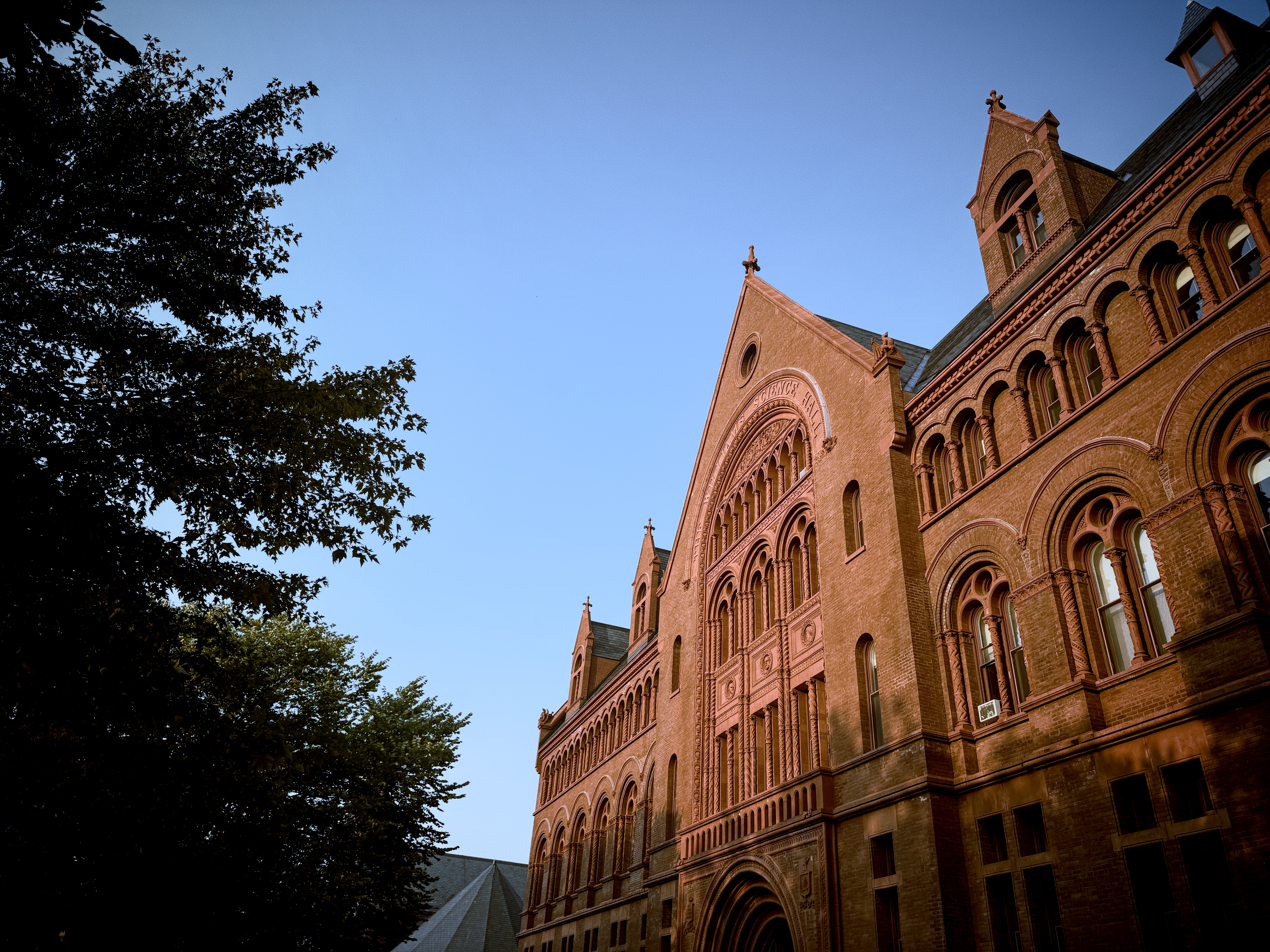
Williams Hall (formerly Williams Science Hall) at the University of Vermont today houses the departments of Art and Art History, Health and Society, and Anthropology.

=== Grossman School of Business ===
UVM's Grossman School of Business is accredited by AACSB and offers undergraduate and graduate programs. In 2015, the school was renamed Grossman School of Business in honor of a $20 million gift from alumnus Steven Grossman, the largest single gift in the university's history. The school has an undergraduate body of over 1,100 students, who receive a Bachelor of Science in Business Administration.

In 2025, Corporate Knights ranked the school's Sustainable Innovation MBA (SI-MBA) as the 2nd best Better World MBA program globally and the top program in the United States for social and environmental impact. The program has held these rankings since 2023.

According to The Princeton Review, the SI-MBA program is also ranked as the 2nd best Green MBA in the United States, a top 50 program for Entrepreneurship, and one of the top seven Entrepreneurship programs in the Northeastern United states.

=== College of Engineering and Mathematical Sciences ===
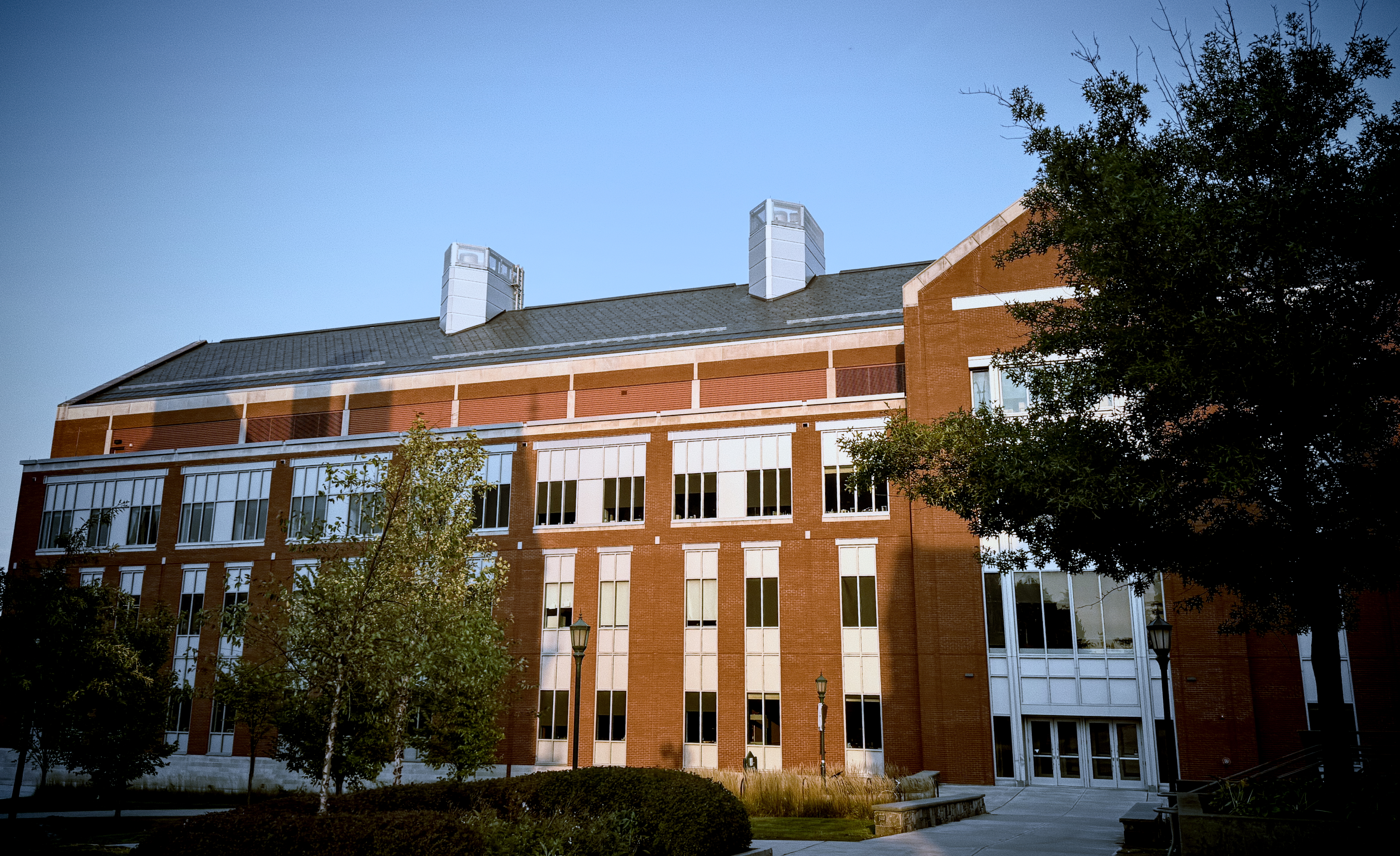
Discovery Hall, which houses physical science disciplines, like biochemistry, physics and chemistry

CEMS is home to five ABET-accredited engineering programs—Biomedical, Civil, Environmental, Electrical and Mechanical Engineering—in addition to the Department of Computer Science and the Department of Mathematics and Statistics. It also features three research centers: the Transportation Research Center, the Complex Systems Center and the Vermont Advanced Computing Center. The college has about 1400 undergraduate students, 250 graduate students, and 85 faculty members.

=== College of Agriculture and Life Sciences ===
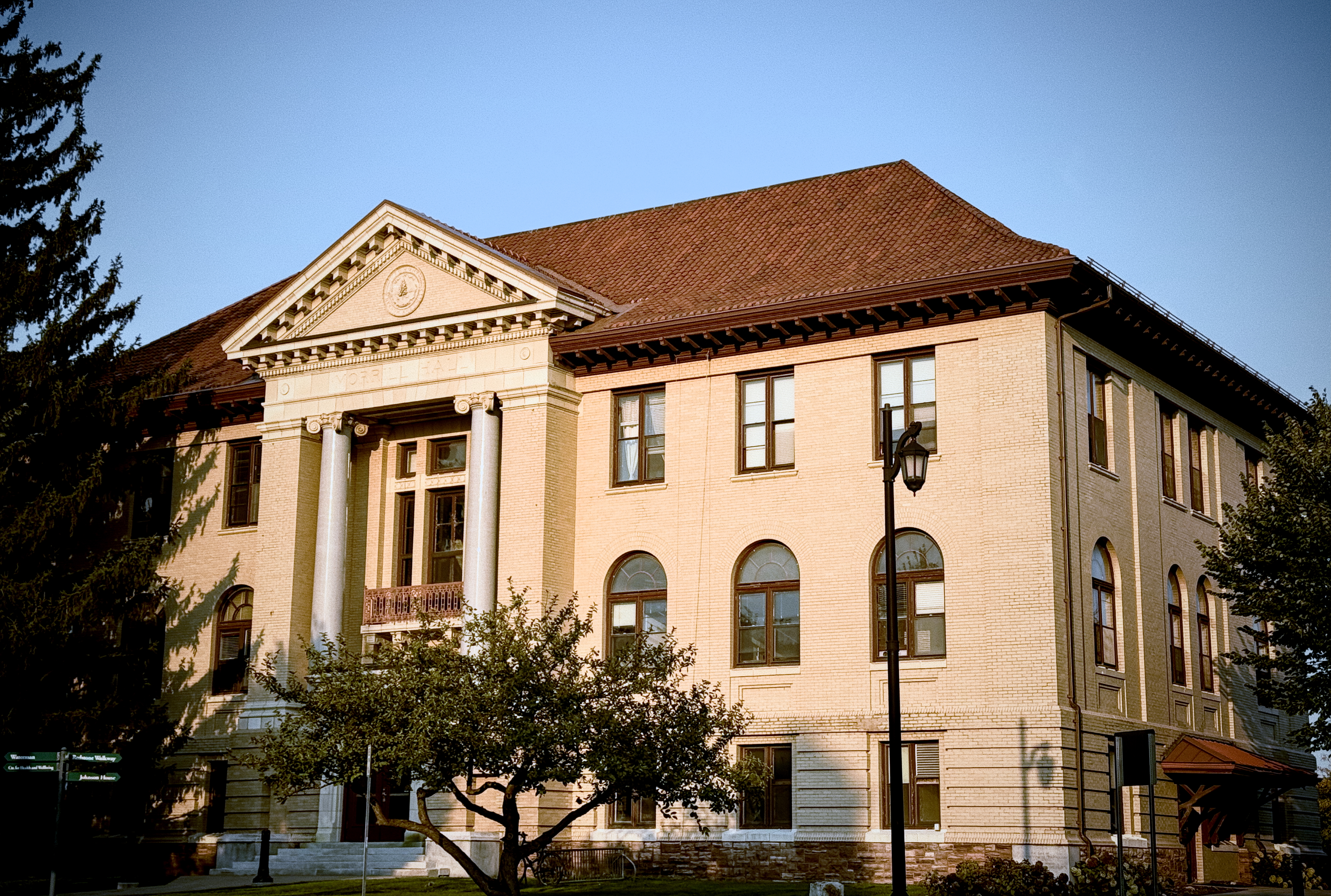
Named after U.S. Senator Justin Smith Morrill, Morrill Hall was constructed in 1906–07 to serve as the home of the UVM Agriculture Department and Agricultural Experiment Station.

The College of Agriculture and Life Sciences (CALS) offers programs in animal science (early admission to the Cummings School of Veterinary Medicine at Tufts University is available); biochemistry; biological science; community entrepreneurship; community and international development; dietetics, nutrition and food sciences; ecological agriculture; environmental science; environmental studies; microbiology; molecular genetics; plant biology; public communication; and sustainable landscape horticulture. The college is also home to the Center for Rural Studies.

The college also offers programs in conjunction with the college of arts and sciences. Students who choose these majors, such as Biological Sciences, can choose between either college.

As a land-grant college, UVM receives an annual grant under the Cooperative State Research, Education, and Extension Service to provide agricultural research services to the state of Vermont.

=== College of Education and Social Services ===
UVM's College of Education and Social Services (CESS) offers degrees in teacher education, human development & family science, and social work. Minors are also available in American Sign Language, special education, and education for cultural and linguistic diversity. The college comprises the Department of Leadership and Developmental Sciences, Department of Education, Department of Social Work, and the Center on Disability and Community Inclusion. Studies leading to a master's degree or doctorate (Ed.D. or Ph.D.) also are offered.

UVM research vessel docked near ECHO Aquarium, in Burlington harbor along Lake Champlain

=== College of Medicine ===
In 1804, John Pomeroy began teaching students in his house in Burlington, as the first medical department at a state college or university. In 1822, the College of Medicine was established as the seventh medical school in the United States, founded by Pomeroy and the medical educator Nathan Smith.

UVM enrolls approximately 100 medical students in each class; there are approximately 400 medical students. The University of Vermont Medical Center is the primary site of clinical education.

The College of Medicine currently ranks tied for 29th for overall quality in primary care training among the country's 89 programs ranked by U.S. News & World Report for 2016 and 43rd out of 120 in 2019.

On October 21, 2016, Joe Biden visited the university campus to discuss Cancer Moonshot.

==== Charles A. Dana Medical Library ====
The Charles A. Dana Library, is the largest medical library in Vermont and serves as the Vermont Resource Library of the National Network of Libraries of Medicine, providing for information needs of the Academic Health Center at the University of Vermont. The Academic Health Center is composed of the faculty, staff and students at UVM's College of Medicine and the College of Nursing and Health Sciences, as well as the physicians, and other health care providers at the University of Vermont Medical Center. The library also meets the health sciences information needs of the university's undergraduate and graduate programs and is open to the residents of the state of Vermont with health sciences information questions.

=== College of Nursing and Health Sciences ===
The College of Nursing and Health Sciences at UVM comprises four departments: Biomedical and Health Sciences, Communication Sciences and Disorders, Nursing, and Rehabilitation and Movement Science, as well as the Institute of Integrative Health, a shared program with the Robert Larner College of Medicine offering a Certificate in Integrative Healthcare.Some of these undergraduate degrees prepare students to enter graduate degree programs for Speech-Language Pathology, Audiology, or a doctorate of physical therapy program. The college also utilizes clinical facilities at the UVM Medical Center (formerly known as Fletcher Allen Health Care).

=== The Patrick Leahy Honors College ===
The Patrick Leahy Honors College sponsors opportunities for students to participate in co-curricular programs and extracurricular activities — special symposia, dinners with visiting scholars, and trips to museums and theaters in Montreal and Boston.

Faculty are selected from throughout the university to participate in the college as lecturers in a first-year ethics course and advanced seminars, as participants in reading groups, as speakers at the Plenary Lecture Series, and as mentors to honors students conducting research.

Through a required ethics course, small seminars, informal gatherings, and special research projects, students work alongside scholars from a section of the university's academic disciplines in the humanities, the sciences, engineering, nursing, medicine, education, business and more.

In May 2023, the college was renamed in honor of former U.S. senator Patrick Leahy.

=== Rubenstein School of Environment and Natural Resources ===
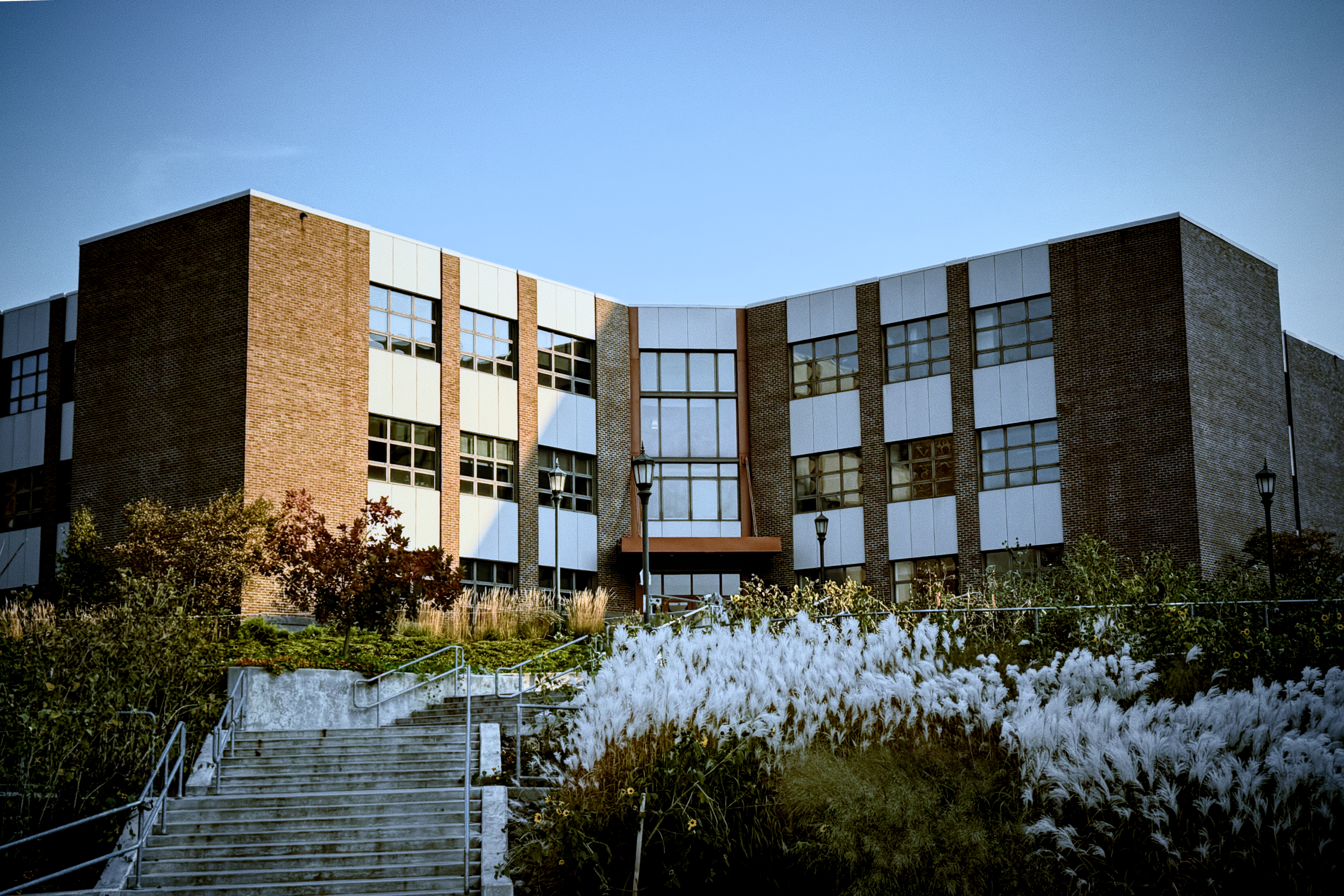
The George D. Aiken Center houses the Rubenstein School of Environment & Natural Resources.

From its origins in the School of Natural Resources (originally established in 1973), the Rubenstein School of Environment and Natural Resources (RSENR) was created in 2003. The Rubenstein School of Environment and Natural Resources seeks to cultivate an appreciation and understanding of ecological and social processes as well as values that are aimed at maintaining the integrity of natural systems and achieving a sustainable human community in harmony with the natural environment. The Rubenstein School targets three general areas of emphasis for scholarly pursuit: 1. Applied Ecology; 2. Environment & Society; and 3. Development & Use of Innovative Tools (e.g. GIS, spatial analysis, and modeling).

The main building hosting RSENR is located at the George D. Aiken Center, which was renovated in 2012 and received a U.S. Green Building Council LEED Platinum certification.

In 2007, the university won a $6.7 million grant to research the pollution problems of Lake Champlain.

== Athletics ==
The athletic teams at UVM are known as the Catamounts. The university offers 18 varsity sports. Women's teams include basketball, cross country, field hockey, ice hockey, lacrosse, skiing, soccer, swimming and diving, and track and field (indoor and outdoor). Men's teams include basketball, cross country, ice hockey, lacrosse, skiing, soccer, and track and field (indoor and outdoor). All teams compete at the NCAA Division I level. Most teams compete in the America East Conference. Men's and women's hockey teams compete in the Hockey East Association. The alpine and Nordic ski teams compete in the Eastern Intercollegiate Ski Association.

UVM's athletic teams won seven straight America East Academic Cups (2005, 2006, 2007, 2008, 2009, 2010, and 2011) for the best overall combined GPA among its student-athletes. UVM is the first school in the America East Conference to win three straight years and four times overall.

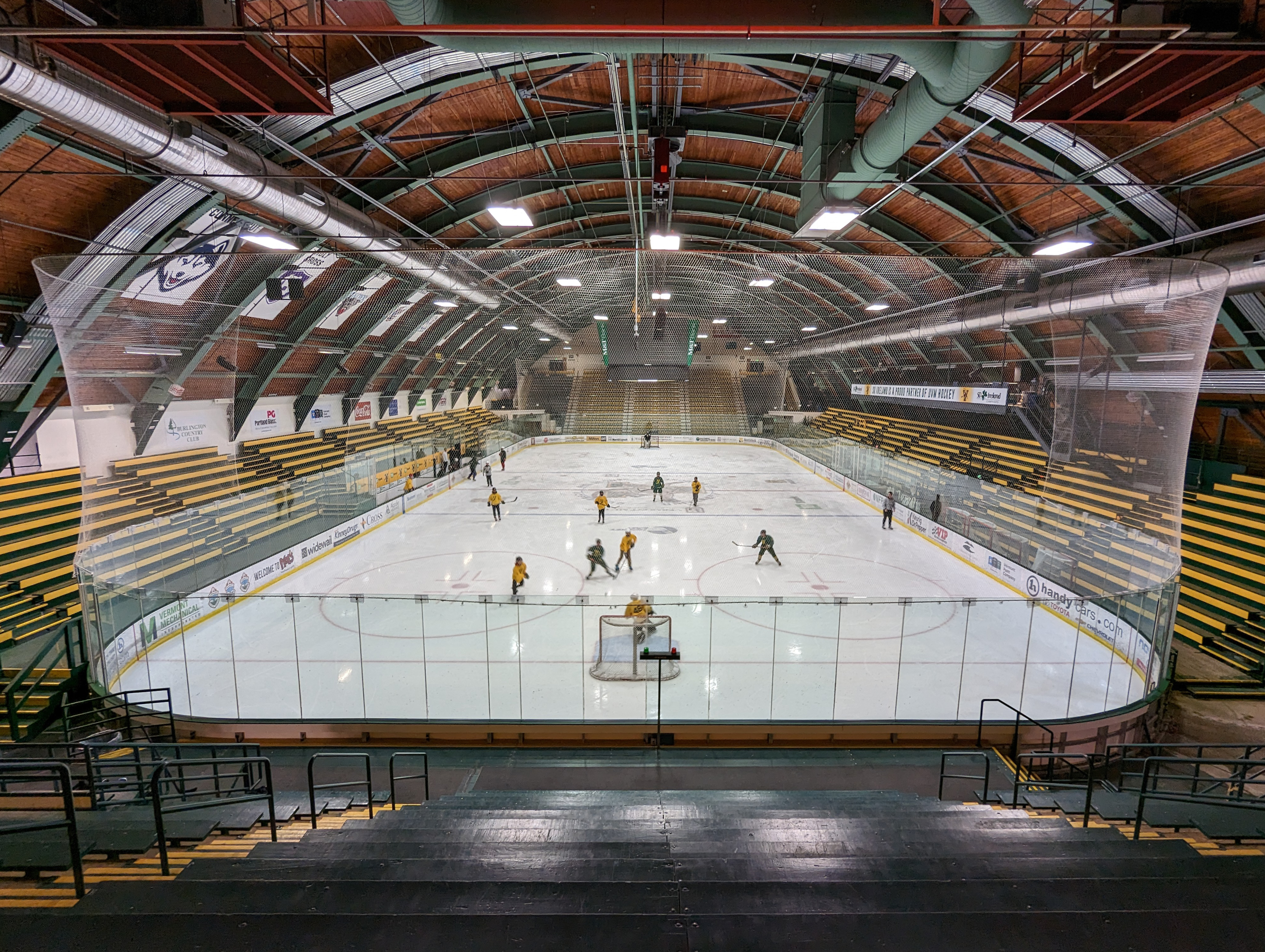
Gutterson Fieldhouse, built in 1963, houses UVM's hockey rink.

Highlights of recent varsity athletic seasons include the men's hockey teams trip to the Frozen Four in 2009; the women's and men's basketball teams advancing to the 2010 NCAA Tournament following America East Tournament titles; the ski team winning its sixth NCAA National Championship in 2012 in Bozeman, Montana; in 2014, the men's hockey team earned its third trip to the NCAA Tournament since 2009 and the men's basketball team won the America East Regular Season title for the sixth time. The university has discontinued several major sports programs in its history, including football, softball and baseball. The softball and baseball programs were eliminated in 2009.

Thirty-six former UVM athletes have competed in 16 Olympic Games (13 winter, 3 summer) and combined have won six Olympic medals.

The UVM fight song was written in 1938 and is entitled "Vermont Victorious."

=== 2024 NCAA Men's Soccer Championship ===
On December 16, 2024, the UVM men's soccer team defeated the Marshall University to win the 2024 NCAA Division I men's soccer tournament. This is the first championship appearance and win by any UVM Division I sports team. It was also the first national championship for any America East team in history.

=== Club sports ===
UVM sponsors many club sports teams. The UVM sailing team was competitively ranked 8th in the nation as of November 15, 2009. UVM crew competes in the Head of the Charles Regatta and Dad Vail Regatta, winning bronze for the men's coxed four in the 2015 ACRA national club rowing championship. The cycling team competes against other collegiate varsity teams and has won multiple national titles.

== Arts ==
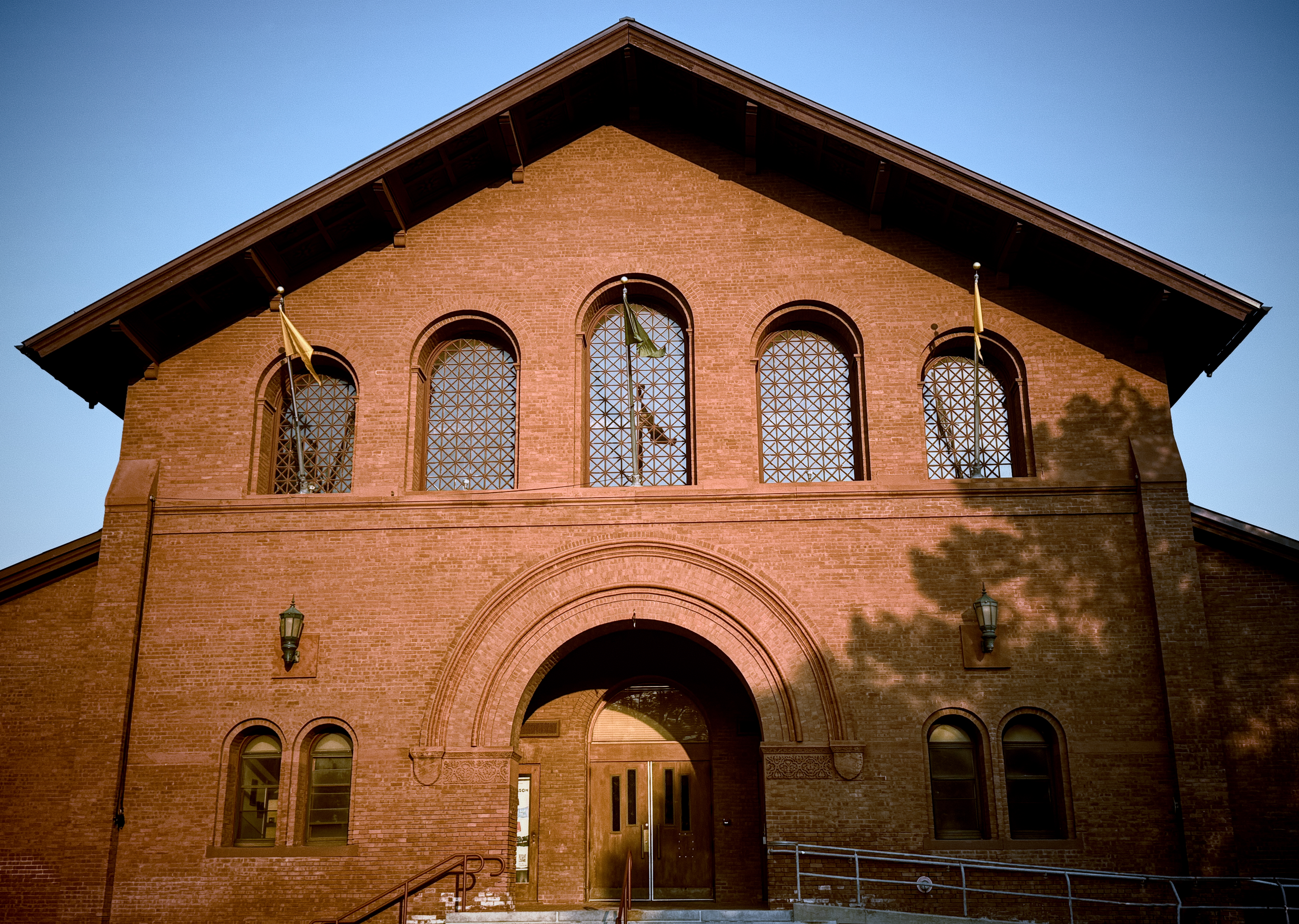
Royall Tyler Theatre, which houses the Department of Theatre.

UVM's School of the Arts sponsors instrumental and choral performances throughout the year. The Royall Tyler Theatre presents theatre productions on its mainstage. In addition to the Department of Theatre's approximately three mainstage shows each year, a group of student-directed one acts are also performed.

Notable mainstage shows in recent years have included Straight White Men and Bat Boy: The Musical (2022/2023); It's a Wonderful Life and She Kills Monsters (2021/2022); An Enemy of the People (2020/2021); The Wolves and The Normal Heart (2019/2020); Pippin (2018/2019); Sense and Sensibility and Peter and The Starcatcher (2017/2018); Spring Awakening (2016/2017); The 39 Steps and Noises Off (2015/2016); Much Ado About Nothing (2014/2015); The Mousetrap and Urinetown (2013/2014). From 1991-2018, the Theatre performed The Toys Take Over Christmas, a holiday tradition in Burlington.

The Lane Series, the university's public performing arts program, began in 1955. Presenting nationally and internationally-known artists, the series offers twenty-five events per academic year, including performances in classical, jazz, folk, chamber, and choral music, as well as theater, film, and dance. Most events are held at the UVM Recital Hall on the Redstone Campus.

The Fleming Museum of Art is the university's museum. Its permanent collection of 24,000 objects includes works of art as well as anthropological and ethnographic artifacts. The museum also features various visiting exhibits and special events.

The Vermont Mozart Festival, now defunct, developed at UVM, and its first festivals also were held at UVM. The festival was incorporated as an independent nonprofit organization in 1976 but retained ties to UVM throughout its existence.

== Student life ==
Undergraduate demographics as of Fall 2023
Race and ethnicity	Total
White	84%
Hispanic	5%
Two or more races	4%
Asian	3%
Unknown	3%
Black	1%
International student	1%
Economic diversity
Low-income (Note: The percentage of students who received an income-based federal Pell grant intended for low-income students.)	14%
Affluent (Note: The percentage of students who are a part of the American middle class at the bare minimum.)	86%

Student clubs and organizations, totaling more than 250, span student interests and receive sponsorship from the Student Government Association. Clubs with longstanding history and the largest memberships include: Volunteers in Action, the UVM Outing Club, Ski & Snowboard Club. Hillel also has a strong presence on the UVM campus. UVM also is home to the oldest continually-active FeelGood chapter in the nation, started in 2007, with the chapter raising over $400,000 since its inception for the end of extreme poverty by 2030 through on-campus grilled cheese delis.

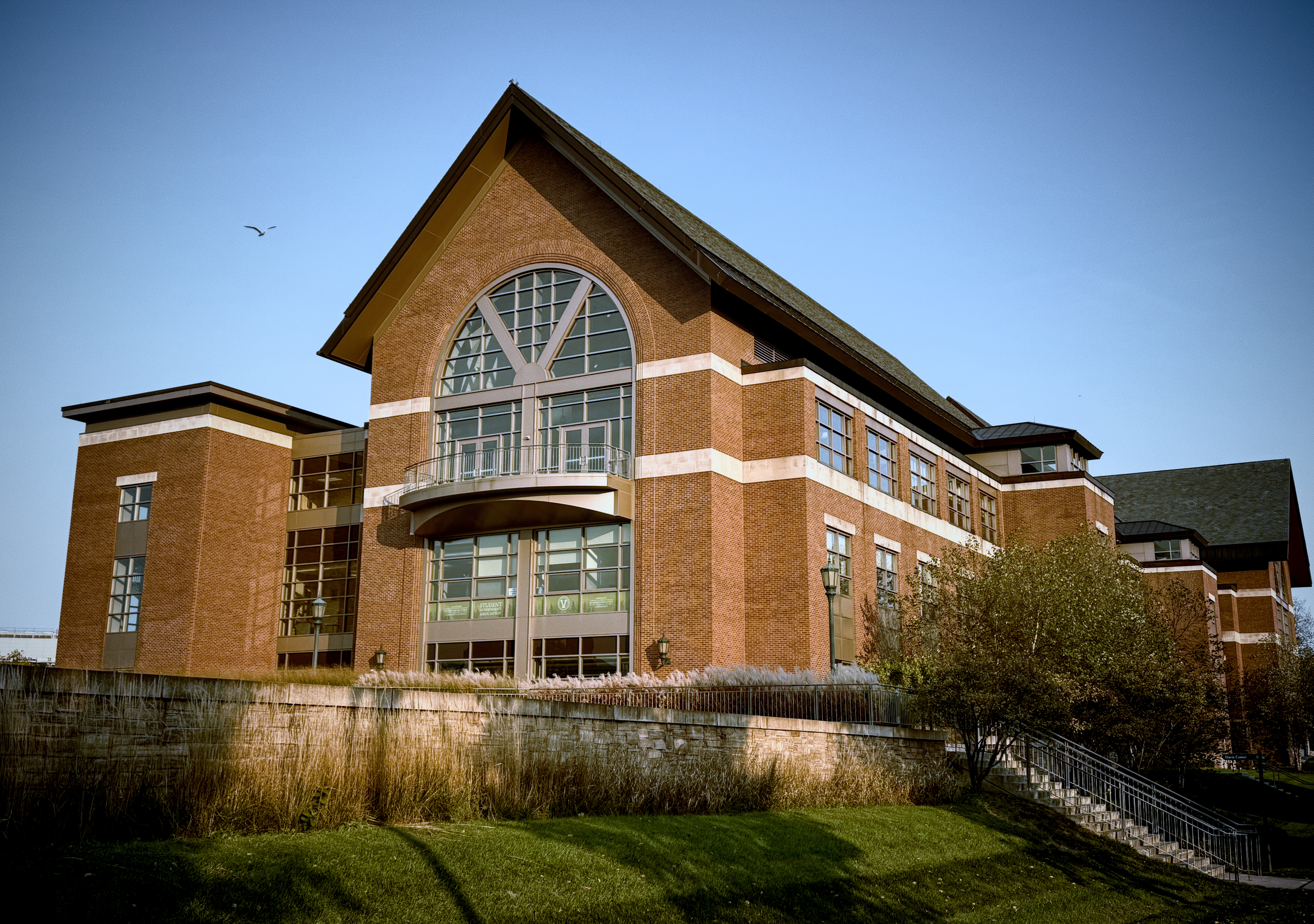
The Davis Center, the student center of the university completed in the fall of 2007

In 2015, the university launched a wellness program called the Wellness Environment (WE) a substance-free residential program that gives interested students access to fitness and nutrition coaches, has daily yoga instruction, round-the-clock meditation sessions, and a mentorship program that pairs them with a Burlington youth. In the fall of 2017, the Central Campus Residence Hall completed construction, and now houses nearly 700 residents in the Wellness Environment.

Thanks to an organization known as GIRT, or Gender Inclusive Restroom Taskforce, the University of Vermont has a growing number of single-occupancy, gender-neutral bathrooms for use by non-binary and gender non-conforming students, faculty, and visitors.

=== Outing Club ===
The UVM Outing Club was established in 1913 and is the largest outing club in the country. The club is student-run and offers kayaking, canoeing, hiking, backpacking, rock climbing, ice climbing, backcountry skiing, and Nordic skiing trips. The club has assisted with the formation of TREK, an outdoor pre-orientation student program that takes incoming freshman on 5 day excursions to connect them to the UVM community and the State of Vermont. Annually, the club runs the Catamountain Classic event, in which participants hike all 272 miles of the Long Trail in one weekend.

=== Events ===
UVM Program Board (UPB) is responsible for bringing campus events and activities to the UVM community. In recent years, UPB has organized events like the annual SpringFest featuring comedian Michelle Wolf, Two Door Cinema Club and Laverne Cox. It also runs battles of the bands, weekly pub quiz tournaments, and international film and food events.

=== Concerts ===
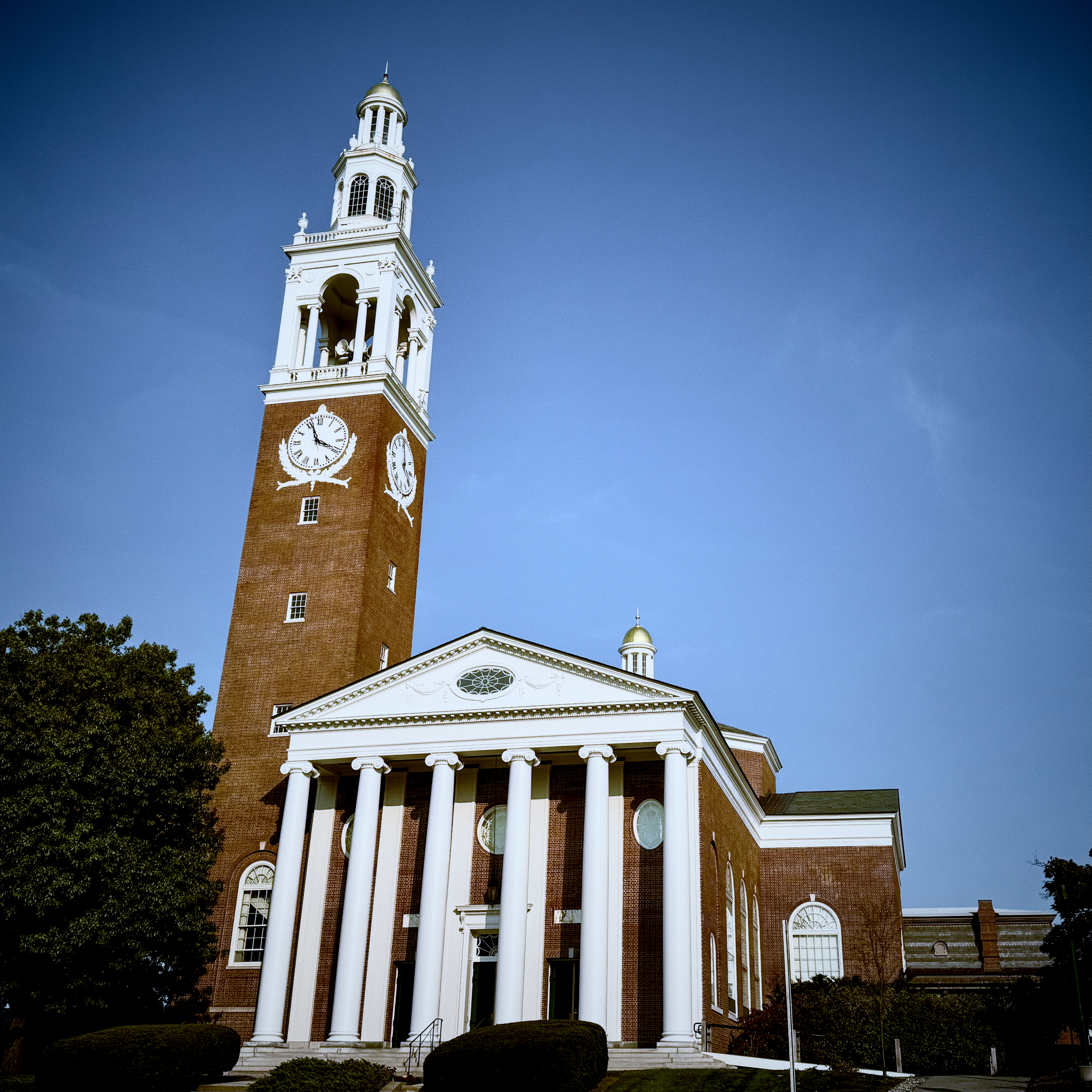
Ira Allen Chapel

In addition to campus events, UPB organizes live musical entertainment event featuring acts from across the country as well as local bands. UPB is composed of four committees, one of which is a concerts committee. The concerts committee learns about various aspects of the music industry by putting on shows and working with local sound and production professionals. Students are in charge of choosing and booking bands and are responsible for all production aspects on the day of the show.

The Concert Bureau was established in 1971, inviting artists such as R.E.M., Phish (three of its four members attended UVM in the 1980s), Red Hot Chili Peppers, Sting, Lou Reed, Primus, The String Cheese Incident, James Brown, Bob Dylan, The Allman Brothers Band, Death Cab for Cutie, Jurassic 5, the Disco Biscuits, The Grateful Dead, Guster, and The Flaming Lips.

Since 2001, the annual SpringFest is held in April. Headliners have included Vida Blue, The Roots, Cake, Keller Williams, Gov't Mule, co-headliners Robert Randolph & the Family Band, Ziggy Marley, and Talib Kweli. Other acts to perform at various SpringFests have included The Meditations, Toots & the Maytals, Soulive, Rjd2, Apollo Sunshine, Ratatat in 2009, MSTRKRFT in 2010, The Roots and Thievery Corporation in 2011, Dillon Francis in 2012, MGMT in 2013, Atmosphere in 2014, The Disco Biscuits in 2015, The Head and the Heart in 2016, Two Door Cinema Club in 2017, and Playboi Carti in 2018.

=== Greek life ===
The University of Vermont Greek community is one of the oldest in the nation, with the first fraternal organization starting in 1836. 5% of male students and 5% of female students join Greek life. Fraternity and sorority members become involved in Student Government Association (SGA) and work as Orientation Leaders, advocates, and Residence Assistants.

== Sustainability ==
The University of Vermont has a long history of environmental sustainability on its campus. In 2024, The Princeton Review placed UVM in 16th place among the "Top 50 Green Colleges" in the country.

=== 1990s ===
In 1995, the Environmental Council at UVM was established to fill a gap regarding a bridge between operations and academics on campus greening issues. The council's first project was to hear presentations from the various environmental programs on campus to provide a baseline scan of campus operation environmental impact. Greening UVM was published in 1998 by the council to establish a baseline on the environmental impact of the campus' operations. During the same year, a recycled paper policy was created and was implemented in 1999. As a community stakeholder in the Lab-XL project, the Environmental Council received an EPA grant to support the Tracking UVM project and publication to assess the relative environmental impact and community interest in laboratory chemical waste. Tracking UVM, a follow-up to the Greening UVM report, was published in 2002 and reported on the environmental progress of the university from 1990 to 2000. The University of Vermont's commitment to tracking its environmental performance was recognized in 2004 with Vermont's Governor's Award for Environmental Excellence for this 2002 environmental report card. Tracking UVM is one of the first report cards that track the environmental impact of campus operations in an institution of higher education.

=== 2000s ===
In 2005, UVM's President Daniel M. Fogel signed the institution's Green Building Policy. The recycled paper policy was updated in 2006 after two students pushed for the university to commit to purchasing 100% post-consumer, chlorine-free paper for routine copying and printing.

In 2007, President Fogel signed on to the American College & University Presidents' Climate Commitment. In 2008, UVM dissolved the Environmental Council and established the Office of Sustainability that supports sustainability planning on campus, connects operations with academics, and tracks sustainability efforts.

=== 2010s ===
In 2011, UVM released its Climate Action Plan to the American College & University President's Climate Commitment. The Climate Action Plan focuses on the direct and indirect greenhouse gas emissions from the institution's operations. The target dates for UVM's Climate Action Plan were 2015 for 100% carbon neutral electricity (Scope 1) and 2020 for carbon neutral heating, cooling, and fleet (Scope 2). UVM aims to target the net zero emissions for its "Scope 3" sources by 2025.

In 2012, UVM became one of the first institutions nationwide to end the sale of bottled water on campus and mandate that one third of drinks offered in vending machines be healthy options. During the same year, UVM's Board of Trustees passed a resolution to earmark $13 million for the fund, making it the largest challenge to date. Harvard's $12 million green loan fund had been the largest. In March 2012, UVM became fifth school in the nation to sign the "Real Food Campus Commitment", pledging to purchase 20% "real food" by 2020. In April 2017, UVM announced it had surpassed this goal and set a new goal to source 25% "real food" by 2020.

The Certification for Sustainable Transportation (CST) was founded in 2012 to help improve economic, environmental, and energy efficiency within the passenger transportation sector. The CST is a direct outgrowth of work that began at the University of Vermont in 2005 and now houses the eRating certification, driver trainings, and an array of awareness and education programs. It is a nonprofit operating out of UVM's Extensions office.

In May 2015, UVM introduced a sustainability requirement for all undergraduates, allowing students to choose from pre-approved sustainability classes.

=== Present ===
In April 2023, the university committed to carbon neutrality by 2030. It would pursue investments in renewable energy, electrified buildings and vehicles, reduced vehicle fleets, and geothermal exploration.

== Lawrence Debate Union ==
The Lawrence Debate Union (LDU) has been UVM's official debate team since 1899. Competing in British parliamentary debate, policy debate, and social justice-oriented debate, it is one of the oldest organizations on campus, receiving funding from a private grant established in 1899. The LDU has sent students to international competitions, from Slovenia, Malaysia, and Thailand (2007) to Greece and South Africa. The school has also sent students to the World Universities Debating Championship held in Ireland, Turkey, Botswana, Manila, Berlin, and Chennai, breaking into elimination rounds in the 2011 World University Debating Championship. Debaters from the LDU have also regularly competed in tournaments hosted by Oxford University and Cambridge University, and in 2013 won the title of the Budapest IV and Vienna IV in consecutive tournaments. Domestically, the LDU has also won the title of Northeast Universities Debating Sweepstakes champion for four consecutive years. The program is currently ranked seventh in the top schools for British Parliamentary debate in the world, and is the third-ranked American university on the list, behind only Yale and Cornell. It encourages participation of all interested UVM students, and sponsors public debates at UVM and for the Burlington community. Alfred C. Snider, who coached the LDU for over thirty years, was one of the most decorated debate coaches in the world. He also coached the National Speech and Debate Organization's national high school debate team to compete in the world championships.

== Publications ==
- The Vermont Cynic, an award-winning, digital student newspaper
- The Water Tower, an alternative weekly student newspaper
- Vermont Quarterly, UVM's alumni magazine
- UVM Today, news from the Strategic Communications office
- Proverbium: Yearbook of International Proverb Scholarship

== Notable alumni ==
UVM alumni includes several Olympians, Fulbright Scholars, Truman Scholars, Goldwater Scholars, and a Nobel Peace Prize laureate.

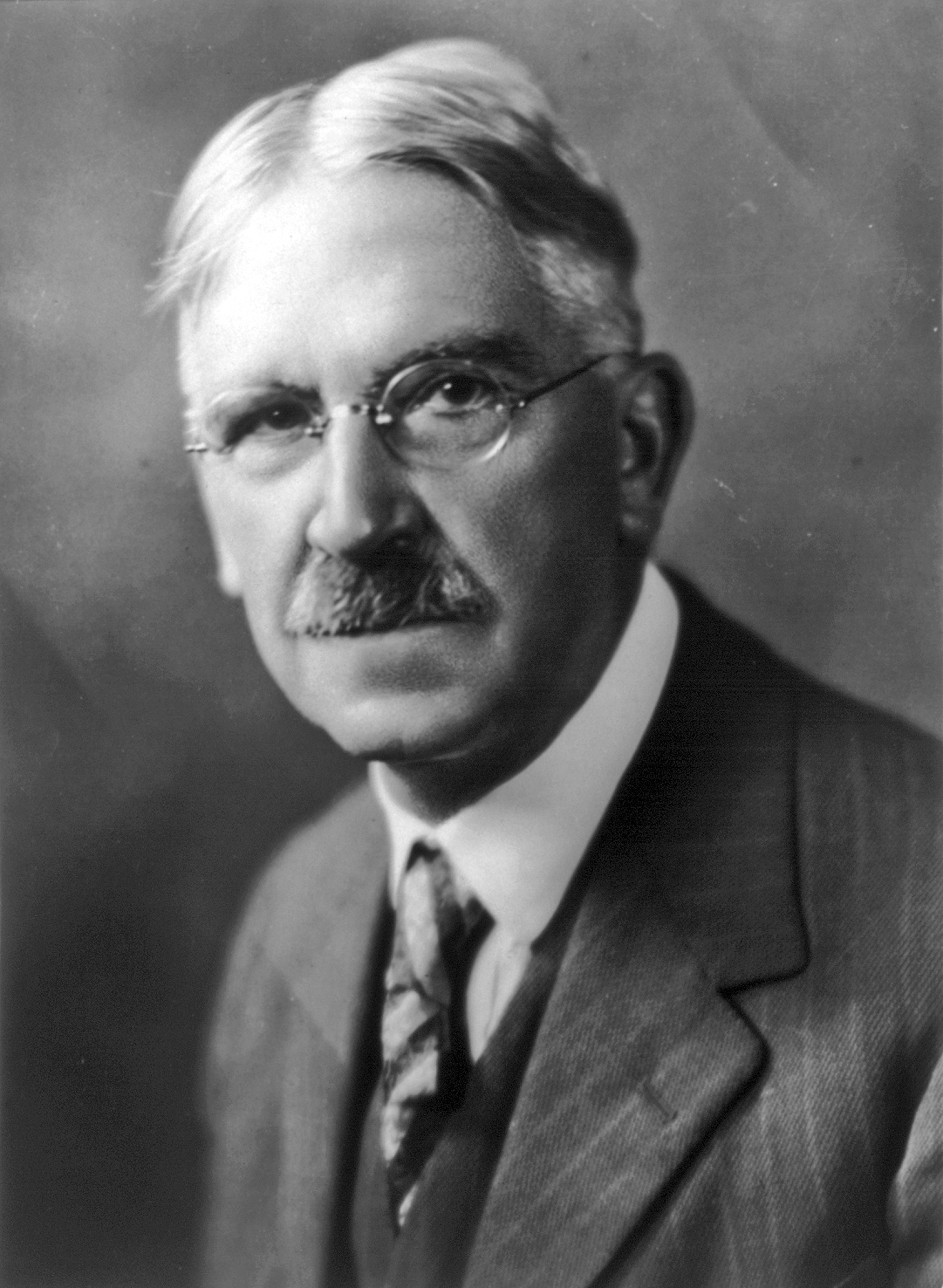
John Dewey
Philosopher, psychologist, and educational reformer
(BA)

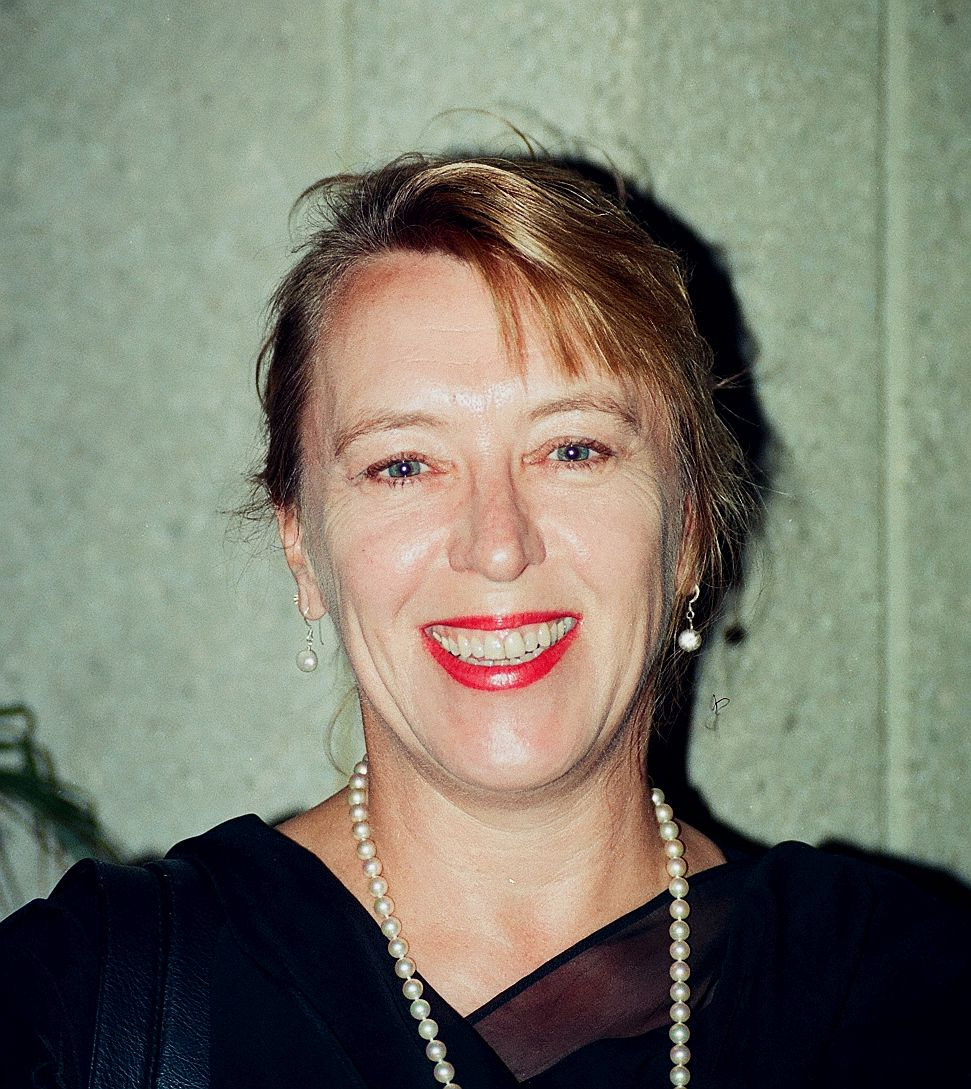
Jody Williams
Nobel Peace Prize laureate
(BA)

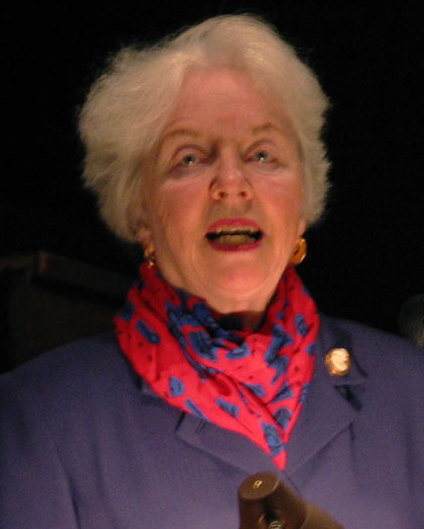
Madeleine Kunin
First female governor of Vermont and first female Jewish governor of a U.S. state, U.S. Ambassador to Switzerland
(MA)

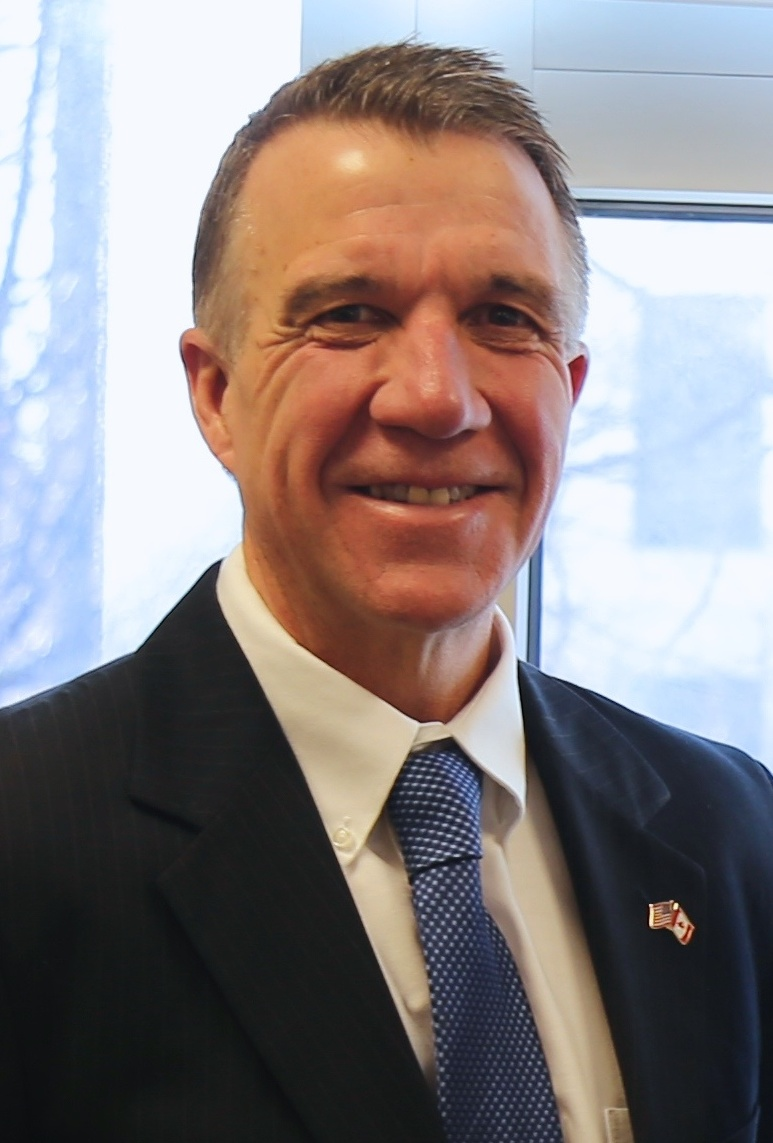
Phil Scott
82nd governor of Vermont
(BS)

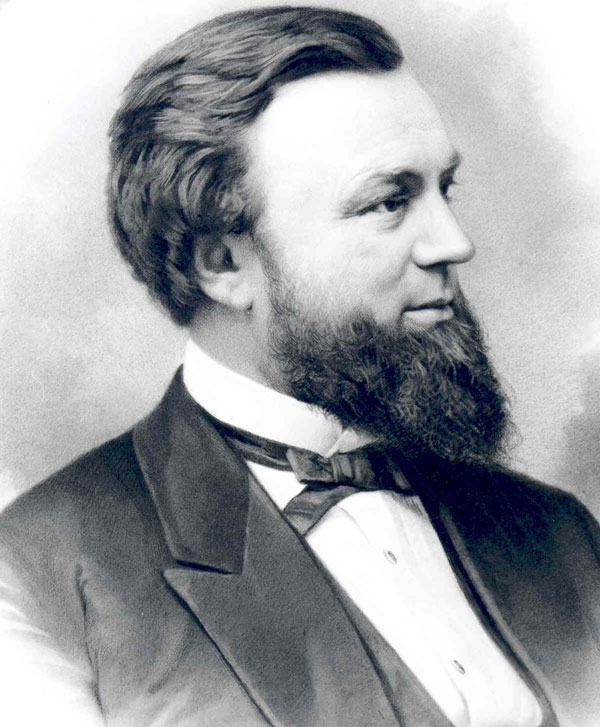
Frederick H. Billings
Lawyer, financier and president of the Northern Pacific Railway; benefactor of the Billings Library
(AM)

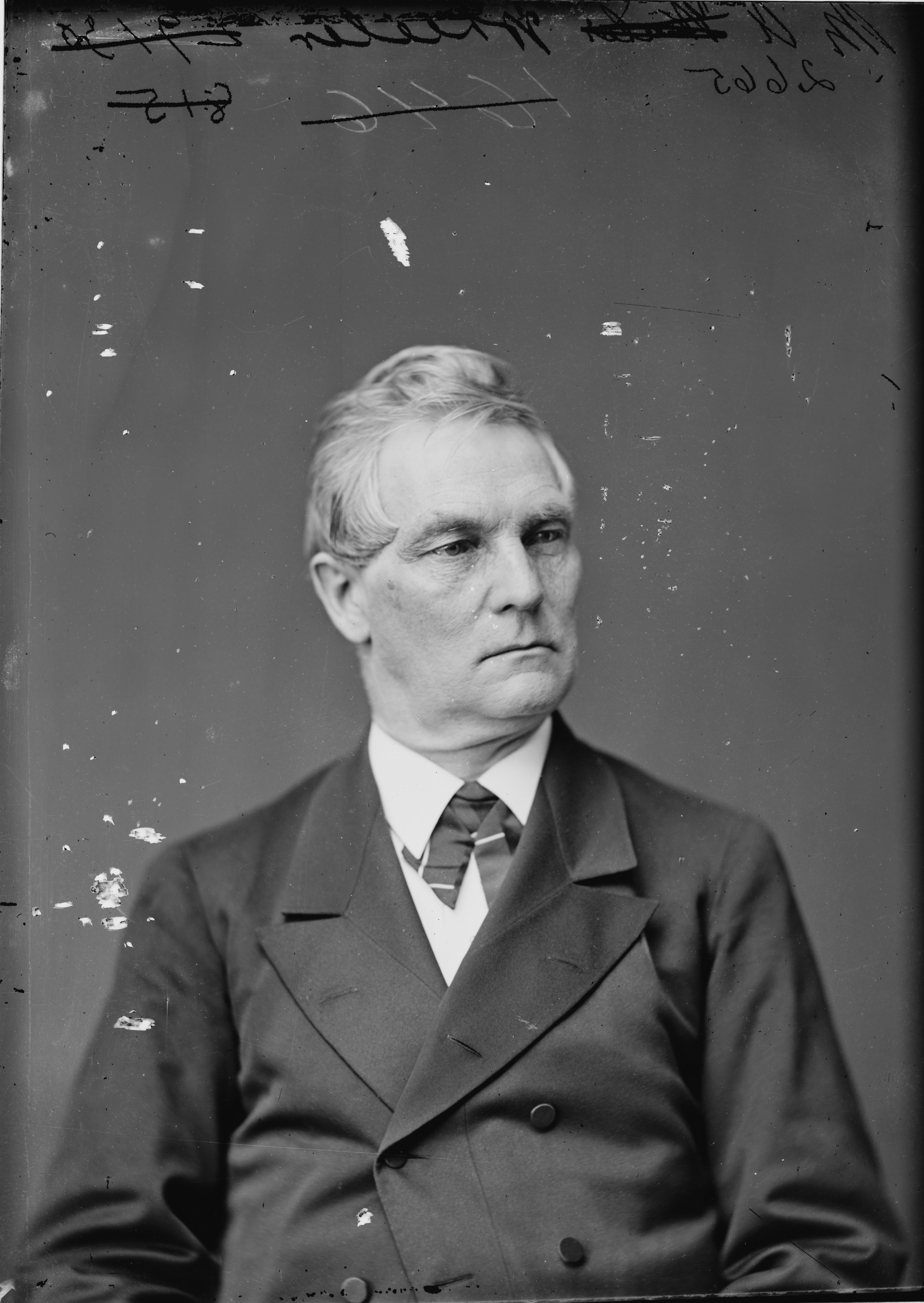
William A. Wheeler
19th vice president of the United States
(BA)

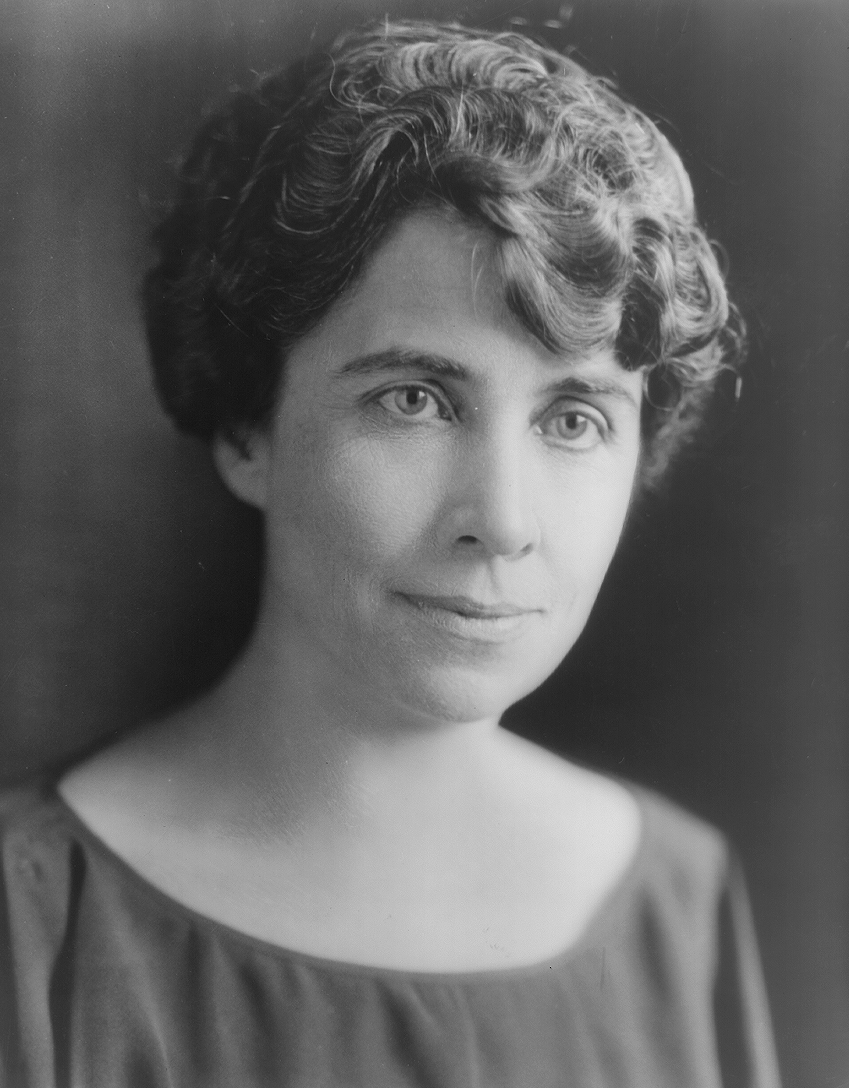
Grace Coolidge
First Lady of the United States
(BA)

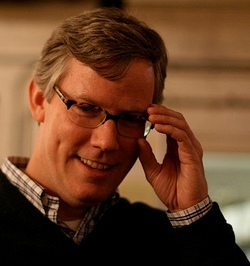
Brian Halligan
CEO of Hubspot
(BS)

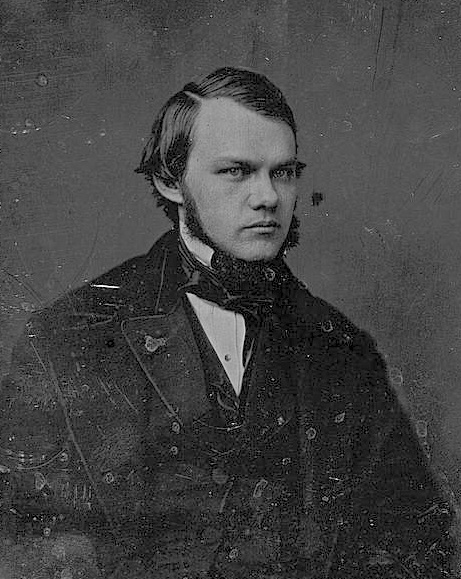
Henry Jarvis Raymond
Politician and co-founder of The New York Times
(BA)

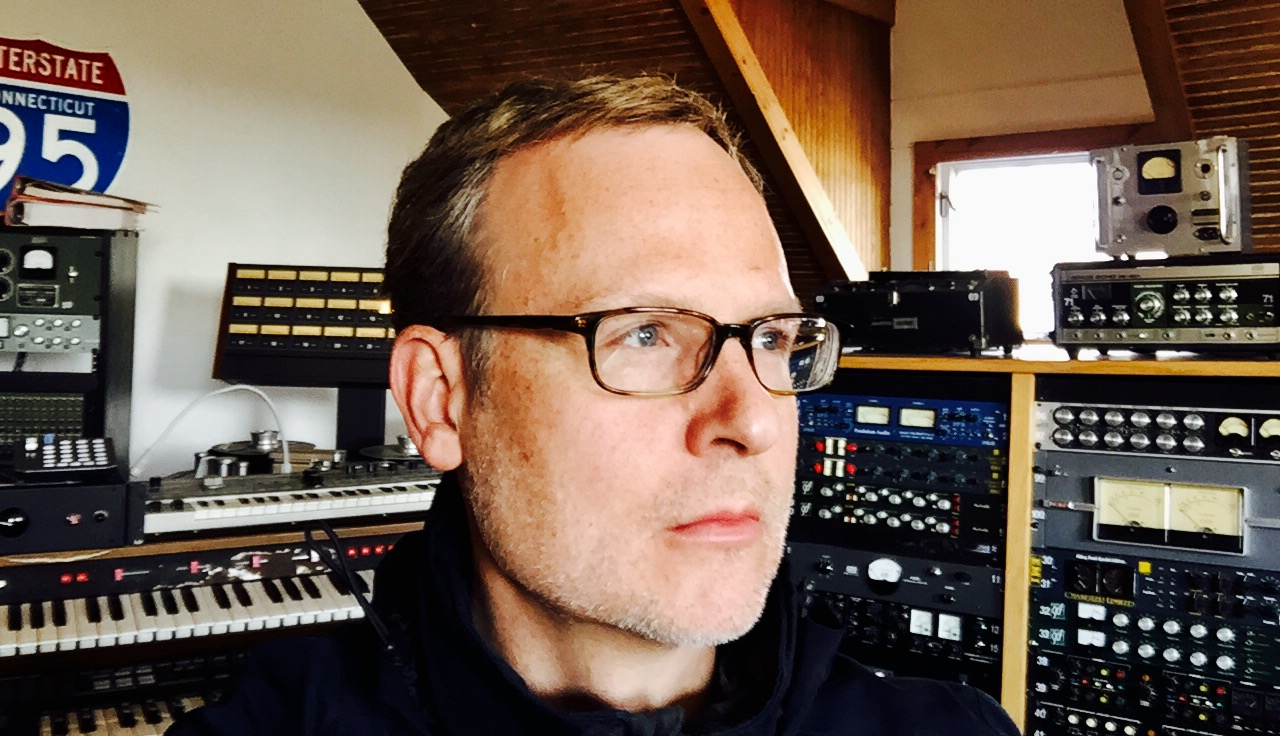
Peter Katis
Music producer/musician and Grammy Award winner
(BFA)

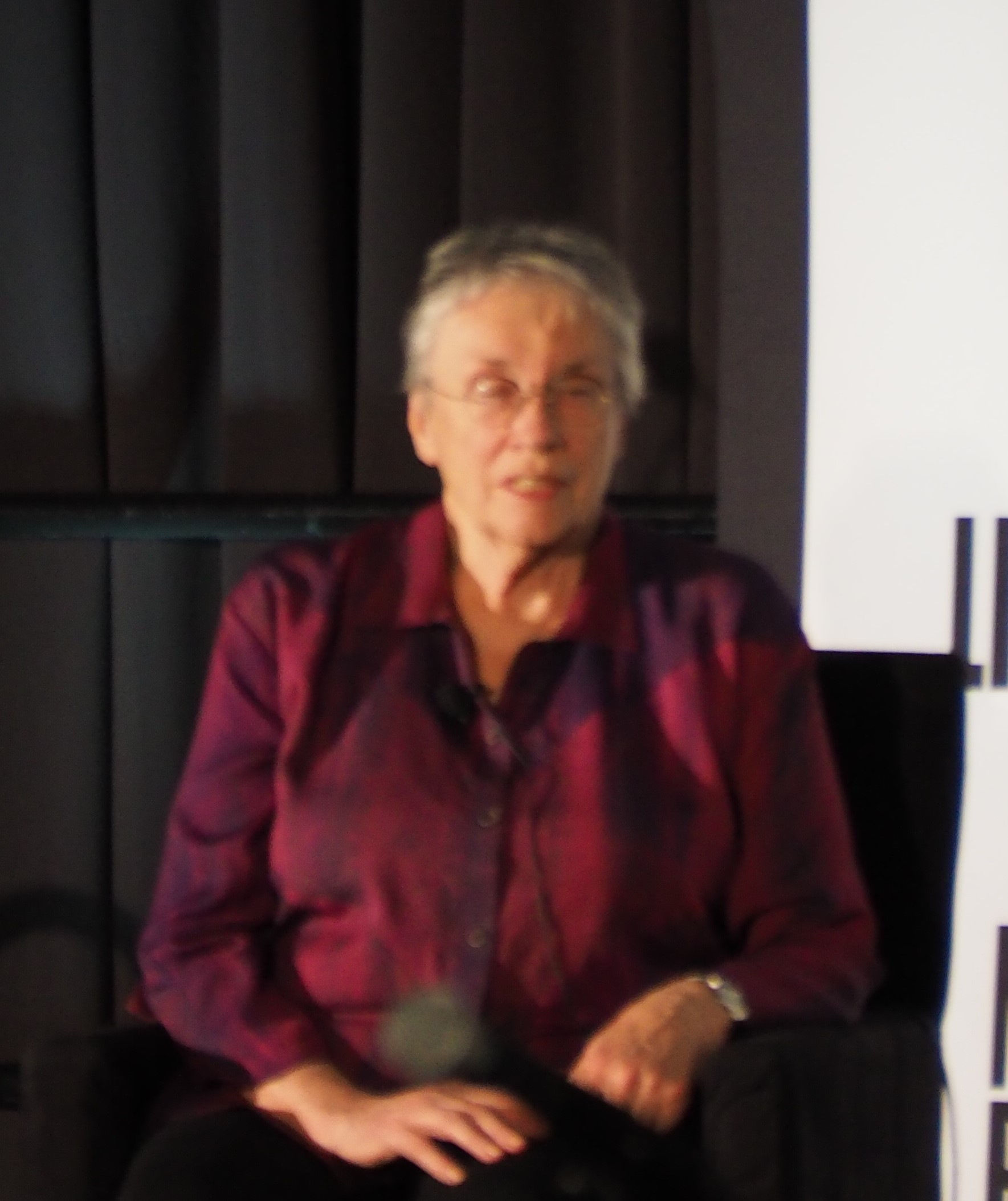
Annie Proulx
Pulitzer Prize-winning author of The Shipping News and Brokeback Mountain
(BA)

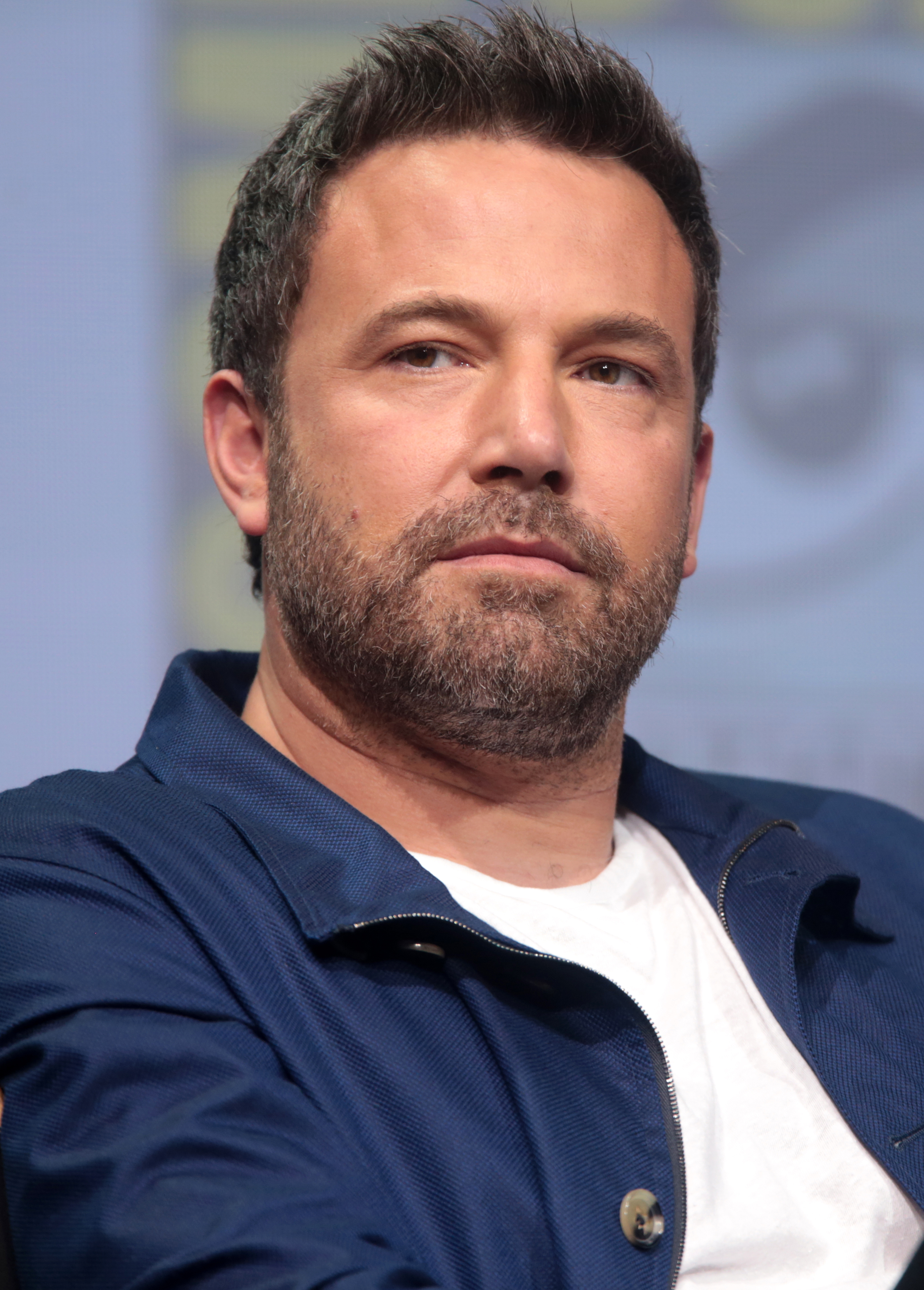
Ben Affleck
Actor and filmmaker, Academy Award-recipient
(transferred)

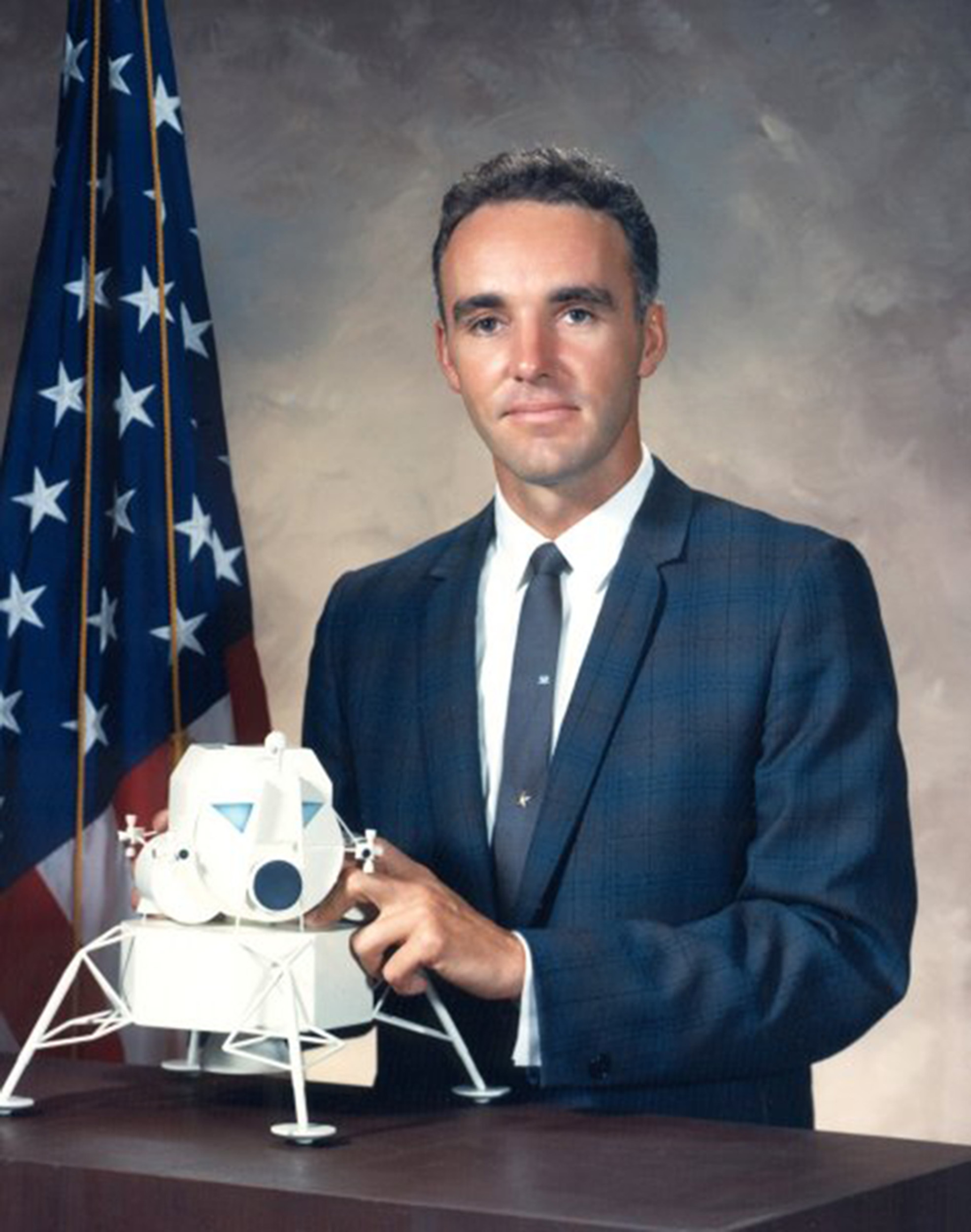
Duane Graveline
NASA astronaut
(BS)

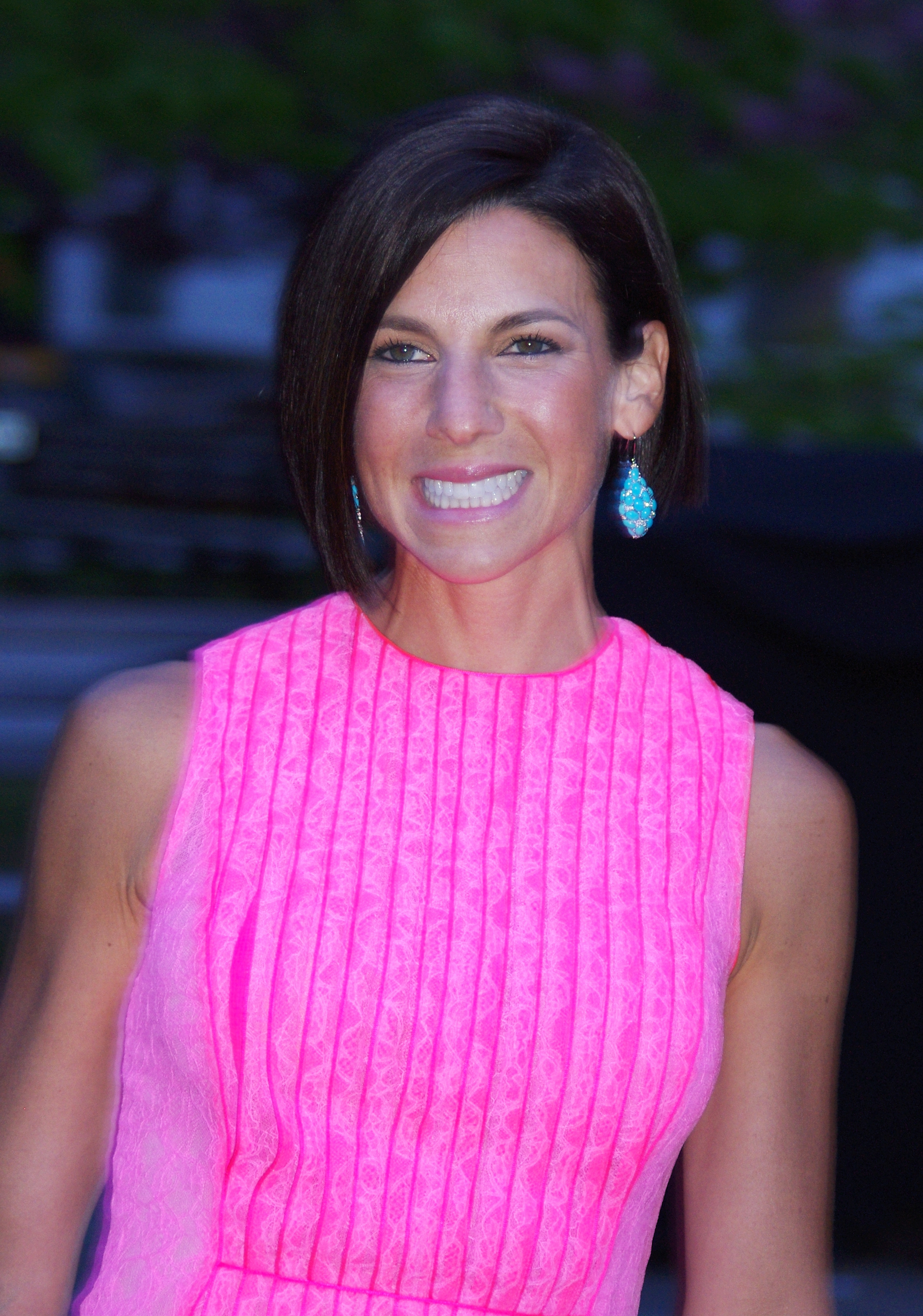
Jessica Seinfeld
Celebrity chef and cookbook author
(BA)
