= Coleshill, Buckinghamshire =

Village and civil parish in England

Coordinates: 51.647569°N 0.628943°W

Coleshill
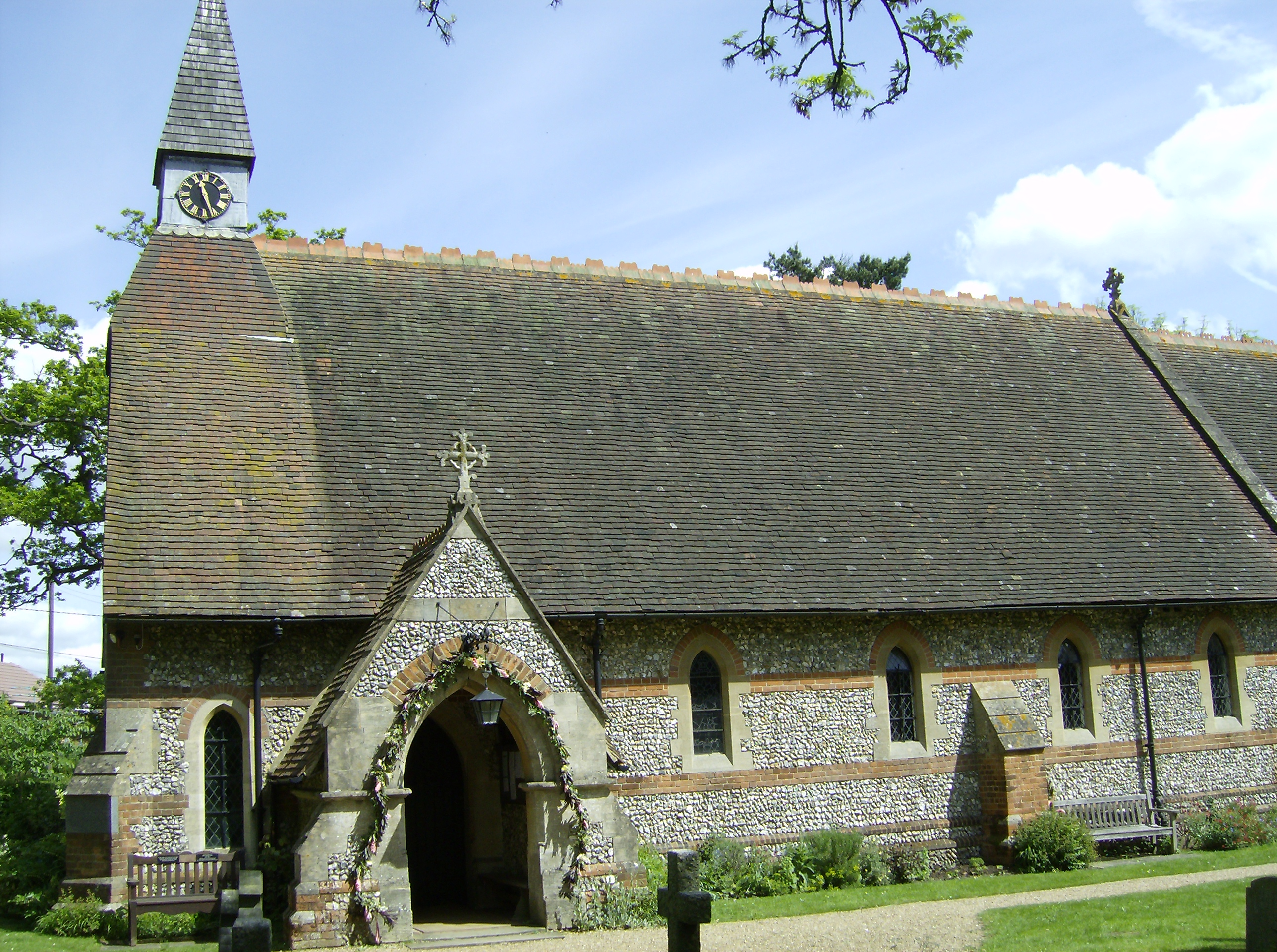
- All Saints Church, Coleshill

- Location within Buckinghamshire
- Population: 549 (2011 Census)
- OS grid reference: SU948952
- Civil parish: Coleshill
- Unitary authority: Buckinghamshire
- Ceremonial county: Buckinghamshire
- Region: South East
- Country: England
- Sovereign state: United Kingdom
- Post town: AMERSHAM
- Postcode district: HP7
- Dialling code: 01494
- Police: Thames Valley
- Fire: Buckinghamshire
- Ambulance: South Central
- UK Parliament: Chesham & Amersham

Coleshill (formerly Stoke) is a village and civil parish within Chiltern district in Buckinghamshire, England. It is 2 miles (3.2 km) south of Amersham and 3 miles (4.8 km) north of Beaconsfield.

== History ==
The village name is Anglo Saxon in origin, and means 'Coll's hill', though it has only been known by this name since the early 16th century. It appears as 'Colshull' on John Speed's maps in the early 17th century. Previously it was known as 'Stoke'. In 1844 the village was transferred from Hertfordshire to Buckinghamshire by the Counties (Detached Parts) Act 1844.

From 1919 to 1939, the village was home to the Coleshill Convalescent Home, officially opened on 27 June 1919 by Lady Portman. It had 12 beds for soldiers wounded in World War I.

== Facilities ==
The village has a primary school (Coleshill Church of England Infant School), community hall, two pubs (The Red Lion http://www.theredlioncoleshill.pub and The Harte & Magpies), a tennis club with two courts, and a cricket club. A small play park exists in Hill Meadow.

The village has a pond which is notable for the presence of Starfruit, Damasonium alisma, which is found at only a few locations in Buckinghamshire and Surrey in Southern England. The pond is centrally located and while the village does have a Common, it is rather hidden from view.

== Notable buildings ==
All Saints Church was built of flint and stone in 1861.

The village includes Georgian villas and some 1809 cottages with bottle ends set into the upper walls for decoration.

The site of the long vanished manor house where Edmund Waller was born is nearby. The house known as 'Wallers Oak' was built in 1909 as a vicarage for All Saints Church.

Porch House, Village Road, was the home of composer and painter Laura Wilson Barker following the death of her husband Tom Taylor in 1880 until her own death in 1905. Her choral setting of Keats's A Prophecy, composed in 1850, was performed for the first time 49 years later at the Hovingham Festival in 1899.

Just outside the village is The Water Tower a 30 metres (98 ft) tall structure which once fed water to Amersham but is now a residential property. This development was the subject of season one, episode four of the TV show Grand Designs
