= The Water Tower, Coleshill =

Water tower in Buckinghamshire, England

Coordinates: 51.65256°N 0.617546°W

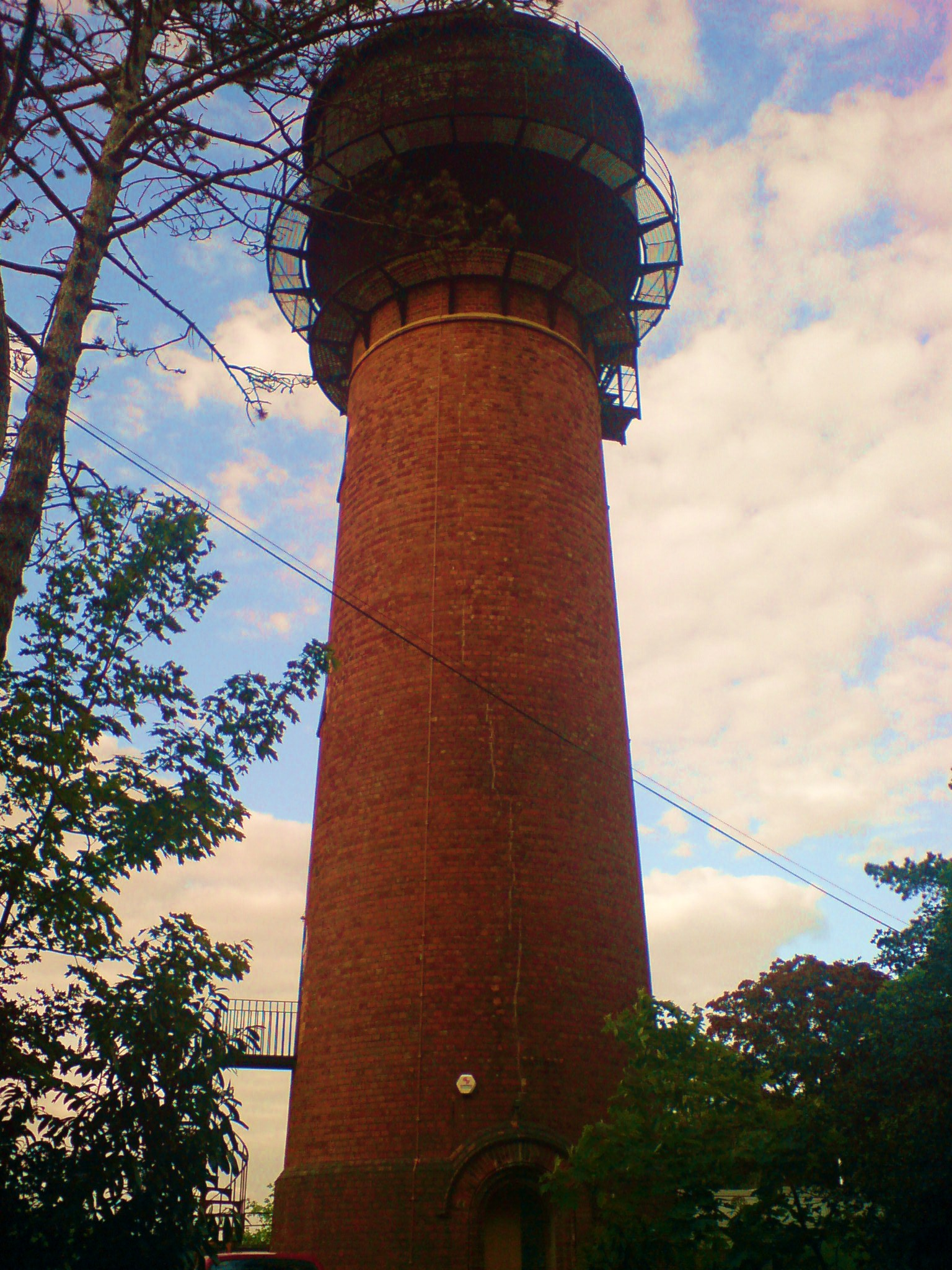
The tower in 2008

The Water Tower is a water tower located in Coleshill, Buckinghamshire. It was built by German prisoners of war during the First World War to provide a gravity fed water system for the nearby town of Amersham. The tower is 30 metres (100 ft) high with an internal diameter of 5.4 metres (18 ft). Its location on the summit of a hill makes the tower something of a local landmark and it is easily visible from the M40 motorway. Central London, Canary Wharf and Guilford Cathedral can be seen from the top of the tower on a clear day. In the late 1990s the tower was turned into a residential dwelling. In 1999 it featured on the Channel 4 programme Grand Designs.
