= The Water Tower (newspaper) =

Student newspaper at the University of Vermont

- Type: Student newspaper
- School: University of Vermont
- Founded: 2007
- Headquarters: Burlington, VT
- Website: thewatertower.news

The Water Tower is an alternative student newspaper at the University of Vermont (UVM). Launched in early 2007, it is published weekly in print during the academic year with a current circulation of 2,500. The Water Tower is available throughout the UVM campus. In addition, all articles are published digitally on The Water Tower's website.

The paper's articles include reflections on current events and student life, humor pieces, cartoons, and "Top Five" lists.

The Water Tower is entirely student-run. The paper is an officially recognized club and receives funding from UVM's Student Government Association (SGA). Writing, editing, and managing The Water Tower is all on a completely volunteer basis—students do not receive course credit for working on the newspaper.

The current Editors-in-Chief are Isabel Armstrong and Liliana Clark.

== Sources ==
- New Paper On Campus: Seven Days-type publication to come to UVM as alternative to The Vermont Cynic By Laura Pedro (Vermont Cynic 6 Feb 2007) (free registration required to read second page of article)
- Drought ends for The Water Tower - Alternative student news mag moves beyond breaking even The Vermont Cynic By Lauren Katz (Vermont Cynic 3 May 2010)
