= Thomas Yamamoto =

American artist

Thomas Yamamoto (August 20, 1917 – December 19, 2004) was an American artist.

Born in Japantown, San Francisco to two Issei, a tailor and a midwife from adjoining villages in Oita and Fukuoka Prefectures in Kyushu, Japan. Both of Yamamoto's parents were of Bushi heritage. Yamamoto was an Eagle Scout in troop 12 and attended Lowell High School, graduating in 1935. After starting in aeronautical engineering, Yamamoto switched to art at UC Berkeley graduating with a Masters of Art in 1941. This was before the advent of the Masters of Fine Art. His instructors included John Haley and Erle Loran, who worked with Hans Hofmann. To some degree they influenced his future work. He was Phi Beta Kappa.

In the 1930s, Yamamoto was active in the art scene of the San Francisco Bay area until being incarcerated in May 1942 as part of the mass internment of people of Japanese ancestry during WWII that followed the signing of Executive Order 9066. He was held first at the Assembly Center in San Francisco, and was later moved to the Topaz War Relocation Center in Utah. While there, he contributed work to the camp magazine, Trek, along with Miné Okubo. He was released early due to the sponsorship of Takashi Ohta, an artist who housed him in his West Village home in New York City. While in New York City, Yamamoto and other Japanese American artists formed the anti-fascist group Japanese Americans for Democracy.

In 1946, Yamamoto returned to Berkeley, where he met Jane Emily Pitkin, daughter of nationally recognized educator Royce S. Pitkin who brought Goddard College to prominence as an innovative school in alternative education. Because of California's anti-miscegenation laws, Yamamoto and Pitkin were married in New York City. They then traveled extensively, living at times in different countries, and Yamamoto continually practiced his art. From 1960 to 1971 they lived in Marshfield, Vermont where they raised three children. While in Marshfield, Thomas taught art at Goddard College in Plainfield, Vermont.

In 1971 they moved to Alicante, Spain where Yamamoto painted oils. He bought a litho press and did aqua tint and etchings. In 1975 he returned to Vermont briefly then Yamamoto and his wife moved to, Tutuila, American Samoa where he taught at the Community College of American Samoa. After two years there they moved to Honolulu where they spent 22 years. Unable to get a job teaching he continued painting oils. Honolulu, Hawaii before returning to central Vermont shortly before Yamamoto's death in 2004.

In 1976, in honor of the American Bicentennial, the town of Marshfield commissioned Yamamoto to do a series of paintings of historical Marshfield. These paintings are still (in 2010) on view in the Jaquith Public Library in the Old Schoolhouse Commons in Marshfield, Vermont. His work may also be found in the permanent collection of the National Gallery of Art in Washington, DC.
