= Low-residency program =

Education program

A low-residency program (or limited residency program) is a form of education, normally at the university level, which involves some amount of distance education and brief on-campus or specific-site residencies—residencies may be one weekend or several weeks. These programs are most frequently offered by colleges and universities that also teach standard full-time courses on campus. There are numerous master's degree programs in a wide range of content areas; one of the most popular limited residency degree programs is the Master of Fine Arts in creative writing. The first such program was developed by Evalyn Bates and launched in 1963 at Goddard College in Plainfield, Vermont.

There are low-residency MFA programs in creative writing, visual arts, photography, and painting. Other graduate programs that can earn a student a degree include Master of Arts, Master of Science, Master of Business Administration, and Master of Accounting. A few schools offer limited residency undergraduate options, such as Prescott College and Lesley University.

== Structure ==
Programs vary, but an intensive, low-residency model requires students to come to campus every six months for 1-2 weeks, during which time students engage in a variety of activities and lectures during the day, and create detailed study plans. During the non-residency semester periods, students study independently, sending in "packets" to their faculty mentors every month or so. The content of the packets varies with each individual, but focuses on research, writing, and reflection related to each student's individualized study plan. A few schools, such as Western State Colorado University, actually conduct live online classes via Skype each week during the non-residency periods as well as having instructors reading students' work and provide written feedback weekly.
