= Grace Gershuny =

American organic farmer and writer

Grace Gershuny (born 1950) is an American organic farmer, writer, and leader in the organic farming movement.

She is the author of books and articles on soil management and composting. She was editor of the Organic Farmer: The Digest of Sustainable Agriculture.

She serves on the faculty of the Institute for Social Ecology.

She lives in Barnet, Vermont.

== Books ==
- The Soul of Soil
- Start with the Soil Rodale Press, 1993
- Compost, Vermicompost and Compost Tea: Feeding the Soil on the Organic Farm
- The Organic Revolutionary: A Memoir from the Movement for Real Food, Planetary Healing, and Human Liberation 2020
