= Belo Cipriani =

American memoirist

Belo Miguel Cipriani
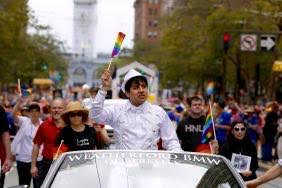
- Cipriani in 2015
- Born: Belo Miguel Cipriani; June 21, 1980 (age 46); Guatemala
- Citizenship: American
- Education: Notre Dame de Namur University
- Occupations: Author; entrepreneur; columnist

Belo Miguel Cipriani (born June 21, 1980, in Guatemala) is an American writer, publisher, and entrepreneur in the Twin Cities of Minnesota. He is the founder of Oleb Media, a digital inclusion firm, and the disability publishing house Oleb Books. He is also an activist for LGBT, disabled and cultural minority communities. Cipriani has been a columnist for publications including the Bay Area Reporter, San Francisco Chronicle, Huffington Post among others. He is the author of Blind: A Memoir (2011), which details the first two years of his recovery after he was attacked and beaten in the Castro District of San Francisco, California in 2007. Additionally, Cipriani is the official spokesperson for Guide Dogs For the Blind and was named "Best Disability Advocate" by SF Weekly in 2015.

== Early life and education ==
Belo Cipriani was born in June 1980 in Guatemala. His father was a native of Brazil and his mother was Italian. Cipriani traveled with his parents to Brazil, Peru, Mexico, and Canada before the family settled in San Jose, California when Cipriani was seven.

Cipriani attended Overfelt High School in East San Jose. In 1998, he enrolled at Notre Dame de Namur University in Belmont, California. He graduated with a degree a Bachelor of Science degree in Information Systems in 2001. He returned to Notre Dame de Namur University in 2008 where he studied under poet, Jacqueline Berger and fiction writer, Kerry Dolan. He earned a Master of Fine Arts degree in 2010. He also received a Master of Arts in Culture and Spirituality from Holy Names University in 2012, and a Doctor of Education (EdD) in Organizational Leadership from University of the Pacific in 2019.

== Career ==
Cipriani began his career as a technical recruiter and staffing consultant based in San Francisco, working with companies such as Google, Levi Strauss & Co., and Lucasfilm.

At the age of 26, Cipriani was working as a senior technical staffing consultant for Wells Fargo when he was attacked on April 13, 2007, in San Francisco's Castro District, a known LGBT neighborhood. He sustained injuries that resulted in nerve damage, rendering him completely blind. Cipriani's attackers were later identified and arrested; however due to a lack of physical evidence no charges were ever filed. He later pursued a civil lawsuit.

In 2018 he founded the publishing house Oleb Books, which focuses on publishing writers with disabilities. He is also the CEO of Oleb Media, a digital inclusion firm. He now works as a digital inclusion strategist and disability advocate, and was appointed to the Minnesota Council on Disability by Governor Tim Walz in 2020.

=== Literary career ===
Cipriani's literary career began when his debut book was released in 2011. Blind: A Memoir is a non-fiction memoir that chronicles the events surrounding the attack and his recovery. Cipriani sustained irreparable retinal nerve damage caused by receiving multiple blows to the face. Cipriani's memoir received the LGBT Rainbow Awards Honorable Mention in 2012 for "Best Debut Novel" and "Best Non-Fiction." Cipriani's memoir received the LGBT Rainbow Awards Honorable Mention in 2012 for "Best Debut Novel" and "Best Non-Fiction." It also received an honorable mention from the Eric Hoffer Book Awards (2012).

Cipriani, a former systems engineer and technical recruiter, was introduced to an assistive technology for the vision impaired called JAWS (Jobs Access With Speech) that utilizes synthesized speech and braille to allow the vision impaired to read information as it is displayed on a computer screen. Cipriani also uses a digital recorder to document his thoughts and uses an application that reads back to him what he is typing on his laptop. With the use of assistive technology, Cipriani has been able to reinvent himself as a writer and continue his column. Cipriani is a columnist for the Bay Area Reporter and writes "Seeing in the Dark," a monthly column that discusses his life as a gay blind man in San Francisco, California. In 2017 it received an honorable mention from the Katherine Schneider Journalism Award for Excellence in Reporting on Disability. As a part of the nomination judge Tony Coelho called Cipriani an "important voice" in disability writing. He also hosts a weekly talkshow segment where he shares tips and advice on career moves. The talkshow, "Get to work," is a continuance of his former career advice column.

Cipriani is a 2011 Lambda Literary Foundation Fellow for non-fiction. (Standard) He was also a 2012 writer-in-residence for the Yadda Foundation Writing Residency, and Holy Names University Writing Residency writer from 2012 to 2014 where he began teaching writing courses for the Holy Names University Oakland, California campus. In 2014, Cipriani's book, Midday Dreams a short story, was published. In 2018 he founded the publishing house Oleb Books, which focuses on publishing writers with disabilities. He is also the CEO of Oleb Media, an ADA compliance firm.

In 2018 Cipriani's second book, Firsts: Coming of Age Stories by People with Disabilities was published, which is an anthology that looks at rites of passage through the disability lens. Kirkus Reviews wrote of the book that it contains, "Powerful and intimate self-portraits from writers who have much to teach readers."

In 2018, Cipriani joined Metropolitan State University as a Community Faculty member in the Creative Writing department.

== Activism ==
Cipriani is an equal rights advocate for the LGBT, disabled, and ethnic minority communities. He has been referred to as "the voice" of the LGBT community. Cipriani was the first blind nominee for Community Grand Marshal of the Gay Pride Parade in San Francisco.

He has been a keynote speaker for the San Francisco Americans with Disabilities Act and is also a spokesperson for Guide Dogs for the Blind Association. Cipriani has also been the keynote speaker at several community awareness and advocacy events. He was the keynote speaker at the University of San Francisco for National Disabilities Awareness month and Hispanic Heritage Month at Yale University.

Cipriani was chosen as the Community Grand Marshal for the 45th Annual San Francisco LGBT Pride Celebration and Parade in 2015, serving as the first blind person in that role. In June 2015, Huffington Post named Cipriani as one of five agents of change for his advocacy and community service.

== Personal life ==
Cipriani is a martial artist and trains Capoeira under Mestre Acordeon as one of the only blind Capoeira artists in the world.

Cipriani's guide dog Madge, a yellow lab, has been featured in many of his writings and photographed in local and national newspapers. Madge retired in August 2013 with a farewell thrown by Holy Names University. Oslo, a black lab, is Cipriani's second guide dog.

== Recognition ==
In 2017, Cipriani was named an ABC7 Star.
