= Anti-product =

Anti-product may refer to:

== Chemistry ==
- Anti-product, an anti-isomer or anti addition

== Music ==
- Anti-product, a hardcore punk band fronted by vocalist Taina Asili
- Anti-Product, a song on the album The New Black by Strapping Young Lad
