= Frank Giasullo =

American jazz musician

American composer, arranger, pianist, and educator Frank Giasullo was born on December 2, 1950, in Somerville, New Jersey. He is the only child of Joseph and Michelina Giasullo. He attended public schools in his hometown of Raritan, NJ and recalls loving the piano as a very young child. He was enchanted in particular by Claude Debussy's Arabesques.

== Education ==
His classical training began with private piano lessons at the age of 12 with Arlis Heukelekian, a classical pianist of Armenian heritage. He continued lessons with “Uke” for many years until his teacher died in 2001. It was Heukelekian who performed Giasullo's original pieces for piano, three preludes, at New York City's Town Hall in 1970. He recalls an earlier pivotal moment when he was, at the age of 15, attending a concert with his piano teacher and his father of being impressed by Jimmy Smith on organ and both Dave Brubeck and Thelonious Monk on pianos, leading him to add the jazz idiom to his classical repertoire.

Giasullo earned his Bachelor of Arts in Music from Livingston College, Rutgers University in 1973 and a Master of Arts in Composition and Performance from Goddard College in Vermont. He has also studied composition with Daniel Goode, theory with Philip Corner, and jazz piano with Morris Nanton, John Coates, Jr., Richie Beirach, Don Friedman, Phil Markowitz, Bill Mays, and Skip Wilkins.

== Recordings ==
Giasullo and his quartet have released four jazz albums, starting with Expeditions; First Light in 1999, with trumpeter Pat Wristen, bassist Ken Filiano, drummer Ron Glick, and a rare vocal for Giasullo CDs, performed by Michelle Glick; Until the Next Time, and most recently Kensal Road in 2011. He has toured London ten times in the last 13 years and has played at the Brecon Jazz Festival in Wales and the London Jazz Festival.

In 2006, the CD Until the Next Time collaborated with British saxophonist Art Themen, later named by the British Jazz Awards as their top tenor sax player in 2008. Briton Dave Green played bass, and Pat Tamminen, a New Jerseyan who shares a long history with Giasullo, played the drums. Reviewer John Fordham had this to say in The Guardian (July 18, 2008) about the FGQ's performances during another UK tour as “an effortlessly assured straight-ahead jazz set led by a glossily elegant pianist” with “crisp phrasing and pearly sound.” Of the eleven tracks on the album, eight are original compositions; three are Giasullo's arrangements of jazz standards, “Autumn Leaves,” “Yesterdays,” and the Gene de Paul song, “You Don’t Know What Love Is.”

During their 2011 tour of the UK, The Frank Giasullo Quartet recorded six new Giasullo compositions and his arrangement of the traditional “House of the Rising Sun.” The straight-ahead jazz set was strongly influenced by Giasullo's classical training. They were joined by Philadelphia bassist Nicholas Krolak and New Jerseyan Pat Tamminen on drums.

Giasullo's earliest recording was as a student at Rutgers University. On Folkways Records, Gamelon in the New World consists of modern compositions for Indonesian instruments orchestrated by Dr. Barbara Benary. Many of Giasullo's original classical works, including ten preludes, an orchestral piece for strings, French horns, and English horn called “Largo,” another titled “Ashling,” translated from the Gaelic as dream, and a third for piano and voice, “Martins Creek,” remain as yet unrecorded.

== Teaching ==
Giasullo has been a jazz piano instructor at Moravian College in Bethlehem, PA, since 2006. He previously taught jazz theory and improvisation at Raritan Valley Community College for ten years and keeps a studio in the historic Old Egg Auction in Flemington, NJ, for private and advanced students.
