= Sue Owen =

Sue Owen may refer to:

- Sue Owen (civil servant) (born 1955), British former civil servant, economist and academic
- Sue Owen (poet) (born 1942), American poet

== See also ==
- Susan Owen, American operatic soprano
