= Cara Hoffman =

American writer

- Born: New York, U.S.
- Education: Goddard College (MFA)
- Occupations: Novelist, journalist
- Writing career
- Notable work: So Much Pretty
- Website: carahoffman.net

Cara Hoffman is an American novelist, essayist, and journalist. She is the author of three critically acclaimed novels, So Much Pretty (2011), Be Safe, I Love You (2014), and Running (2017).

Her fiction and essays have been featured in The New York Times, The Paris Review, Rolling Stone, Salon, LitHub, Fifth Estate, Marie Claire, The Daily Beast, Bennington College Review, BOMB Magazine, Teen Vogue, and on radio at NPR.

She has been a visiting writer at Goddard College, and St. John’s University, and has lectured at Oxford University's Rhodes Global Scholar's Symposium.

She teaches writing and literature at Johns Hopkins University and has taught Bronx Community College.

== Life and career ==
Hoffman grew up in Northern Appalachia and the Rust Belt. She dropped out of high school to travel, working in Europe and the Middle East, and did not get an undergraduate degree. In the mid-1990s she became a newspaper reporter covering crime and environmental politics.

In 2009 Hoffman completed an MFA in fiction at Goddard College.

In 2017, she received a MacDowell Fellowship and in 2018 she was named an Edward Albee Fellow.

== Books ==
- Hoffman, Cara (2011). So Much Pretty. Simon & Schuster. ISBN 9781451616774.
- Hoffman, Cara (2014). Be Safe I Love You. Simon & Schuster. ISBN 9781451641325.
- Hoffman, Cara (2018). Running. Simon & Schuster. ISBN 9781476757582.
- Hoffman, Cara (2018). Ruin. PM Press. ISBN 9781629639291.

=== So Much Pretty ===
So Much Pretty was met with positive reviews. Publishers Weekly gave it a Starred Review, and The Los Angeles Times said, "To say more about Hoffman's constantly surprising story is to reveal too much, but the payoff is more than worth the slow-building suspense".

The New York Times wrote:

"For all the passion in this intense narrative, Hoffman writes with a restraint that makes poetry of pain. She also shows a mastery of her craft by developing the story over 17 years and narrating it from multiple perspectives. While each has a different take on the horrific events that no one saw coming, the people who live in this insular place remain willfully blind to their contributions to the deeper causes that made this tragedy almost inevitable".

The New York Times Book Review later called the novel the best suspense novel of 2011.

=== Be Safe I Love You ===
Hoffman's second novel was published in April 2014, receiving critical praise and a nomination for the 2015 Folio Prize. George Stephanopoulos interviewed Hoffman about the book for ABC News on August 29, 2014. Library Journal gave it a starred review and called it, "a contemporary version of Tim O’Brien’s The Things They Carried with a female protagonist."

The New York Times Book Review wrote:

“A finely tuned piece of fiction . . . Be Safe I Love You is a painful exploration of the devastation wrought by combat even when the person returns from war without a scratch. The story—written with such lucid detail it's hard to believe the main character is an invention—suggests the damage starts long before the soldier reports for duty. . . . In crystalline language that conveys both the desolation of the Iraqi desert and the north country of New York State . . . this book is a reminder that art and love are all that can keep us from despair.”

Hoffman wrote a related op-ed piece on female veterans for the New York Times entitled The Things She Carried which was published on March 31, 2014, and another on the human cost of war for SALON in July 2014.

Be Safe I Love You was selected as a recipient of the 2015 Sundance Institute Global Filmmaking Award. The project will be directed by Haifaa al-Mansour.

=== Running ===
Hoffman's third novel, Running, was published in February 2017 by Simon & Schuster and edited by Ira Silverberg.

On March 17, 2017, Justin Torres wrote in The New York Times Book Review:

"Hoffman impressively evokes the combination of nihilism, idealism, rootlessness, psychic and economic necessity, lust and love that might set a young person adrift. Unlike the runaway heroes of many queer narratives these characters are not cast out but looking to get lost...The Athens on display here is peopled with rebels and runaways of all kinds, idealists, revolutionary operatives, con men, wayward young scholars, squatters...In Bridey and Milo Hoffman has created memorable anti-heroes: tough and resourceful scarred, feral and sexy. The book and the characters refuse to conform and Running like all good outlaw literature takes sharp aim at the contemporary culture’s willingness to do so."

Running was listed as a New York Times Editor's Choice, a "Most Anticipated Book of 2017" selection by The Millions, one of Entertainment Weekly's "Best New Books" one of Esquire's "Best Books of 2017", and one of Autostraddle's "Queer and Feminist Books to read in 2017"

Running was translated into Greek and published by Gutenberg Press in 2024.

=== Ruin ===
Hoffman’s fourth literary work is a book of short stories titled Ruin, published by PM Press on April 5, 2022.
