= Ella Seaver Owen =

American painter

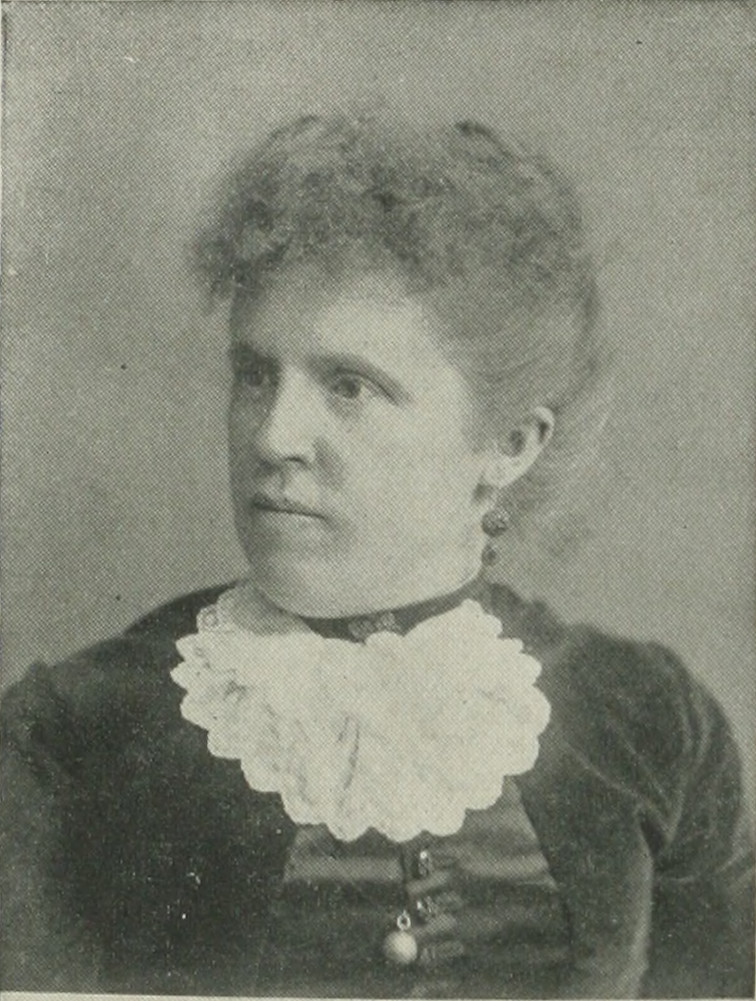
Ella Seaver Owen, "A woman of the century"

Ella Seaver Owen (February 26, 1852 – November 11, 1910) was an American artist and teacher. For many years, she taught oil, watercolor, and china painting, and was one of the pioneers, outside of New York City, in china firing. Owen was one of the first women admitted to the University of Vermont, and was one of the founders of the Alpha Rho out of which grew Lambda of Kappa Alpha Theta.

== Early years and education ==
Ella Seaver was born in Williamstown, Vermont, February 26, 1852. Her father, Asahel Bingham Seaver, born and brought up in Williamstown, Vermont, was a descendant of Robert Seaver, an Englishman, who came to the United States in the seventeenth century. Her mother, whose maiden name was Aurelia Adams, was also of English descent. Owen was one of two children. When she was an infant, her father moved to Burlington, Vermont, where he was a successful teacher in the public schools for many years. Her brother, Harlan Page Seaver, moved later to Springfield, Massachusetts.

From early childhood, Owen was fond of pencil and color-box, and, as she grew older, she had the best instruction in drawing and painting the town afforded. Fond of study, she was ambitious to receive a college education and prepared in the high school, studying Greek. When, in 1872, the University of Vermont, in Burlington, opened its doors to women, she entered it and was graduated in 1876, taking the degree of A. B.

== Career ==
After teaching a few terms in the Clarke Schools for Hearing and Speech, in Northampton, Massachusetts, she decided to go to the Cooper Union School of Art, in Manhattan. Before that move, she had decorated small articles, which had begun to find sale at home. It was in the beginning of the decorative craze, when the term "hand-painted" was expected to sell anything to which it could be applied. She looked about and found such inartistic things on sale in the stores in New York that she offered some of her work, and was gratified to have it readily taken and more ordered. She found herself able, besides spending four hours a day in the art-school, to earn enough by decorative work to pay her expenses and graduate from the normal designing-class in May, 1880. A part of the time, she was a member of the sketch-class in the Art Students League of New York and took lessons in china painting in the school later called the Osgood Art School.

On August 18, 1880, she married Frank Allen Owen, a chemist, born and reared in Burlington. She continued her art and sent work to the women's exchanges, and with those societies, had much profitable experience. She taught painting in her own and neighboring towns, having had, in all, several hundreds of pupils. In 1881, she became interested in china-firing. From the time she left the art school, she worked constantly in oils and watercolors. In 1886, having acquired a large number of studies and receiving many calls to rent them, she decided to classify them and to send out price lists, offering to rent studies and send them by mail anywhere in the U.S. and Canada. That venture proved successful. She had calls from every state in the Union.

== Personal life ==
Owen had three children, and her mother lived with the family. She died at her home in Burlington on November 11, 1910, after a short illness.
