= Williamstown, Vermont =

- Town
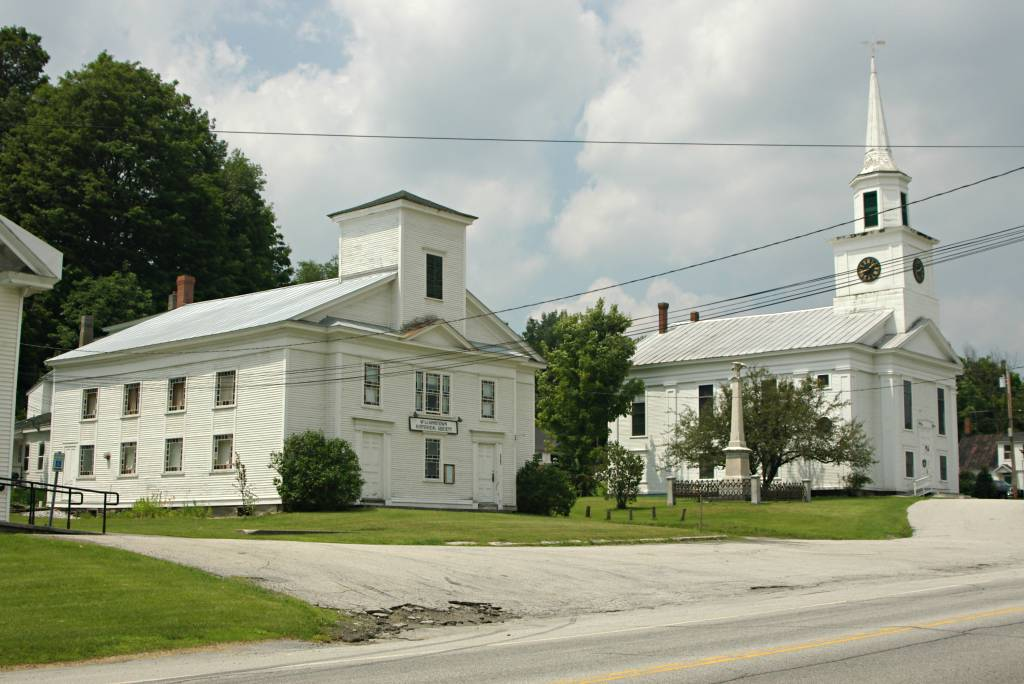
- Historical society and church in Williamstown

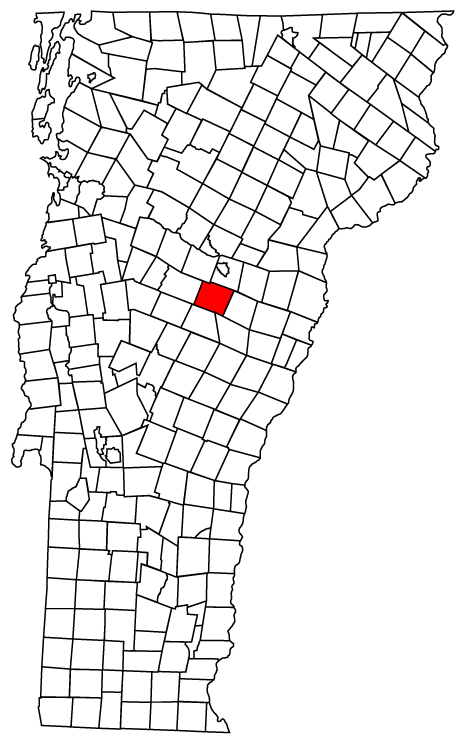
- Williamstown, Vermont
- Coordinates: 44°06′58″N 72°32′27″W
- Country: United States
- State: Vermont
- County: Orange
- Communities: Williamstown; Foxville

Area
  - Total: 40.3 sq mi (104.5 km^{2})
  - Land: 40.2 sq mi (104.1 km^{2})
  - Water: 0.15 sq mi (0.4 km^{2})
- Elevation: 879 ft (268 m)

Population (2020)
  - Total: 3,515
  - Density: 88/sq mi (33.8/km^{2})
- Time zone: UTC-5 (Eastern (EST))
  - Summer (DST): UTC-4 (EDT)
- ZIP Codes: 05679 (Williamstown); 05654 (Graniteville); 05663 (Northfield)
- Area code: 802
- FIPS code: 50-84175
- GNIS feature ID: 1462262
- Website: williamstownvt.org

Williamstown is a town in Orange County, Vermont, United States. The population was 3,515 at the 2020 census, making it the second largest municipality in the county.

== Geography ==
According to the United States Census Bureau, the town has a total area of 40.3 square miles (104.5 km^{2}), of which 40.2 square miles (104.1 km^{2}) is land and 0.2 square mile (0.4 km^{2}) (0.40%) is water. The village of Williamstown is in the central part of the town.

The Ainsworth State Park is a 905-acre (3.7 km^{2}) park located in Williamstown which provides camping, hiking, and hunting.

== Demographics ==
Historical population
Census	Pop.	Note	%±
1790	146		—
1800	839		474.7%
1810	1,353		61.3%
1820	1,481		9.5%
1830	1,487		0.4%
1840	1,620		8.9%
1850	1,452		−10.4%
1860	1,377		−5.2%
1870	1,236		−10.2%
1880	1,038		−16.0%
1890	1,188		14.5%
1900	1,610		35.5%
1910	1,726		7.2%
1920	1,526		−11.6%
1930	1,608		5.4%
1940	1,477		−8.1%
1950	1,600		8.3%
1960	1,553		−2.9%
1970	1,822		17.3%
1980	2,284		25.4%
1990	2,839		24.3%
2000	3,225		13.6%
2010	3,389		5.1%
2020	3,515		3.7%
U.S. Decennial Census

As of the census of 2000, there were 3,225 people, 1,248 households, and 889 families residing in the town. The population density was 80.3 people per square mile (31.0/km^{2}). There were 1,318 housing units at an average density of 32.8 per square mile (12.7/km^{2}). The racial makeup of the town was 98.33% White, 0.06% African American, 0.28% Native American, 0.12% Asian, 0.25% from other races, and 0.96% from two or more races. Hispanic or Latino of any race were 0.78% of the population.

There were 1,248 households, out of which 34.1% had children under the age of 18 living with them, 58.7% were married couples living together, 8.4% had a female householder with no husband present, and 28.7% were non-families. 21.3% of all households were made up of individuals, and 7.8% had someone living alone who was 65 years of age or older. The average household size was 2.58 and the average family size was 3.01.

In the town, the population was spread out, with 26.2% under the age of 18, 7.0% from 18 to 24, 32.5% from 25 to 44, 24.5% from 45 to 64, and 9.8% who were 65 years of age or older. The median age was 36 years. For every 100 females, there were 105.0 males. For every 100 females age 18 and over, there were 98.4 males.

The median income for a household in the town was $38,929, and the median income for a family was $45,859. Males had a median income of $29,635 versus $22,378 for females. The per capita income for the town was $17,720. About 5.9% of families and 8.0% of the population were below the poverty line, including 10.9% of those under age 18 and 2.9% of those age 65 or over.

== Notable people ==
- Evalyn Bates, educator
- John Coughlin, awarded the Medal of Honor for his actions during the Civil War
- Thomas Davenport, inventor, constructed the first American DC electric motor
- Rockwell J. Flint, Wisconsin state legislator and newspaper editor
- Mark MacDonald, Vermont state legislator
- Ella Seaver Owen (1852–1910), artist, teacher
- Elijah Paine, United States senator
- Joseph Raycroft, university professor and basketball coach
- Rollin White, inventor
