= So Much Pretty =

2011 novel by Cara Hoffman

First edition

So Much Pretty is the debut novel of Cara Hoffman, published by Simon & Schuster and released on March 15, 2011.

== Plot ==
So Much Pretty is about a young woman, Wendy White, who goes missing from her small town and is found murdered several months later. The novel then focuses on the investigation into her life, disappearance, and death by reporter Stacey Flynn.

== Reviews ==
Publishers Weekly gave the novel a starred review, calling it a "remarkable debut". Booklist compared it to a mixture of The Girl With the Dragon Tattoo and The Lovely Bones, and said Hoffman was a "talented new writer". The LA Times said it was a "skillful, psychologically acute tale", concluding that "... the payoff is more than worth the slow-building suspense".
