= Bradford Graves =

American artist

Bradford Graves (26 July 1939 – 16 April 1998) was a sculptor, musician, and teacher. Born in Dallas, Texas in 1939, Graves was graduated from Woodrow Wilson High School in 1957 and attended Texas A&M University. He went to New York in 1958 and received a BA and MA from Goddard College. With Manhattan as his base, he pursued an extraordinary range of interests.

Graves taught at Parsons School of Design and was a professor of Fine Arts at Fairleigh Dickinson University. He participated in many solo and group exhibitions, received numerous grants, awards, and critical recognition from many admirers.

He was married to Verna Gillis for thirty-four years.

Bradford Graves Sculpture Park opened May 2010 in Kerhonkson, New York.

== Reviews and quotes ==
An example of Graves's work

"...The compositional schemes balance masses in a way that expresses tension between the forces of growth and gravity….I remember his past shows as being primarily of carved stone sculptures of pronounced archaic or totemic character." —Edward J. Sozanski, The Philadelphia Inquirer, June 3, 2005

"The limestone carvings of Bradford Graves are a celebration of profound perplexity and mystery. They explain themselves neither quickly nor easily. Instead, they invite deliberately paced intellectual search and spiritual speculation...Stimulating the exercise of imagination, the sculptures challenge to invent their own relevant meanings...these silent pieces of chiseled rock plumb the sublime. In their unique way they illuminate mystical depths...there is a growing coterie of admirers able to appreciate the majesty implicit in Graves’ language of form." —Burton Wasserman, Art Matters, May 1996

"Bradford Graves is an original and ingenious form maker....Graves’ display, one of the most striking and profound sculpture solo exhibitions in Philadelphia in recent years, presents a profusion of abstract shapes that seem to well up from the artists imagination as in natural growth." —Victoria Donohoe, The Philadelphia Inquirer, March 11, 1989

"Bradford Graves’ sculpture is complex. We see carved limestone slabs that look like the ruins of ancient walls. In front of them are horizontal pieces of limestone grooved in a geometrical pattern. One senses obscure, mystical meaning which is moving...Graves’ work is difficult to describe but very much worth seeing...Graves is a sculptor worth following. His work is original and very interesting indeed, and the Thorpe Gallery is much to be commended for showing such radical, yet resolutely untrendy work." —John Caldwell, The New York Times, March 8, 1981

"Two unusually accomplished artists are now on view. Especially impressive is Bradford Graves, a sculptor who works imaginatively in limestone. Graves seems to be creating modest-sized monuments...his work is most effective when they create the impression of almost natural elements such as one might find, perhaps, in a Surreal seaside landscape." —James R. Mellow, The New York Times, May 19, 1973

"Another fine display of sculpture may be seen at Georgetown University’s Inter-Cultural Center and features the work of New York sculptor Bradford Graves...More so than with the work of many modern sculptors, the viewer must rely on his intuition to interpret his pieces...In sum, Mr. Graves’ sculpture is enigmatic. It unites the twin themes of natural organic development and human-imposed structure. It succeeds. The success of this synthesis occurs on a strictly subliminal level: and it's good that it does because it keeps one thinking, questioning." —Michael Weizenbach, The Washington Times, May 1, 1986

"Art galleries no longer show much carved stone sculpture which makes the show by Bradford Graves something of an anomaly. He wants it to say stone in the traditional sense, but he also tries to make it a vehicle for contemporary sculptural language. This results in work that looks a bit other worldly, as if it had dropped in from another planet....The sculptures look archaic, like archeological artifacts. On the other hand their abstraction is organic and totally contemporary which sets up a rather vigorous clash of sensations. ...Either way, it gets your attention." —The Philadelphia Inquirer, April 9, 1993

"Bradford Graves sustains the greatest amount of interest through his low-keyed and highly evocative works of profound originality....His work combines pallid, subtly textured rock with water that rests in a track-like indentation that runs down the length of limestone. The elements slowly fuse....In other works Graves evokes his haunting rhythms, stimulating quiet contemplation of his most unusual and visionary gems of sculpture." —Barbara Cavaliere, arts magazine," September 1978

"An unusually accomplished artist is now on view in the museums’ galleries. Bradford Graves works imaginatively in limestone, sometimes smoothing it into seemingly weather, slab-like shapes, sometimes breaking it up into smallish, gravel-like chunks, and sometimes even stringing it together with strands of rope. Graves’ works are most effective when they create the impression of almost natural elements such as one might find, perhaps, in a Surreal seaside landscape." —Elizabeth Steves, The New York Times, May 19, 1973

== Personal philosophy about sculpture ==
“The making of sculpture may be taken as a desire for wholeness: The recognition of one’s identity as part of the earth and its materials. In the confrontation of one’s inner image with physical materials, a dialogue begins and the result is a sculptural statement. Through this dialogue an attempt is made to clarify subject and object matter. The subject matter is the discovery, and not how much I know as I fabricate the sculpture. The object matter is the myriad of personal preconceptions that we transfer on to materials. People, cultures, other objects, past events - All become the excess baggage of symbols carried around with us. become the basis of abstract object art. Out of this confrontation, what we look for is the art of “The real.” The real is the dialogue between fabricator and his materials, not a dialogue with oneself. One wants to touch, walk the earth, and create a place for events. The material I have chosen to have a working dialogue with is stone. Stone, one of the oldest sculptural materials, not to be confused with its architectural use, has been limited by its outer boundaries, the monolithic block. I have attempted to overcome this by utilizing work methods derived from constructivism, the pitting together of separate blocks allowing space to become an active part of the sculpture. This is a unifying method of working that allows each unit of my sculptures to create its own reasons for existence. The process is analogous to crystallization. First there is the idea, the basis of an internal ordering of structure, expanded or split into different units. From this, the resulting segmentation of a conceptual idea through physical units hints at the crystallization. They become like stars in the night sky, each defined by its own space, but perceived together they make up the fabric of a universe.” —Bradford Graves.
