= Helen Landgarten =

American psychotherapist, art therapist

Helen Landgarten (March 4, 1921 – February 23, 2011) was an American psychotherapist. Alongside Edith Kramer and Judith A. Rubin, she was one of the leading pioneers of art therapy.

== Biography ==
Helen Barbara Trapper was born in Detroit, Michigan, March 4, 1921. She earned a bachelor's degree at University of California, Los Angeles (Fine Arts, 1963) and a master's degree from Goddard College (Marital and family therapy, 1972).

She was a professor and director of the Faculty of Clinical Art Therapy at Loyola Marymount University in Los Angeles, California. She worked as an art psychotherapist in the psychiatric department of the Cedars-Sinai Medical Center. As an honorary member of the American Professional Association of Art Therapists, she contributed to the spread of art therapy first in the US and increasingly in Europe and around the world. Landgarten led numerous workshops in Germany, Sweden, Russia, Israel, South Africa and Brazil. In addition, she wrote several books, of which two were translated into German. The Helen B. Landgarten Art Therapy Clinic at Loyola Marymount University was founded in 2007.

In her first book, entitled Clinical Art Therapy, Landgarten conveys her experience gained through the time of her practice. This work aims to show the scope of application of the therapy form while working with all age groups in the most diverse settings.

In her second book, Art Therapy as Family Therapy, the author deals exclusively with art therapy for families. Case studies of various diagnoses are structured in terms of developmental chronology and show the conclusive combination of both forms of therapy, founded on a common, partnership-based level of argumentation for parents, children and even grandparents. The collaborative work within the framework of family therapy forms the basis for the analysis of unconscious messages and thus the prerequisite for understanding and change.

In 1942, she married Nathan Landgarten. They had two children. Landgardten died in Los Angeles, February 23, 2011, after a stroke.

== Selected works ==
- Group art therapy format with children of holocaust survivors, 1981
- Clinical art therapy: a comprehensive guide., 1981
- Ten Year Follow-Up Survey on the Status of Art Therapy in the Greater Los Angeles Area, 1984
- The Artist in Each of Us, 1985
- Family art psychotherapy: a clinical guide and casebook, 1987
- Klinische Kunsttherapie: ein umfassender Leitfaden, 1990
- Adult art psychotherapy: issues and applications, 1991
- Family creative arts therapies: Past and present, 1991
- Magazine Photo Collage as a Multicultural Treatment and Assessment Technique, 1994
- Kunsttherapie als Familientherapie: ein klinischer Leitfaden mit Falldarstellungen, 2010
- Clinical Art Therapy A Comprehensive Guide, 2013
- Adult Art Psychotherapy Issues And Applications, 2013
- Clinical Art Therapy A Comprehensive Guide, 2014
- Magazine Photo Collage: a Multicultural Assessment And Treatment Technique, 2017
