= University of Utah Press =

Independent publishing branch

- University of Utah Press logo with Defiance House Man, which is based upon a four-foot-tall ancient Puebloan pictograph near Glen Canyon, Utah.
- Parent company: J. Willard Marriott Library, University of Utah
- Founded: 1949
- Founder: A. Ray Olpin
- Country of origin: United States
- Headquarters location: Salt Lake City, Utah
- Distribution: Chicago Distribution Center
- Publication types: Books
- Official website: www.uofupress.com

The University of Utah Press is the independent publishing branch of the University of Utah and is a division of the J. Willard Marriott Library. Founded in 1949 by A. Ray Olpin, it is also the oldest university press in Utah. The mission of the press is to "publish and disseminate scholarly books in selected fields, as well as other printed and recorded materials of significance to Utah, the region, the country, and the world."

The University of Utah Press publishes in the following general subject areas: anthropology, archaeology, Mesoamerican studies, American Indian studies, natural history, nature writing, poetry, Utah and Western history, Mormon studies, Utah and regional guidebooks, and regional titles. The press employs seven people full-time and publishes 25 to 35 titles per year. The press has over 450 books currently in print.

== Prizes ==
The University of Utah Press awards five annual or biennial prizes for scholarly and/or literary manuscripts.

- The Wallace Stegner Prize in Environmental or American Western History
  - 2010: Frederick H. Swanson, The Bitterroot and Mr. Brandborg: Clearcutting and the Struggle for Sustainable Forestry in the Northern Rockies
- The Juanita Brooks Prize in Mormon Studies
  - 2015: Matthew Garrett, Making Lamanites: Mormons, Native Americans, and the Indian Student Placement Program, 1947-2000
  - 2013: Todd M. Compton, A Frontier Life: Jacob Hamblin, Explorer and Indian Missionary
- The Don D. and Catherine S. Fowler Prize for anthropology and archaeology
  - 2010: Scott G. Ortman, Winds from the North: Tewa Origins and Historical Anthropology
  - 2009: Phil R. Geib, Foragers and Farmers of the Northern Kayenta: Excavations along the Navajo Mountain Road
- The Agha Shahid Ali Poetry Prize Prizewinners are listed below according to year.
  - 2025: Caleb Nolen, Afterlight
  - 2024: Dan Murphy, Estate Sale
  - 2023: Sara Fowler, Two Signatures
  - 2022: Béatrice Szymkowiak, B/RDS
  - 2021: Carolyn Oliver, Inside the Storm I Want to Touch the Tremble
  - 2020: Benjamin Gucciardi, West Portal
  - 2019: Zachary Asher, gone bird in the glass hours
  - 2018: Lindsay Lusby, Catechesis
  - 2017: Heather June Gibbons, Her Mouth as Souvenir
  - 2016: Philip Schaefer, Bad Summon
  - 2015: Davis McCombs, lore
  - 2014: Sara Wallace, The Rival
  - 2013: Kara Candito, Spectator
  - 2012: Mark Jay Brewin Jr., Scrap Iron
  - 2011: Kim Young, Night Radio
  - 2010: Jennifer Perrine, In the Human Zoo
  - 2009: Jon Wilkins, Transistor Rodeo
  - 2008: Jessica Garratt, Fire Pond
  - 2007: Susan McCabe, Descartes' Nighmare
  - 2006: Jane Springer, Dear Blackbirds
  - 2005: Bino Realuyo, The Gods We Worship Live Next Door
  - 2004: Jacqueline Berger, Things That Burn
  - 2003: Ann Lauinger, Persuasions of Fall

== Series ==
As of 2023, the University of Utah Press offers six series: The Juanita Brooks Series in Mormon History and Culture, The Wallace Stegner Series in Environmental Studies, Utah Series on Great Salt Lake and the Great Basin, University of Utah Anthropological Papers, National Park Readers, and Inclusive Anthropologies.

- University of Utah Anthropological Papers

This series is

"a medium for reporting to interested scholars and the people of Utah research in anthropology and allied sciences bearing upon the peoples and cultures of the Great Basin and the West. They include, first, specialized and technical record reports on Great Basin archeology, ethnology, linguistics, and physical anthropology, and second, more general articles on anthropological discoveries, problems, and interpretations bearing upon the western region, from the High Plains to the Pacific Coast, insofar as they are relevant to human and cultural relations in the Great Basin and surrounding areas."

The first Anthropological Paper was published in 1950 and new books continue to be published through the present.

Past Series:

- Tanner Lectures on Human Values

This annual lecture series was established by philanthropist Obert Clark Tanner with the hope that the "lectures will contribute to the intellectual and moral life of mankind." Lecturers from a variety of cultures and fields are chosen on the basis of their leadership, integrity, and commitment to human values. The lectures consider the relationships between scientific and scholarly advancements and moral values and are published in an annual volume by the University of Utah Press. Past lecturers include: E. O. Wilson, Carlos Fuentes, Freeman Dyson, Paul Farmer, Steven Pinker, and Toni Morrison.

- Utah Series in Middle East Studies

Originally named the Utah Series in Turkish and Islamic Studies, this series published books in the area of history, politics, and society of the Middle East. M. Hakan Yavuz was the Series Editor. The first book published by the series was Guenter Lewy's The Armenian Massacres in Ottoman Turkey: A Disputed Genocide in 2006; the book had previously been rejected by eleven publishers including four university presses. Since then, the series published many other works that seek to reject the historical consensus that the Armenian genocide was a genocide, by such authors as Justin McCarthy, Edward J. Erickson, and Yücel Güçlü. These books have been criticized for methodological flaws and factual errors.

== See also ==
- List of English-language book publishing companies
- List of university presses
