= Geraldine Clinton Little =

American poet

Geraldine Clinton Little (September 20, 1923 – March 7, 1997) was a poet born in Northern Ireland. Emigrating to the United States with her family at age 2, she spent her life in the United States. She published ten books, and her stories and poems appeared in over 400 journals.

== Personal life ==
Born in Northern Ireland, she was the sixth child of an Irish Methodist minister, the Rev. James Robert Clinton who came to the United States in 1925. He was the senior minister of the Central Congregational Church in central city Philadelphia for many years. The family lived in the Mt. Airy section of Philadelphia.

Little moved to Mount Holly Township, New Jersey, in 1956 with her husband Robert K. Little, an inventor and President and CEO of RKL Controls, Inc., of Lumberton Township. She had three sons, Rory, of San Francisco, Tim, of Pemberton, New Jersey, and Rodney, of Peachtree City, Georgia; five grandchildren; and three sisters, Gwen Murphy, Hilda Greene Perkins and Ailsa Muldoon. She also had two brothers, Kenneth and Trevor.

She died on March 7, 1997, at her Mount Holly Township home from congestive heart failure caused by amyloidosis, a form of protein aggregation.

== Writing ==
Little's published works include eight volumes of poetry.

Her final book, Woman in a Special House, a collection of 18 short stories, was published just one month before her death by Fithian Press.

Her career as a poet, fiction writer, playwright, and college instructor started late in life, after she graduated from Goddard College in Vermont in 1970. She completed her bachelor's degree in English while raising three sons who were in high school at the time. She received her master's degree from Trenton State College, now the College of New Jersey, in 1977.

Her poetry went from haiku—a short Japanese verse form—to book-length poems, including "Hakugai," which "gives voice" to the 110,000 Japanese-Americans interned in prison camps during World War II, according to a 1984 review. It said, "Through dramatic monologues, snatches of conversation and journal notes, the prisoners lost words are heard again. The world of their hakugai [persecution] is resurrected."

Perhaps her best known work was a play, Heloise and Abelard, written in 1989. It was produced off-Broadway in 1990 by Edgar Lansbury, Angela Lansbury's brother and, later, locally by the Foundation Theater at Burlington County College, among others.

Mrs. Little won numerous awards for her work over the years, including six national awards from the Poetry Society of America. In 1996, she was honored with an award from a Japanese city for her haiku writing. She was a past president of the Haiku Society of America and a past vice president of Poetry Society of America.

She was an adjunct instructor in writing and English literature at Burlington County College for more than a decade and had previously taught at Rutgers and Trenton State College. She was well known for her appearances at writing conferences and as a lecturer for adults as well as children.

Asked if she had a favorite work, she would say, 'No. Your poems are like your children—you don't pick favorites.'

Poet Karen Swenson, winner of the 1993 National Poetry Series award, recalled that Mrs. Little's works stood out because of their "unusual clarity and precision of form... and were full of wonderful imagery."

== Singing ==
She also sang, and her singing career included performing with the Choral Arts Society of Philadelphia, the major choral group associated with the Philadelphia Orchestra. She also performed with a company specializing in the Gilbert and Sullivan operettas. Her son recalled, "She really loved her singing. She sang with the group until about six months before her death. She could hardly walk but was still there singing."

Little also sang for the choir of the First Presbyterian Church of Moorestown Township, New Jersey.
