= Mary Johnson (writer) =

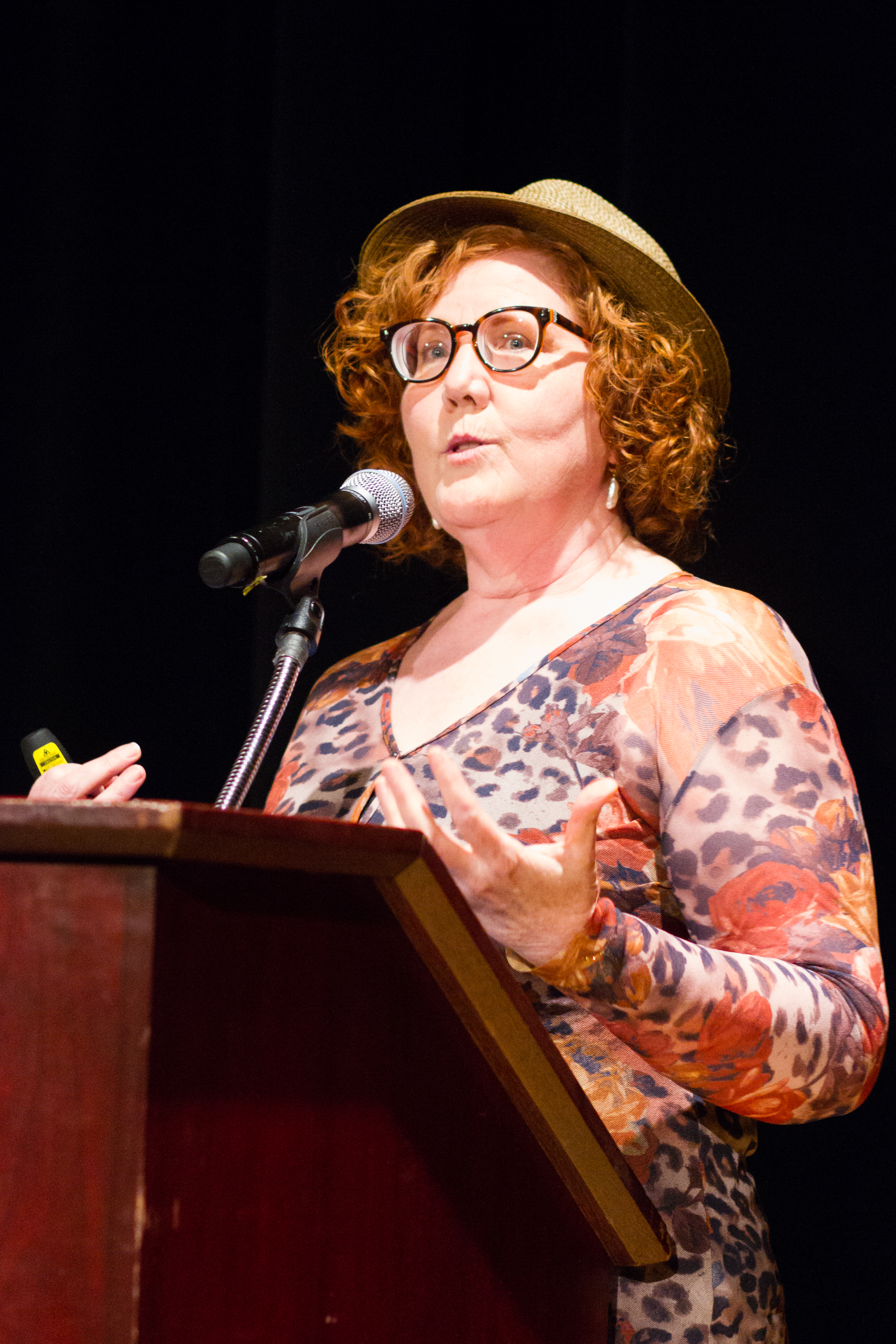
Mary Johnson at SSAcon 2015

Mary Johnson is a writer and director of A Room of Her Own Foundation. She worked and served with the Missionaries of Charity, the order of nuns founded by Mother Teresa, for twenty years before leaving the order. She is now a writer and a public speaker and a supporter of women's rights in the arts. She received her bachelor's degree in English from Lamar University and her MFA in creative writing from Goddard College.

== Family and early life ==
Johnson was born in Ann Arbor, Michigan, in 1958. The family moved to Beaumont, Texas when Johnson was 12. By this time, she was the eldest of seven children. In high school, Johnson was a member of the debate team and was voted "most likely to succeed" by her classmates.

== Mother Teresa ==
In 1977, Johnson saw a picture of Mother Teresa on the cover of Time magazine. After reading the article she felt a call to join the Missionaries of Charity in their work on behalf of the poorest of the poor. At the age of 19, Johnson moved to the South Bronx in order to join the novitiate as an aspirant. In 1980, she committed herself to a life of chastity, poverty, obedience, and service to the poorest of the poor, taking final vows in 1986. While with the order, Johnson, or Sister Donata ("Freely Given") as she elected to be called by her sisters, studied theology at Regina Mundi at the Gregorian University in Rome, receiving a diploma in religious studies. While serving at the novitiate in Tor Fiscale in Rome, Johnson was assigned the confidential task of editing and revising the Constitutions, the governing documents of the Missionaries of Charity. For six years, Mother appointed her to serve in overseeing the formation of sisters preparing for vows. After falling in love with a sister and then later a priest, Johnson broke her vows and left the order in 1997.

== A Room of Her Own Foundation ==
=== Beginning ===
In 2000, while working at a parish church and re-adjusting to life outside the order, Johnson attended a retreat for continuing education at Ghost Ranch in Abiquiu, New Mexico. While participating in a women's group at the ranch, Johnson told her group that she wanted only privacy—a "room of her own"—and financial support so that she could commit to telling the story of her work with the Sisters. Also at the Ranch was Darlene Chandler Bassett. Chandler Bassett had retired early from a career with Los Angeles-based entrepreneur and arts patron Eli Broad and was seeking rest and a new direction at the ranch, one week after the death of her mother. Chandler Basset agreed to fund Johnson's graduate studies at Goddard College if Johnson would in turn help start a foundation for creative women.

=== Foundation ===
Since its inception in 2000, the A Room of Her Own Foundation (AROHO) has awarded six women with the biennial "Gift of Freedom Award," an award of $50,000 accompanied by creative and professional resources in support of the recipient's proposed creative project. Returning to its origins, the foundation also hosts a Retreat for Women Writers at Ghost Ranch every other summer. Johnson continues to serve as Creative Director of the foundation's retreats and to supervise the various publication contests and programs run by the foundation.

== An Unquenchable Thirst ==
With the support of the foundation's growing community, Johnson finally published the story of her work with the Missionaries of Charity in her memoir, An Unquenchable Thirst: Following Mother Teresa in Search of Love, Service, and an Authentic Life (Spiegel & Grau, 2011). The book earned a place on Kirkus Review's Best Books of the Year list.

== Current work ==
Johnson teaches creative writing and Italian and continues to serve as Creative Director for A Room of Her Own Foundation Retreats. She is a fellow of the MacDowell Colony in Peterborough, New Hampshire. She is married and lives with her husband in New Hampshire.
