= Bino Realuyo =

Bino A. Realuyo is a Filipino-American novelist, poet, community organizer and adult educator. He is the author of a novel, The Umbrella Country; a poetry collection, The Gods We Worship Live Next Door; and several stories; he is also editor of two anthologies. His family background inspires much of his literary and community work: being the son of a Bataan Death March survivor and a Chavacano from Zamboanga whose heritage can be traced back to 333 years of Spanish colonization.

== Education ==
Born and raised in Manila, Philippines, Realuyo spent most of his adult life in New York City. In Manila, he attended elementary and highschool in University of Santo Tomas, Asia's oldest university. In 2003, UST High School named him as one of the 75 recipients of its 75th Founding Anniversary Award.

Realuyo has a Bachelor of Arts in International Studies from American University School of International Service in Washington, D.C., where he was awarded a Who's Who in American Colleges and Universities, and from Universidad Argentina de la Empresa in Buenos Aires, Argentina. He holds a Master's of Education degree with a focus on educational technology, non-profit management, and innovation from Harvard University, where he also served as a Social Entrepreneurship Fellow at John F. Kennedy School of Government's Center for Public Leadership.

Realuyo is a world traveler, with deep interest in the nexus of cultures, socio-political history, and languages. His major in college lead him to travel and study in the U.S. and South America. He studied in Buenos Aires, Argentina a few years after the military dictatorship ended. Fluent in Spanish, he has traveled extensively throughout Latin America and the Caribbean, tracing the historical forces of colonialism that shaped his matrilineal heritage. He is multilingual, proficient in Tagalog and Spanish and with limited proficiency in Brazilian Portuguese for having traveled and lived briefly in different cities of Brazil.

== Early Literary Publications ==
His acclaimed debut novel, The Umbrella Country, published in 1999 by Random House was included in Booklist's Top Ten First Novels of 1999, and remains in print after almost three decades. Upon release, the novel reached the #2 spot in the Philippines. The Umbrella Country was also a nominee for the Barnes & Noble Discover Great Writers Award 1999 and a recipient of the first Asian American "Members' Choice" Literary Award in the year 2000. According to The New York Times Book Review, "Realuyo's lucid prose, unencumbered by sentimentality or hindsight, lends freshness to the conflicts of his somewhat familiar characters and color to a setting both impoverished and alluring." The San Francisco Chronicle called Umbrella Country, "a significant contribution to Filipino American literature." Realuyo's first novel was also highly acclaimed in his home country, the Philippines, and has continued to be taught in colleges and universities since its publication in 1999. In a Manila Standard review,

This is a dangerous book because it reveals the Filipino soul, tortured, tormented by poverty . . . Everything in this book has the sting of reality. The images are stunning but true. The smells are so strong they assault the reader. The people are familiar characters we have met in the comings and goings, ups and downs of our city lives: They may be stereotypes and archetypes, but you know them all, they were part of each of our past and they're still very much around, 30 years after Gringo's recollection.

Realuyo's first poetry collection, The Gods We Worship Live Next Door, won the 2005 Agha Shahid Ali Prize in Poetry, selected by Grace Schulman, professor of English at City University of New York and poetry editor of The Nation. It was released by the University of Utah Press in March 2006. The Philippine edition of The Gods We Worship Live Next Door was released by Anvil Press in the Philippines in March 2008, marking his very first book publication in his birth country. The Gods We Worship Live Next Door received a 2009 Philippine National Book Award. In 2019, the Irish band U2 featured his poem "Filipineza" in its 30th anniversary concert tour of The Joshua Tree in Manila.

In Spring 2000, he guest edited The Literary Review's special issue on contemporary Filipino and Filipino-American literature, Am Here: Contemporary Filipino Writings in English. He is also the editor of The NuyorAsian Anthology: Asian American writings about New York City, a collection commemorating 100 years of Asian American presence in New York City. The anthology was published by the Asian American Writers' Workshop and Temple University Press in 1999. The NuyorAsian Anthology is a collection of fiction, poetry, essays, and art. The anthology maps Asian American life in New York City, beginning with works by poet Jose Garcia Villa in the 1930s and the birth of the Asian-American literary and political movement in the 1970s. The collection also explores the more contemporary voices of Pico Iyer, Bharati Mukherjee, Henry Chang, Xu Xi, Maxine Hong Kingston, Kimiko Hahn, Vijay Seshadri, Betty T. Kao, Wang Ping, and many others. Ranging in age from 16 to 87, more than sixty writers and artists look at love and loss, work and history, identity and sexuality, loneliness and dislocation, giving a closer look at the most diverse ethnic community in the United States.

Realuyo began his writing through his plays and poetry in elementary school in Manila, where he wrote in his native language Pilipino (Tagalog), but later shifted to English when his family immigrated to the United States when he was a teenager. Since co-founding Asian American Writers' Workshop in 1991, he has been publishing in literary journals, magazines and anthologies in the United States including The Nation, Mānoa: A Pacific Journal of International Writing, North American Review, ZYZZYVA's Resistance Issue, The Literary Review, Mid-American Review, The Missouri Review, New Letters, and The Kenyon Review. The opening poem in The Gods We Worship Live Next Door, Filipineza, originally published in The Nation, is widely anthologized in collections, such as the Norton Anthology Language for a New Century and Fire in the Soul: 100 Poems for Human Rights. The poem's inclusion in U2's The Joshua Tree anniversary concert tour received much media attention and highlighted the plight of Filipino domestics in Asia, the Middle East, and Europe.

== Social Justice and Community Work ==
Realuyo’s dedication to social change, both in his literary work and professional life, is rooted in his experiences living under dictatorship and Martial Law in the Philippines, as well as his exposure to the harsh realities of post-military rule while studying in Argentina. He also draws deep inspiration from the life histories of his parents. His father, the late Augusto Roa Realuyo, an architect and engineer, was a survivor of the Bataan Death March and Japanese Concentration Camps in the Philippines during World War II. His completed literary manuscript "What Tied Is Tied" was inspired by his father's experiences during World War II, from President Franklin D. Roosevelt's recruitment of young Filipinos into the U.S. Army in 1941 through the terrors of the Bataan Death March and Japanese Camps to the denial of their war-time benefits as a result of the approval by the U.S. Congress of the Rescission Act of 1946. His mother, Virginia A. Realuyo, comes from a mestizo Chavacano family in Zamboanga, a former Spanish stronghold in Mindanao. She descends from the interracial unions between Spaniards and native Filipinos dating back to the early 18th century, which gave rise to Chavacano—the only Spanish-based creole language in Asia.

As a community organizer and adult educator, Realuyo has worked for community and union-related organizations in New York City. After receiving his degree and briefly traveling in Europe, he returned to his lifelong passion of creative writing and co-founded The Asian American Writers Workshop in 1991 and dedicated his work life to community organizing and immigrant adult education in New York City's disenfranchised communities.

For the past thirty years, he has juggled a writing life and a demanding full-time job in education management. As an educator, he believes in Freirian pedagogical approaches to engaging the marginalized—teaching the word by teaching the world. His specialization is the integration of technology and workforce education into adult education. While in the graduate technology program at Harvard, he created We Speak America, an English Language podcast for adult learners, a project that won Harvard's business plan award.

== Awards, Citations, and Subsequent Literary Works ==
Among his numerous literary awards and fellowships are a Van Lier Foundation Fellowship for poetry, the Lucille Medwick Memorial Award from Poetry Society of America, twice recipient (2000 and 2018) of a New York Foundation for the Arts Fellowship for fiction, an Urban Artist Initiative Grant for fiction, a Valparaiso Literary Fellowship for fiction, a Yaddo Fellowship for poetry, two Queens Council on the Arts Grant for fiction and poetry, and a 2009 Philippine National Book Award for The Gods We Worship Live Next Door.

He has recently completed three new manuscripts: a literary family saga, What Tied Is Tied (shortlisted for 2023 New York Foundation for the Arts Fellowship in fiction and recipient of his second Queens Council of the Arts grant for fiction), a collection of satirical stories about the Filipino-American experience in New York City, Funny Little Island People (recipient of an Urban Artist Initiative Grant and Realuyo's second New York Foundation for the Arts Fellowship in Fiction), a second collection of poems, #Rebel | Sonnets | (finalist of 2026 Dorset Prize and the Berkshire Prize). He is currently working on another poetry collection, The War Theory (recipient of Queens Council on the Arts Grant and a Yaddo Fellowship). Poems from his manuscript #Rebel | Sonnets | have appeared in The Georgia Review, Harvard Review, North American Review, ZYZZYVA, Painted Bride Quarterly, The Missouri Review Poem of the Week, Salamander, Another Chicago Magazine, The Common and in the Academy of American Poets Poem-a-Day.
