= Evalyn Bates =

American educator (1907–2010)

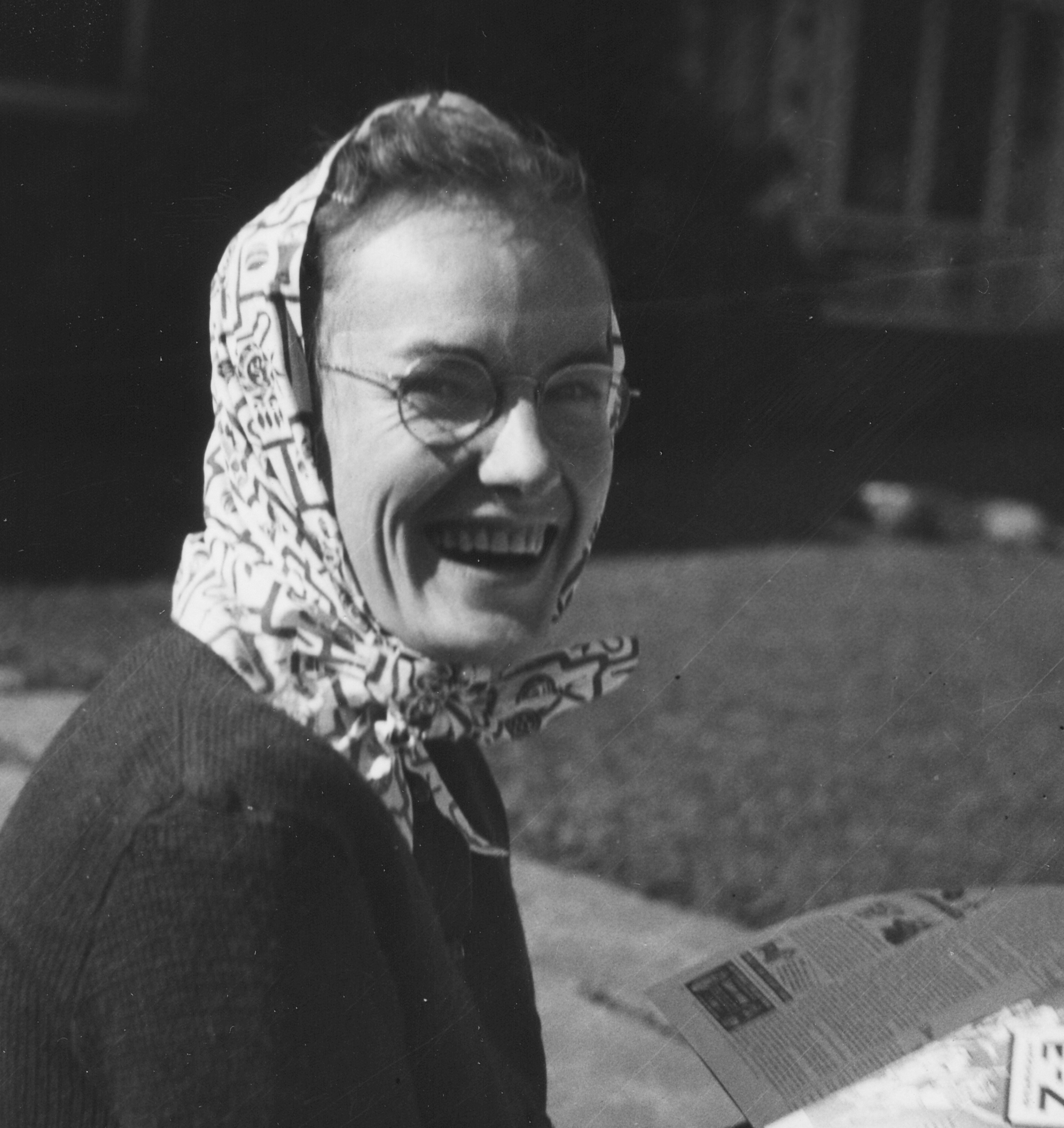
- Bates in 1938
- Born: 1907; Williamstown, Vermont, U.S.
- Died: 2010 (aged 102–103)
- Education: Goddard College; University of Chicago
- Occupation: Educator

Evalyn Cora Bates (1907–2010) was an American educator who helped found Goddard College in Plainfield, Vermont.

== Early life and education ==
Born in Williamstown, Vermont, in 1916 to a Vermont subsistence farmer and his Vermont-born wife, Evalyn Cora Bates was the middle-born of five children. Her parents valued education and encouraged their children to express their views on politics, current affairs and other matters in family discussions. Bates attended the University of Vermont for a year, ultimately graduated from Goddard Junior College, which Royce Pitkin ran as a division of Goddard Seminary in Barre, Vermont.

== Career ==
While at Goddard Junior College, Bates worked as secretary to Pitkin, beginning a long and productive working relationship. A year after her graduation, Goddard Seminary closed. When Goddard reincarnated as a four-year college in Plainfield in 1938, Bates was among those who worked to get the new enterprise off the ground. At the fledgling four-year college, she continued her studies and, in 1943, was one of the first two graduates of Goddard College, as we know it today. Her senior study was “Two Projects in Adult Education.”

Following her graduation from Goddard, she continued to work for the college, as President Pitkin's secretary. In 1957, she earned her master's degree at the University of Chicago. Her thesis, “Development of the Goddard College Adult Education Program,” proposed five possible program designs. She continued to work at Goddard and to develop the idea of an adult program at the college. In 1958, Bates was awarded a Fulbright Lectureship and spent eight months in Australia assisting in the adult education department of the University of New England.

From 1960 to 1962, while Director of Adult Education and Community Services at Goddard College, Bates finalized the plans for the Adult Degree Program. In August 1963, Goddard formally introduced the Adult Degree Program, a first in higher education. Bates directed the first ADP residency in 1963 and continued to work for Goddard until 1970. Goddard College's current low-residency model is based on the Adult Degree Program designed by Bates in 1963. Bates continued to work to advance options for women, chairing the Governor's Commission on the Status of Women in Vermont in 1965.

After leaving Goddard, Bates became a director of Scandinavian Seminar which facilitated college students' studies abroad. She expanded the program to include European travel for older adults in partnership with Elderhostel and the program became very successful.

== Death and legacy ==
On September 30, 2012, Goddard College President Barbara Vacarr presented Bates’ niece and surviving colleagues with a posthumous honorary doctorate degree to recognize Bates's contributions to higher education saying "[T]his day is about righting a wrong, about telling a woman's story that is long overdue."
