= John Kasiewicz =

- Born: 1976
- Origin: United States
- Genres: Jazz, rock, ambient, film score
- Occupations: Musician, composer
- Instruments: Guitar, bass

John Kasiewicz (born 1976) is an American guitarist and composer. He is known as a member of the improvisational jazz trio Raisinhill, the ambient duo 5turns25, and as a longtime collaborator with Phish drummer Jon Fishman in J. Willis Pratt & We're Bionic.

== Early life and education ==
Kasiewicz studied composition with the American composer Ernie Stires while attending Goddard College, joining a list of Stires's students that includes Trey Anastasio of Phish.

== Career ==
=== Raisinhill ===
Kasiewicz was a founding member of the Connecticut-based improvisational jazz trio Raisinhill. The group was featured as Jambands.com’s "New Groove of the Month" in March 2003, and he gave a lengthy interview to State of Mind Music in November 2003 discussing the band’s development.

Raisinhill was nominated for a Jammy Award in the "New Groove" category in 2004 and was one of the winners of Relix magazine’s Jam Off! competition in 2004.

=== Collaboration with Jon Fishman ===
Kasiewicz has collaborated with Phish drummer Jon Fishman as bass guitarist in the group J. Willis Pratt & We're Bionic. He appeared in the 2020 documentary When You Are Wild: A Day in the Life of J. Willis Pratt, which was covered by Live for Live Music.

In December 2022, he was a guest on the Phish-related podcast Undermine (part of the Under the Scales series), reflecting on his experience opening for Phish with J. Willis Pratt & We're Bionic in 1997.

=== 5turns25 ===
Kasiewicz is half of the ambient duo 5turns25. The group self-released several recordings and in 2011 issued the ambient album Evolution of the Human Heart on the San Francisco micro-label Time Released Sound. The album was praised by IglooMag for its evocative ambient folktronica sound. 5turns25 is also featured in the book Time Released Sound: A Decade of Music Packaging.

=== Film and television scoring ===
Kasiewicz has composed music for multiple films and shorts. See Filmography for selected works.

In 2010, he was selected as one of nine emerging composers for BMI’s “Composing for the Screen: A Film Scoring Mentorship Program,” directed by Rick Baitz in New York City.

Kasiewicz has also composed music for national television commercials, including campaigns for Xfinity and Philips Norelco.

== Discography ==
=== With Raisinhill ===
- Raisinhill (2002)

=== With J. Willis Pratt & We're Bionic ===
- Rhythm of the Sun (2000)

=== With 5turns25 ===
- Cloud Unfolded (2009)
- Evolution of the Human Heart (2011)

== Filmography ==
=== As composer ===
- Catching the Fever (2008)
- Hell’s Fury: Wanted Dead or Alive (2009)
- Driver’s Ed Mutiny (2010)
- The Movie Critic (2011)
- A Long Road (2011)
- Loop (2012)
- Puff (2016)
