= Suzi Wizowaty =

American politician

Member of the Vermont House of Representatives from the Chittenden-6-5 district
- In office January 2009 – January 2015
- Preceded by: Bill Keogh (D)
- Succeeded by: Mary Sullivan (D)

Personal details
- Born: January 6, 1954 (age 72) Cincinnati, Ohio, U.S.
- Party: Democratic
- Spouse: Joan Robinson
- Education: Princeton University (AB); Goddard College (MA)
- Profession: Writer
- Website: suziwizowaty.com

Susan Lyn "Suzi" Wizowaty (born January 6, 1954) is an American writer and politician from Burlington, Vermont. A Democrat, she was a member of the Vermont House of Representatives, representing the Chittenden-6-5 district in Burlington from 2009 to 2015. First elected in 2008, she did not run for re-election in 2014.

== Biography ==
Born in Cincinnati, Ohio, Wizowaty grew up in Europe, Texas and Connecticut, and graduated with an A.B. in anthropology from Princeton University in 1977 after completing a 91-page long senior thesis titled "Apple Days Delilah: A Justification for Fiction in Anthropology." She then received a M.A. from Goddard College in Plainfield, Vermont. She lived in San Francisco, Chicago, and New Jersey before moving to Burlington in 1985.

Wizowaty has worked as a bookseller, librarian, newspaper reporter and editor, also having experience in the non-profit sector with the Vermont Humanities Council and Vermont Works for Women. A published author, she has written three novels: The Round Barn (Hardscrabble, 2002) A Tour of Evil (Philomel, 2005), and The Return of Jason Green (Fomite, 2014).

In 2008, Wizowaty ran for the Vermont House of Representatives in the two-member Chittenden-3-5 district. She faced two incumbents in the Democratic primary but was the top vote-getter, beating Rep. Johannah Leddy Donovan, who finished in second place and Rep. Bill Keogh, who came third. In the general election held on November 4, the Democratic nominees – Wizowaty and Donovan – ran unopposed. She was re-elected to the House on November 2, 2010. Following redistricting, she was elected to represent the Chittenden 6-5 district in 2012. She did not seek re-election in 2014 and was succeeded by Mary Sullivan. In her first term, she was the only queer woman in the Vermont legislature.

In 2013, Wizowaty founded the non-profit Vermonters for Criminal Justice Reform, which she ran for four years before stepping down in July, 2017.
