= Taina Asili =

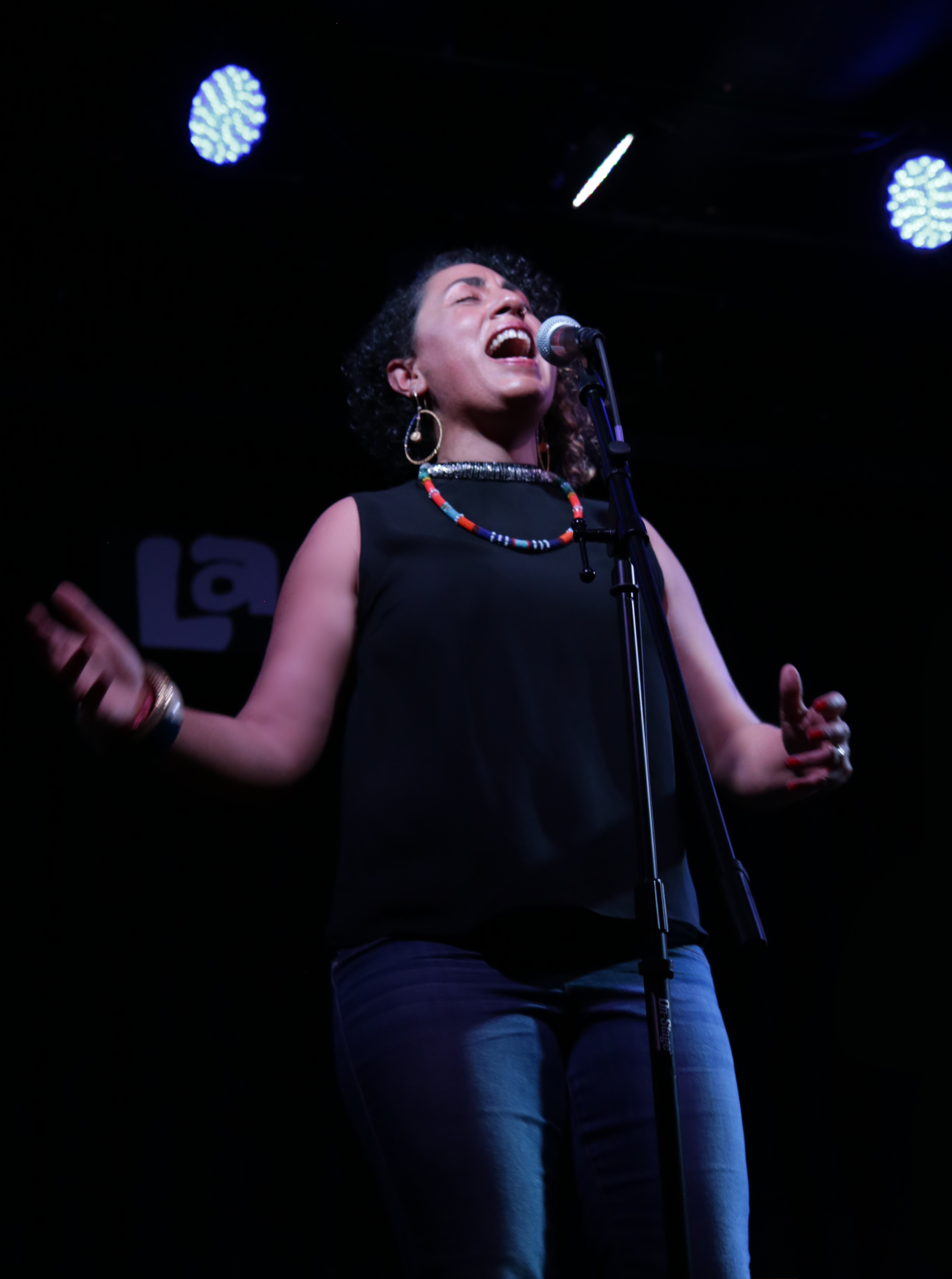
- Asili performing at La Peña in Berkeley, California in March of 2017

Background information
- Born: Taina Del Valle; Binghamton, New York, US
- Genres: Afro-Caribbean music flamenco hardcore punk
- Years active: 1995–present
- Website: tainaasili.com

Taína Asili is an American musician, singer, songwriter, poet, artist and activist. Born in Binghamton, New York to Puerto Rican parents, she first came to prominence in the late 1990s as the singer for the punk band Anti-Product, and later for her social justice themed music with the band Taina Asili y la Banda Rebelde. Asili’s musical career has spanned genres as diverse as Afro-Caribbean music, flamenco, hardcore punk and opera, and her art is driven by her work on prisoner justice, climate justice and food justice.

== Early life and career ==
Asili was born Taina Del Valle in Binghamton, New York. Her grandparents were from Puerto Rico, and her parents Mimi and Louie Del Valle were born and raised in New York City. The Del Valles cofounded the Latin American Student Union at Binghamton University influenced by social movements of their time, including the Black Panthers and Malcolm X, and later went on to work in fields supporting people in accessing higher education. The Del Valles were also a musical family, and raised Taína and her sister Ayana on Latin and Afro-Caribbean music and dance, particularly the Puerto Rican styles of bomba, plena and salsa. Louie Del Valle also led a Latin jazz band, sang in a street corner doo wop group, and played the conga, an instrument that Asili would later incorporate into her own musical projects. At the age of nine she also began studying opera with local voice teacher Alma Mora and trained in musical theatre until the age of 20.

As a young person Asili was one of the few people of color attending her predominantly white school and endured racist and homophobic abuse from some of her peers. While in high school she discovered punk rock, and in it found an outlet to express resistance to the dominant cultural norms of her surroundings. At the age of 16 Asili joined the hardcore punk band Anti-Product. The group played their first gig in 1995 with Asili initially sharing vocal duties with two other members. She continued to perform, tour and record with them while still in high school, and then while attending SUNY Binghamton. In the band's lyrics and between-song dialogues Asili spoke about the U.S. Military occupation of Vieques, Puerto Rican political prisoners, beauty standards that women of color face under white heteropatriarchy, and other topics typically marginalized by both mainstream culture and punk counter-culture. Asili also played congas and read poetry in the band and became known for her open critique of racism, sexism and homophobia with the North American punk scene.

During their career Anti-Product released two EPs and an LP and relocated to Philadelphia before breaking up in 2002. While living in Philadelphia Asili became active in the spoken word scene and attended a low-residency master's program in Transformative Language Arts at Goddard College. She performed alongside poets Sonia Sanchez and Ursula Rucker and briefly in mixed-media group the Shadow Poets. Asili also collaborated with Nuyorican anarchist punk/hip-hop fusion band Ricanstruction in the early 2000s.

== Current work ==
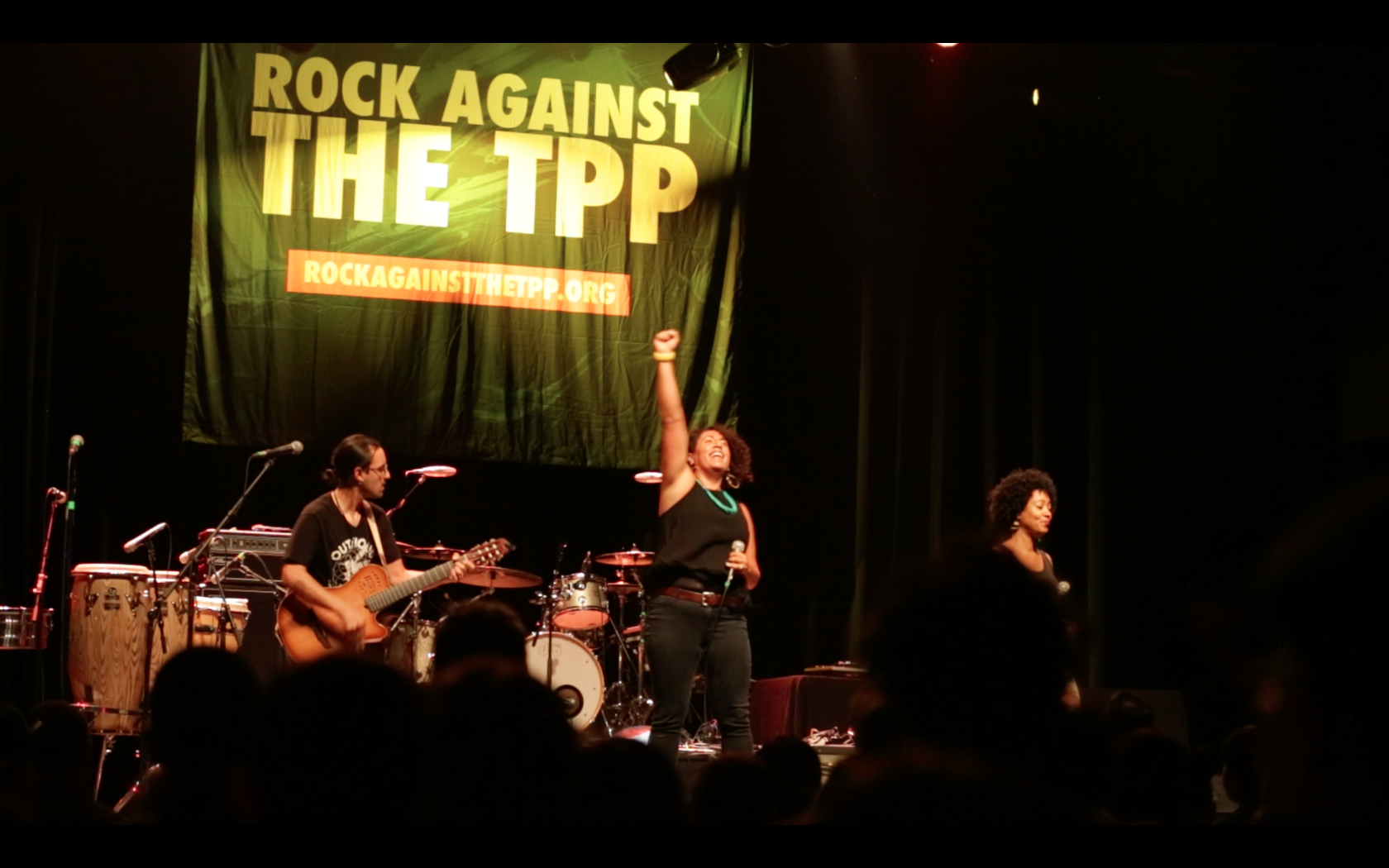
Taina Asili Y La Banda Rebelde performing at a Rock Against The TPP concert in 2019

After Asili's parents died in 2005 and 2007, she moved to Albany, New York and started a new group, Taína Asili Y La Banda Rebelde, with her partner Gaetano Vaccaro. Asili explained in an interview, "I needed to heal through my art with this tremendous loss, and at the same time, this amazing guitarist and love came into my life." The band's 2010 album, War Cry, included many songs celebrating Asili's parents and their history, and fused Afro-Caribbean, reggae, rock and hip hop sounds played by musicians with roots from Puerto Rico, Sicily, Greece, Spain, Brazil and Ghana. Writing for Albany's Metroland newspaper, journalist Josh Potter called the album "a pan-global roots-musical mélange that appeals to the struggle of tradition to envision a world of social justice."

In 2014 Taína Asili y la Banda Rebelde released their second album Fruit of Hope, which infused samba, rumba, ska, flamenco and African music rhythms into the group's sound. The album included guest performances from Naima Penniman of the duo Climbing PoeTree, Brazilian vocalist Eliane Pinheiro, and North Indian tabla percussionist Devesh Chandra. In 2016, La Banda Rebelde released a music video for the album's song "Freedom", and it quickly became an anthem for the Black Lives Matter movement. Asili had written the song after reading Michelle Alexander's book The New Jim Crow: Mass Incarceration in the Age of Colorblindness, saying, "I was floored by how she articulated connections to the disproportionate number of black people incarcerated with the history of slavery, white supremacy and racism in this country." The song also features guest vocals from Chicano rapper Michael Reyes. The lyrics to "Freedom" were later published in the Iris Morales book Latinas: Struggles & Protest in 21st Century USA.

Asili and her band have performed at many social justice events and protests, offering their music as a tool for social change. In 2015, Asili joined riot-folk musician Evan Greer on a tour across Europe seeking to give visibility to queer artists. Entitled "Break the Chains", Asili and Greer's tour was an extension of the monthly gender-queer liberation dance party Greer hosts in Boston. In 2016 Asili participated in and helped organize the Rock Against The TPP tour, joining Tom Morello from Rage Against the Machine, Evangeline Lilly, Talib Kweli, La Santa Cecilia, Jello Biafra, and Hari Kondabolu on a nationwide tour to stop the Trans-Pacific Partnership. Asili's sister, Ayana Del Valle, sometimes sings with La Banda Rebelde in addition to having her own music career under the name Ayana D.

In January 2017 Asili performed at DisruptJ20, a day of actions to protest the inauguration of Donald Trump in Washington, DC, and at The Women’s March on Washington the following day, joining Toshi Reagon, Madonna, Alicia Keys, Janelle Monae, Angelique Kidjo, Naomi Judd and other prominent artists and activists. Hearing speeches by Angela Davis and Janet Mock and performing for the huge, politically galvanized crowd inspired Asili. In an interview with Rolling Stone she said, "When I looked out at the audience of almost one million marchers, I felt a sense of hope like I hadn't felt in a long time. I felt compelled to take the energy I received from that day and turn it into a song to offer for this movement." The result was the single, "No Es Mi Presidente" ("He Is Not My President") whose bilingual lyrics unite the movements for immigrant rights, the Dakota Access Pipeline protests, Black Lives Matter and women-led organizing, meanwhile decrying Donald Trump's track record. The song's music video was released on International Women's Day in 2017 for the Day Without a Woman general strike. Later that year Asili curated the album ¡Viva Puerto Rico! as a benefit for survivors of Hurricane Maria. The album featured tracks by Talib Kweli, Lila Downs, Ana Tijoux, Hurray for the Riff Raff, Downtown Boys, Immortal Technique, as well as Asili's song "Sofrito" remixed by Public Enemy's DJ Johnny Juice. Since its release 100% of the album's proceeds have gone to hurricane relief in Puerto Rico.

In 2019 Asili released her third album with La Banda Rebelde, entitled Resiliencia, and took part in "Soul Mechanism: A Concert Celebrating the Music of Migrations" at Carnegie Hall. Aside from touring and performing at festivals and benefit concerts, Asili's music has also been featured on National Public Radio, Democracy Now! and at TEDxGreenville.

== Other musical projects ==
In 2009 Asili and Vaccaro began researching the roots of flamenco music and dance in residency with musicians in Spain, drawing threads to flamenco's influences on their own Mediterranean and Caribbean heritages. The duo occasionally perform as Asili & Vaccaro, often accompanied by flamenco dancers, including April Goltz who, along with Asili, was a member of the punk band Anti-Product.

In 2017 Asili began a collaboration with Indian musician Veena Chandra for which the two women won a New Music USA award. In 2018 Asili drew upon her early training in opera and musical theatre when she played the role of Abuela Claudia in the Schenectady Light Opera Company's production of Lin-Manuel Miranda's musical In the Heights. Preview showings of the production raised funds for hurricane relief efforts in Puerto Rico.

== Documentary and directing work ==
In 2017 Asili launched the podcast Rhythm of Rebellion in which she interviews social change performing artists from all over the world. Guests have included Madigan Shive, Charlotte Hill O'Neal, Sammus, Tef Poe, Rebel Diaz and Immortal Technique speaking on topics such as Standing Rock, music as medicine, protest poetry, the legacy of Martin Luther King Jr., and the Women's March on Washington.

Asili wrote and directed music videos for her songs: "Freedom" (2014), "And We Walk" (2016), and "No Es Mi Presidente" (2017), which premiered in Rolling Stone on International Women’s Day. In 2018, four months after Hurricanes Irma and Maria hit Puerto Rico, Asili travelled there to conduct interviews with four women artists and activists for her documentary Resiliencia, about Puerto Rico’s resiliency in response to the storms. The documentary premiered in October of that year. With the release of her 2019 album, also titled Resiliencia, Asili started to make "music video documentaries" for the album's songs, each drawn from footage of women she interviewed. The first of these, "Plant the Seed," was released in advance of the album and highlighted food justice farmer and educator Leah Penniman and Soul Fire Farm in Upstate New York.

== Activism ==
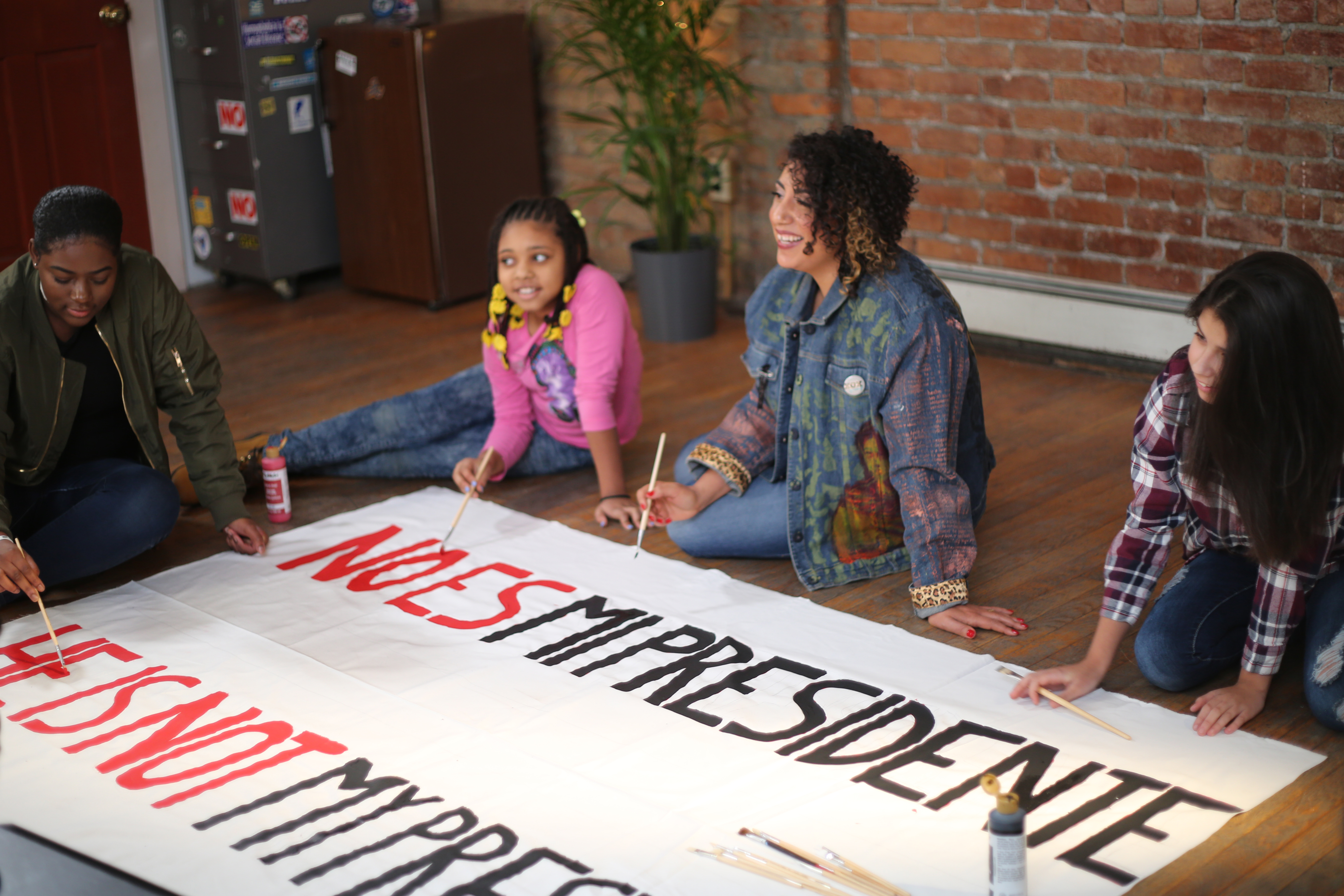
Taina Asili painting a banner for "No Es Mi Presidente" ("He Is Not My President") with friends in early 2017

Asili's move to Philadelphia was prompted by her work organizing on behalf of political prisoners, particularly The Move 9 and Mumia Abu Jamal. After relocating to Albany, she helped found the New York State Prisoner Justice Network, as well as the Arts In Action Committee for Capital Area Against Mass Incarceration whose members have appeared in one of her music videos. Asili is on the board of directors for Soul Fire Farm in Grafton, New York, whose farmers work to combat racial disparity in the food system. Asili also teaches social-justice songwriting workshops open to people both with or without musical training, and does public speaking on social change issues.

== Awards ==
In 2005, Asili received the Leeway Foundation’s Transformation Award, which honors the work of women artists who are greatly impacting their world with their art. In 2015 The Hispanic Coalition NY recognized Asili as one of their 40 under 40 Rising Stars. In 2016 Asili received the Jimmy Perry Progressive Leadership Award from Citizen Action NY. In 2017 Asili was honored by the City of Albany’s Commission on Human Rights.

== Discography ==
=== With La Banda Rebelde ===
- War Cry CD (2010)
- Fruit of Hope CD (2014)
- "No Es Mi Presidente" single (2017)
- ¡Viva Puerto Rico! compilation (2017)
- Resiliencia (2019)

=== With Ricanstruction ===
- Love+Revolution (2004)

=== With Anti-Product ===
- Another Day Another War EP (1996)
- Big Business and the Government Are Both the Fucking Same EP (1997)
- The Deafening Silence of Grinding Gears LP (1999)
- The EPS of AP compilation CD (2002)

== Filmography ==
=== Music videos ===
- "Freedom" (2014)
- "And We Walk" (2016)
- "No Es Mi Presidente" (2017)
- "Plant The Seed" (2019)

=== Documentaries ===
- Resiliencia (2018)
