= Pamela Stewart =

American poet (born 1946)

- Born: 1946 (age 79–80); Boston, Massachusetts
- Education: Goddard College (BA); University of Iowa (MFA)
- Spouse: Ed Cothey (m. 1983; div. 2016)
- Writing career
- Genre: Poetry
- Notable awards: Guggenheim Fellowship

Pamela Stewart (born 1946) is an American poet.

== Life ==
Stewart was born in Boston, Massachusetts and graduated from Goddard College with a BA, and from the University of Iowa with a MFA. Her work appeared in Seneca Review, and Calyx.

== Family ==
She married Ed Cothey in 1983; they lived in Cornwall, and in Hawley, Massachusetts, divorcing in 2016.

== Awards ==
- 1982 Guggenheim Fellowship

== Works ==
- "white moon"; "Nothing New Under the Gun", Salt River Review
- The St. Vlas Elegies (L’Epervier Press, 1977) OCLC 3508401
- Cascades (L’Epervier Press, 1979) OCLC 805852360
- Nightblind Raccoon, 1985, ISBN 978-0-918518-47-7
- Infrequent Mysteries Alice James Books, 1991, ISBN 978-0-914086-86-4
- The Red Window University of Georgia Press, 1997, ISBN 978-0-8203-1894-3

=== chapbook ===
- Half-tones, Maguey Press, 1978, ISBN 978-0-930778-06-4
- The Ghost Farm Pleasure Boat Studio 2010. ISBN 9781929355662, OCLC 659770488

=== Anthologies ===
- Strong measures: contemporary American poetry in traditional forms, Editors: Philip Dacey, David Jauss, Harper & Row, 1986, ISBN 978-0-06-041471-9
- Orpheus & Company: contemporary poems on Greek mythology, Editor: Debora de Nicola, University Press of New England, 1999, ISBN 978-0-87-451918-1

== Sources ==
- "Or Yours to Keep: The Poetry of Pamela Stewart", Where the angels come toward us: selected essays, reviews & interviews, David St. John, White Pine Press, 1995, ISBN 978-1-877727-46-7
- "Interview With Pamela Stewart - Judge of the Things To Come Poetry Prize - Shape&Nature Press". shapeandnature.com.
