= Jacqueline Berger =

American poet

- Born: Jacqueline Lisa Berger; November 30, 1960 (age 65)
- Occupations: Poet, educator
- Website: www.jacquelineberger.com

Jacqueline Lisa Berger (born November 30, 1960) is an American poet and director of the graduate English program at Notre Dame de Namur University (NDNU) in California. She is the author of three books of narrative poetry: The Mythologies of Danger (1997), Things That Burn (2005), and The Gift That Arrives Broken (2010). Her work is concerned with the themes of desire and loss.

== Biography ==
Berger was born in Los Angeles and received her BA in English from Goddard College in 1982. She studied under Olga Burmas and Jane Miller at Goddard, and later became interested in free writing and attended the Freehand Women's Writing Community in Massachusetts. Berger obtained her MFA from Mills College in 1995.

Since the late 1990s, she has been the program director for the Master of Arts in English at NDNU in Belmont, California. Berger is also an assistant professor and director of the writing center at NDNU and teaches writing at City College of San Francisco. She draws inspiration from the dependent relationship between her teaching and writing career: "I really adore teaching, and it certainly inspires me. And I couldn’t teach writing if I didn't write. So the two certainly work together."

In the mid-2000s, she participated in the Changing Lives Through Literature program, teaching prisoners at the San Mateo Women's Correctional Facility.

She married technical writer Jeffrey Erickson in 2004.

== Poetry ==
Her poetry has been published in two anthologies of American literature: "Grandfather" was included in On the Verge: Emerging Poets and Artists (1995); "Getting to Know Her", "The Gun", and "Between Worlds" were published in American Poetry: The Next Generation (2000). Berger's poems have also appeared in Poetry Flash, Rhino Poetry and River Styx Magazine.

Her first book of poetry, The Mythologies of Danger (1997), won the Bluestem Poetry Award and the Bay Area Book Reviewers Association Award. American author Alberto Ríos, the final judge at the Bluestem competition, described Mythologies of Danger as "poems of immediate human energy and willful edge...Always bold but always thoughtful too...a smart, compelling move into the speaker's world of charged moments, sparks, which here are always dangerous and ingenuously engaging."

Things That Burn (2005), her second book of poetry, was awarded the 2004 Agha Shahid Ali Prize in Poetry by Mark Strand, United States Poet Laureate (1990–1991). It was published by the University of Utah Press. In Things That Burn, Berger uses narrative poetry to explore the ambient nature of feeling: "I want to use both story and language to enter the place where experience is atmospheric—the blue or red smoke of the soul, if you will."

Her third book, The Gift That Arrives Broken (2010), won the Autumn House Poetry Award. The title originates from a deleted line in a poem that reflected a new closeness with her family at a time when her mother and father were both ill.

== Style ==
Berger is an advocate of the free writing technique for generating initial ideas in a notebook followed later by a separate, secondary process of using the computer to shape and refine the poem. She believes that the writing process is similar to the dream experience that occurs during sleep. For Berger, the writer doesn't consciously choose a topic to write about in as much as the material simply comes when the time is right:

We don't go to bed at night with an idea of what we're going to dream about. It's a very strange and mysterious and unconscious process...you have weird dreams that appear out of left field and we don't control it. I really do think that writing is much the same. I generate all my material through free writing, which is pouring things out in a notebook. And I just don't know what's going to pop-out.

== Selected works ==
- "At the Holiday Crafts Fair". The Iowa Review. 35 (3). University of Iowa: 57–58. Winter 2005–2006. ISSN 0021-065X.
- "Gin". The Iowa Review. 35 (3). University of Iowa: 59–60. Winter 2005–2006. ISSN 0021-065X.
- "The Weight of Blood". The Iowa Review. 35 (3). University of Iowa: 61–62. Winter 2005–2006. ISSN 0021-065X.
- "The Routine After Forty". Paterson Literary Review. 291 (2). Passaic County Community College: 6. Mar–Apr 2006. ISSN 0029-2397.
- "The Gift That Arrives Broken". Paterson Literary Review (35). Passaic County Community College: 318. 2006. ISSN 0743-2259.
- "What is There". Southern Poetry Review. 44 (1). Armstrong Atlantic State University: 10–11. 2006. ISSN 0038-447X.
