= Ernie Stires =

American classical composer

Ernest Stires (December 17, 1925 – May 4, 2008) was an American composer, musician, and mentor. His jazz-based classical music has been performed both throughout the United States and abroad.

Stires was born in Alexandria, Virginia, to a family of musicians. His maternal grandparents were the mezzo-soprano Louise Homer and the American art song composer Sidney Homer, while his cousin was the composer Samuel Barber. His paternal grandparents were Bishop Ernest Milmore Stires and Sarah Stires. He was educated first at the Episcopal High School in Alexandria and then at Harvard and Dartmouth, finally graduating from Trinity College in Connecticut. After service as a U.S. Navy pilot in World War II, Stires worked as a television advertising executive, first for NBC in California and then later for CBS in Boston. Although he had begun improvising jazz on the piano while still a small child, he did not devote himself to music as a career until 1962 when he studied composition with Nicolas Slonimsky and Francis Judd Cooke.

Ernie has three children: Sarah Stires, Ernie Stires, and Elizabeth Stires.

He moved to Vermont in 1967 where he was an administrator for the Vermont Symphony Orchestra and the Chamber Music Conference and Composers' Forum of the East and one of the founding members of the Consortium of Vermont Composers. He also worked as a volunteer teaching basic music theory and composition to young musicians in his community. Amongst his students were Trey Anastasio, a member of the band Phish, film composer/guitarist John Kasiewicz, composer/sound-artist Rama Gottfried, and Jamie Masefield of the Jazz Mandolin Project. Stires' electric guitar concerto, Chat Rooms, was written expressly for Anastasio who premiered it in 2001 with the Vermont Youth Orchestra under Troy Peters, an event covered on national television. In 2004, his violin concerto was premiered at Carnegie Hall in New York in a performance by the Vermont Youth Orchestra with Ruotao Mao, first violinist of the Amabile Quartet, as the soloist.

Ernie Stires died in Vermont on May 4, 2008, at the age of 82.
