= Goddard College =

Private liberal arts college in Vermont, United States

- Former names: Green Mountain Central Institute & Goddard Seminary
- Type: Private
- Active: 1863; 163 years ago–June 2024
- Location: Plainfield, Vermont, United States; 44.2789°N 72.4394°W
- Campus: Rural 175 acres (71 ha)
- Colors: Blue and white
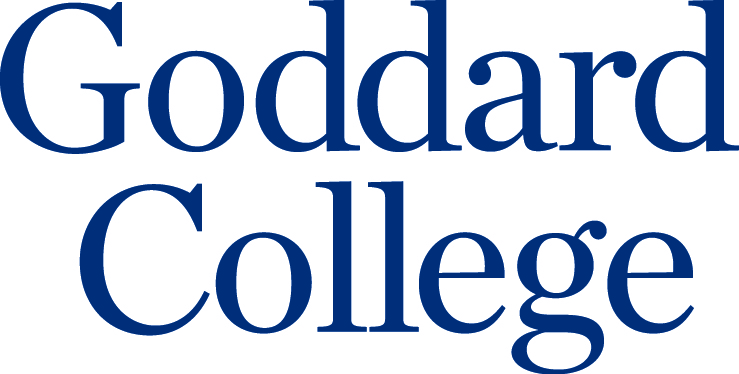

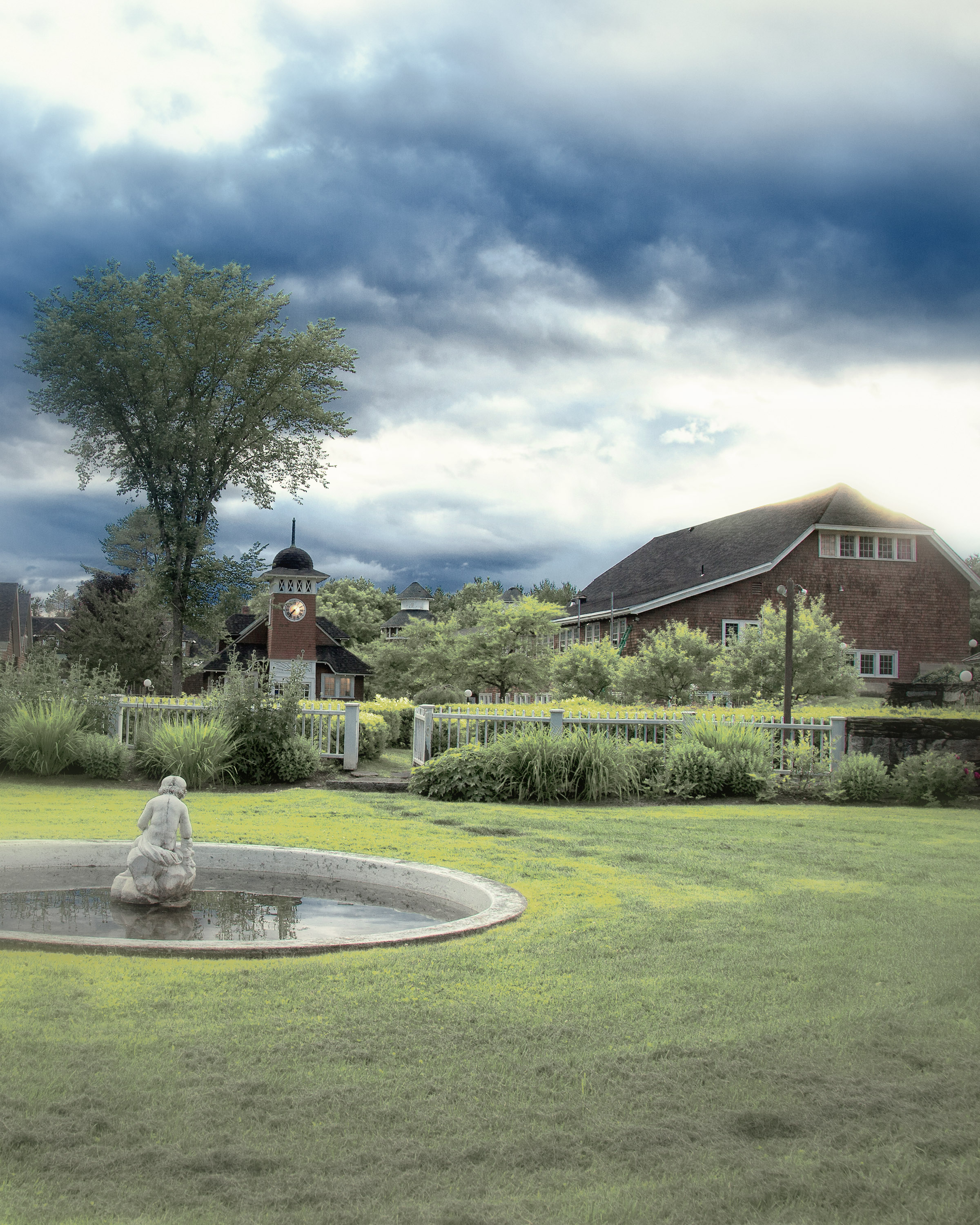
Goddard College's Greatwood Campus in Plainfield, Vermont

Goddard College was a private college with three locations in the United States: Plainfield, Vermont; Port Townsend, Washington; and Seattle. The college offered undergraduate and graduate degree programs. With predecessor institutions dating to 1863, Goddard College was founded in 1938 as an experimental and non-traditional educational institution based on the idea that experience and education are intricately linked.

For many years, Goddard College provided a mix of residential, low-residency, and distance-learning programs. Its intensive low-residency model was first developed for its MFA in Creative Writing Program in 1963.

In April 2024, Goddard announced that the college would close at the end of the spring semester, due to financial issues and a decline in enrollment. The college was accredited by the New England Commission of Higher Education.

== History ==
Goddard College began in 1863 in Barre, Vermont, northeast of Middlebury as the Green Mountain Central Institute. In 1870, it was renamed Goddard Seminary in honor of Thomas A. Goddard (1811–1868) and his wife Mary (1816–1889). Goddard was a prominent merchant in Boston, and was one of the school's earliest and most generous benefactors.

Founded by Universalists, Goddard Seminary was originally a four-year preparatory high school, primarily affiliated with Tufts College in eastern Massachusetts. For many years the seminary prospered. Many public high schools opening in the 20th century made many of the private New England academies obsolete. Attempting to save it, the trustees added a Junior College to the seminary in 1935, with a seminary graduate, Royce S. "Tim" Pitkin, as president.

In 1936, under his leadership, the seminary concluded that for Goddard to survive, an entirely new institution would need to be created. Many educators and laymen agreed with him. Pitkin was supported by Stanley C. Wilson, former governor of Vermont and chairman of the Goddard Seminary Board of Trustees; Senators George Aiken and Ralph Flanders; and Dorothy Canfield Fisher. Pitkin persuaded the board of trustees to embrace a new style of education, one substituting individual attention, democracy, and informality for the traditionally austere and autocratic educational model. On March 13, 1938, Goddard College was chartered. In July 1938 the newly formed Goddard College moved to Greatwood Farm in Plainfield, Vermont.

The new Goddard was an experimental and progressive college. For its first 21 years of operation, Goddard was unaccredited and small, but it built a reputation as one of the most innovative colleges in the country. An important part of Goddard was its use of discussion as the basic method in classroom teaching, its emphasis on the whole lives of students in determining personal curricula, its incorporation of practical work into the life of every student, and its development of the college as a self-governing learning community.

In 1959 Goddard College was accredited. One of the founding principles of Goddard was to provide educational opportunities for adults. There was a great need for a program for adults who had not completed college, to obtain degrees without disrupting their family lives or careers. The Adult Degree Program (ADP), created by Evalyn Bates, was established in 1963. It was the first low-residency adult education program in the country. Over the years many experimental programs were designed at Goddard. The programs included the Goddard Experimental Program for Further Education, Design Build Program, Goddard Cambridge Program for Social Change, Third World Studies Program, Institute for Social Ecology, Single Parent Program and many others.

Based on its use of narrative transcripts instead of traditional letter grades, as well as learner-designed curricula, Goddard was among the founding members of the Union for Experimenting Colleges and Universities.

In 2002, after 54 years, the college terminated its residential undergraduate degree program and became an exclusively low-residency college. In 2005, the college expanded to the West Coast and established a residency site in Port Townsend, Washington. In July 2011 Goddard began to offer their non-licensure education program in Seattle.

Goddard was placed on probation in 2018 by the New England Commission of Higher Education (NECHE) because of a perceived "[lack of] stability of executive leadership" and concerns about the college's financial resources. The probation was lifted in 2020 after the college satisfied the commission that it had rectified those issues. In January 2024, Goddard announced that it would temporarily end its low-residency programs in favor of online learning.

Goddard College closed at the end of the spring semester in 2024, due to a precipitious decline in enrollment from 1,900 in the 1970s to less than 250 in 2024. The main campus in Plainfield was put up for sale and in late May was announced to be under contract at a price of $3.4 million to an undisclosed buyer. A group of alumni and townspeople organized to attempt to block the sale. In early July 2024 the school announced it was for sale again, with no explanation of what had happened with the previous deal. On August 2, 2024, the college announced plans to sell the campus to a local group, the Greatwood Project, formed by college alumni and former faculty.

== Campuses ==
- Goddard College Greatwood Campus
- U.S. National Register of Historic Places
- U.S. Historic district
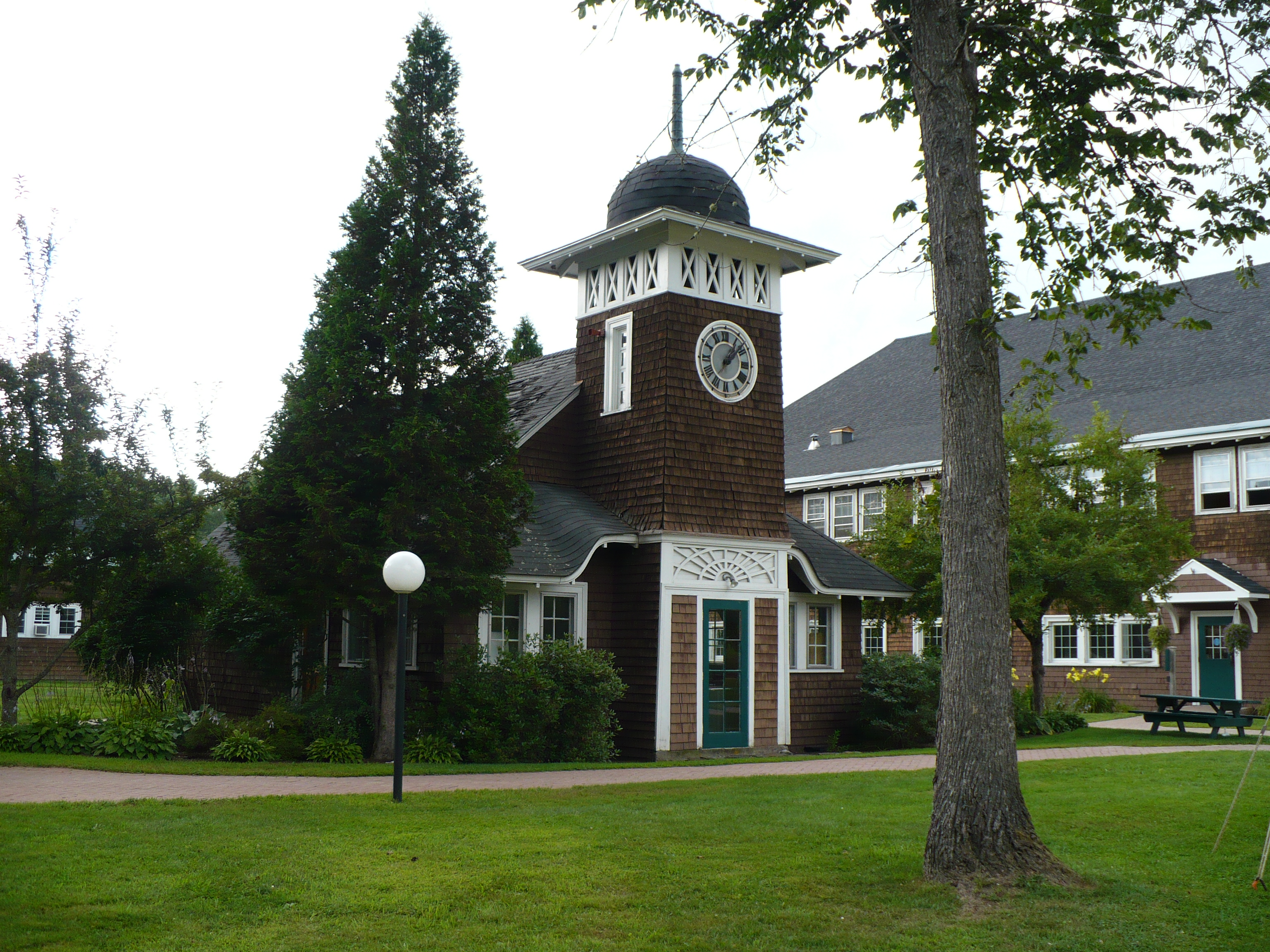
- Goddard College Clockhouse
- Area: 15 acres (6.1 ha)
- Built: 1908
- Architect: James T. Kelley; Arthur Asahel Shurcliff
- Architectural style: Shingle Style, Tudor Revival
- NRHP reference No.: 96000253
- Added to NRHP: March 7, 1996

=== Main campus, Greatwood: Plainfield, Vermont ===
The campus in Plainfield was founded in 1938 on the grounds of a late 19th-century model farm: The Greatwood Farm & Estate consisted of shingle-style buildings and gardens designed by Arthur Shurcliff. The Village of Learning, consisted of eleven dormitory buildings, was built adjacent to the ensemble of renovated farm buildings in 1963 to accommodate an increasing student population. The Pratt Center & Library, designed to be at the heart of a larger campus, was constructed in 1968. No other significant new construction were added after 1968.

On March 7, 1996, the Greatwood campus was recognized for its historic and architectural significance by its inclusion on the National Register of Historic Places.

=== Fort Worden State Park, Port Townsend, Washington campus ===
A U.S. Army post from 1902 to 1953, much of the fort was renovated and adapted as a year-round, multi-use facility dedicated to lifelong learning. It housed several organizations which comprise Fort Worden State Park. The fort was on a bluff overlooking the Strait of Juan de Fuca and Admiralty Inlet near Port Townsend, Washington.

=== Columbia City, Seattle campus ===
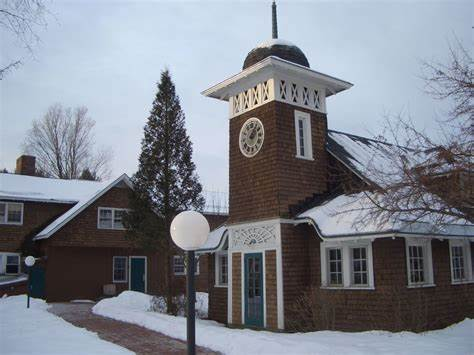
Goddard College in Plainfield

The MA in Education program, originally held in the Plainfield-based low-residency program, expanded in 2011 into Columbia City, a neighborhood in southeastern Seattle.

The program trained students in bilingual preschool education. Students focused on areas such as intercultural studies, dual language, early childhood, cultural arts, and community education, and created their plan of studies for each semester. The program was designed to serve students who could not leave their families and communities for the residency.

== Academics ==
Each Goddard student designed their own curriculum in accordance with their program's degree criteria. In addition to fulfilling academic criteria in the subjects of the arts, the humanities, mathematics, natural sciences and social sciences, undergraduate students needed to demonstrate critical thinking and writing, understanding of social and ecological contexts, positive self-development, and thoughtful action within their learning processes.

The college used a student self-directed, mentored system in which faculty issue narrative evaluations of student's progress instead of grades. The intensive low-residency model required that students come to campus every six months for approximately eight days. During this period, students engaged in a variety of activities and lectures from early morning until late in the evening, and created detailed study plans. During the semester, students studied independently, sending in "packets" to their faculty mentors every few weeks.

When low-residency education began at Goddard, packets were made up of paper documents sent via the mail. Since advances in the internet and related technology, in the 21st century most packets were sent electronically. They contained artwork, audio files, photography, video and web pages, in addition to writing. The schedule and format of these packets differed from program to program, and content varied with each student-faculty correspondence. The focus was generally on research, writing, and reflection related to each student's individualized study plan.

At regular intervals students compiled their work into "learning portfolios" to submit as part of a Progress Review before a cross-program board of faculty. The board ensured that all students' work was in compliance with the college's degree criteria. Undergraduates had to complete a yearlong Senior Study, accompanied by final graduating presentations of work, before being awarded a degree.

== Campus and facilities ==
The majority of the college property was in the town of Plainfield and the Plainfield census-designated place. A portion of the college property was in East Montpelier.

=== Eliot D. Pratt Center and Library ===
The Eliot D. Pratt Center and Library in Plainfield, Vermont, served the entire Goddard College community. It was also open to the public. Its holdings contained over 70,000 physical items. The building also housed several administrative offices, an Archives room with artifacts from the 1800s to present, an Art Gallery, and WGDR (91.1 FM), a college/community radio station serving Central Vermont since 1973.

=== Goddard College Community Radio (WGDR and WGDH) ===
Until 2021, Goddard was home to Goddard College Community Radio, a pair of community-based, non-commercial, listener-supported educational radio stations. WGDR, 91.1 FM, is licensed to Plainfield. Its sister station, WGDH, 91.7 FM, is licensed to Hardwick, Vermont east of Burlington. Goddard College Community Radio was the largest non-commercial community radio station in Vermont. On May 10, 2021, Goddard donated the licenses for WGDR and sister station WGDH to the Central Vermont Community Radio Corporation.

=== Haybarn Theatre ===
The building was a barn built in 1868 by the Martin Family and one of the largest barns in Central Vermont. The Haybarn was originally used to store hay, grain, and livestock. In 1938, when Goddard College purchased Greatwood Farm, they began the process of adapting the farm buildings into academic and student spaces. The Haybarn was renovated to provide a space for the performing arts.

For almost 75 years the Haybarn Theatre was a place where the local community and the college came together to enjoy and appreciate the arts. The Haybarn hosted educational conferences, student and community performances, and the Goddard College Concert Series. Prior to gaining widespread fame, Phish played multiple concerts there in 1986 and 1987.

== Notable events ==
=== Alternative Media Conference ===
In June 1970 Goddard hosted the Alternative Media Conference; it attracted more than 1,600 radio DJs and others involved in independent media from all over the United States. Featured presenters included Yippie founder Jerry Rubin; spiritual leader Ram Dass; and Larry Yurdin in addition to Danny Fields, Bob Fass, and Paul Krassner from The Realist, a magazine.

A music roster of up-and-coming bands was curated by Atlantic Records and included Dr. John and the J. Geils Band. The conference embodied both the political activism and the free-love atmosphere of the time: a coalition affiliated with Panther 21, The Guardian, Newsreel, Radio Free People, Liberation News Service, Media Women, and The New York Rat put together a packet highlighting the political side of alternative media.

A second Alternative Media Conference was held on campus in 2013 to commemorate the college's 150th anniversary. Thom Hartmann and Ellen Ratner were featured speakers.

=== 2014 undergraduate commencement ===
In October 2014, the graduating class of Goddard College's undergraduate program selected Mumia Abu-Jamal, a journalist, activist, and Goddard alumnus, as its commencement speaker. Abu-Jamal had attended Goddard in the 1970s and completed his Bachelor of Arts degree in 1996 while incarcerated. He was convicted in 1982 of the 1981 murder of Philadelphia police officer Daniel Faulkner and was serving a sentence of life imprisonment without parole.

The selection generated controversy. Faulkner's widow, Maureen Faulkner, criticized the invitation, as did U.S. Senator Pat Toomey, the Vermont Troopers Association, and other law enforcement organizations. Critics objected to the college providing a commencement platform to an individual convicted of murdering a police officer.

Goddard's interim president, Bob Kenny, defended the graduating students' right to select their speaker, describing the decision as consistent with the college's emphasis on independent and critical thinking. College representatives explained that students had selected Abu-Jamal because of his writing and advocacy concerning imprisonment, racial discrimination, and social justice.

On October 5, 2014, Abu-Jamal delivered a prerecorded video address to approximately 20 graduating students. His remarks addressed education, social responsibility, and the importance of working to improve society. A small group of protesters gathered outside the ceremony.

=== Financial difficulties and accreditation (2018–2020) ===
During the late 2010s, Goddard College experienced financial difficulties associated with declining enrollment, operating deficits, and institutional governance concerns.

In September 2018, the New England Commission of Higher Education (NECHE) placed Goddard on probation, citing deficiencies in institutional resources and governance. The college retained its accreditation and remained eligible for federal student financial aid during the probationary period.

Bernard Bull became president in November 2018 and implemented financial and organizational changes intended to stabilize the institution. These included efforts to reduce operating deficits, restructure academic programs, and address concerns identified by the accrediting commission.

In September 2020, NECHE removed Goddard from probation and continued its accreditation. According to a December 2020 report in Higher Ed Dive, the college had eliminated its operating deficit and enrolled approximately 372 students that fall, representing its first enrollment increase in several semesters.

=== Labor dispute and enrollment decline (2021–2023) ===
In 2021, Dan Hocoy became president of Goddard College, succeeding Bernard Bull. Despite the restoration of accreditation, the college continued to face declining enrollment and financial pressures. By 2021, student enrollment had fallen to approximately 360.

On March 24, 2023, approximately 35 members of the Goddard College Staff Union, affiliated with United Auto Workers Local 2322, began a strike following unsuccessful negotiations over wages, benefits, and employment conditions. Union representatives expressed concerns about compensation and proposed changes to management authority, while the administration maintained that it had offered wage increases and sought a negotiated settlement.

The strike ended on April 21, 2023, after 28 days. The resulting agreement included wage increases and additional paid time off, while excluding a proposed management-rights provision that had been disputed by the union.

=== Transition to online education and closure (2024) ===
In January 2024, Goddard College announced that it would temporarily discontinue its on-campus residency programs and transition to exclusively online instruction. The decision was attributed to declining participation in residency programs, increasing operating costs, and the financial burden of maintaining the campus. Approximately a dozen staff positions were expected to be eliminated as part of the restructuring.

On April 9, 2024, Goddard's board of trustees announced that the college would close at the end of the spring semester. The board cited declining enrollment, long-term financial difficulties, inflation, demographic changes, and shifting preferences in higher education.

At the time of the announcement, Goddard enrolled approximately 220 students, compared with more than 1,900 in the early 1970s and 538 in fall 2014. Financial records examined by Inside Higher Ed indicated that the institution had reported operating losses in seven of the ten most recent fiscal years for which records were available.

The college arranged for students to continue their studies at Prescott College in Arizona through a teach-out agreement that maintained their existing tuition rates. The board also announced plans to establish scholarship support for students affected by the closure.

=== Sale of the Plainfield campus (2024) ===
Following the closure announcement, Goddard's trustees sought to sell the college's main campus in Plainfield, Vermont. The proposed sale generated debate among alumni, former employees, and local residents concerning the future of the property and the preservation of the college's educational and cultural legacy.

Several organizations expressed interest in acquiring the campus, including Cooperation Vermont and the Greatwood Project. In August 2024, the college announced an agreement to sell the property to the Greatwood Project, a nonprofit initiative associated with alumni and community members. That agreement subsequently fell through when the organization was unable to secure the necessary financing.

In October 2024, Goddard announced a new purchase agreement with Execusuite LLC, a New Hampshire-based property redevelopment company owned by Mike Davidson, for approximately $3.4 million. Davidson stated that he intended to preserve the campus's historic structures and consult with local residents about potential future uses, including housing, arts programming, and community facilities.

=== Redevelopment of the former campus (2025–2026) ===
Following the acquisition of Goddard's former campus by Execusuite, redevelopment efforts focused on preserving the property's historic and cultural features while introducing new uses for its buildings and grounds.

In 2025, a nonprofit organization known as The Creative Campus at Goddard began developing programming and facilities intended to support arts, education, housing, and community activities. Former college facilities, including the Haybarn Theater, were repurposed for concerts, performances, retreats, and other public events.

By September 2026, the campus hosted arts organizations, educational workshops, event facilities, lodging, and community programs. The Creative Campus worked alongside independent organizations, including The Goddard Spark, which offered courses and educational residencies inspired by the former college's individualized learning model.

Although the former campus continued to host educational and cultural activities, Goddard College itself did not reopen as a degree-granting institution.

== Notable people associated with the college ==
=== Alumni ===
- Alan Briskin – organizational consultant
- Ann Gillespie – actor (Beverly Hills, 90210)
- Anna Lee Walters — author
- Archie Shepp – saxophonist
- Blakeley White-McGuire – Principal dancer of Martha Graham Dance Company
- Bradford Graves – sculptor, musician, professor (fine arts, sculpture)
- Cara Hoffman – novelist
- Caroline Finkelstein – poet
- Charlie Bondhus – poet
- Chris Spirou — politician
- Christine Palm — member of the Connecticut House of Representatives
- Christopher Dell - historian, author, literary critic, and employee at the Library of Congress
- Conrad Herwig – jazz trombonist
- Daniel Boyarin – professor of Jewish Studies
- David Gallaher – graphic novelist
- David Helvarg – journalist and environmental activist
- David Mamet – writer, director, Pulitzer prize winner in drama (Glengarry Glen Ross)
- Deborah Tall — poet
- Donald Kofi Tucker – politician
- Ed Allen – American short story writer
- Elaine Terranova – poet
- Ellen Bryant Voigt – MacArthur Genius, former State Poet of Vermont
- Ellen Ratner — White House correspondent
- Ellis Avery – novelist and poet
- Esther Wertheimer – sculptor
- Evalyn Bates – progressive educator, developed the first low-residency American adult degree program
- Frances Olsen – professor of law at UCLA
- Geraldine Clinton Little – poet
- Helen Landgarten – art therapy pioneer
- Howard Ashman – actor, playwright (Little Shop of Horrors), lyricist (The Little Mermaid, Beauty and the Beast)
- J. Ward Carver – Vermont Attorney General, 1925–1931
- Jacqueline Berger — poet
- James Gahagan – abstract artist
- Jane O'Meara Sanders – former president of Burlington College, wife of Senator Bernie Sanders
- Jane Shore – poet
- Jared Carter – poet
- Jared Pappas-Kelley – curator, writer, and artist
- Jay Craven – Vermont film director, screenwriter, and professor
- Jeff McCracken — film and television actor, director, writer, and producer
- Jennifer McMahon — novelist
- Jerri Allyn — performance artist
- John Kasiewicz – guitarist
- Jon Fishman – rock band member (Phish)
- Jonathan Katz – comedian, writer, actor, producer (Dr. Katz)
- Judith Arcana — writer
- Karen Essex — author, journalist, screenwriter
- Kenneth R. Timmerman – correspondent, author, activist
- Kiara Brinkman — author
- Kris Neely – artist and educator
- Larry Feign – cartoonist (The World of Lily Wong)
- Laura McCullough – poet and writer
- Linda McCarriston – poet and professor
- Linnea Johnson – poet
- Lisa Brooks – historian of New England's Native American history
- Lucia Capacchione — art therapist
- Madeline Stone — songwriter
- Mark Doty – poet, National Book Award winner, 2008
- Martin Hyatt — author
- Mary Johnson – author and director of A Room of Her Own Foundation
- Mary Karr – author
- Matthew Quick – American author of young adult and fiction novels
- Mayme Agnew Clayton – librarian, and the founder of the Western States Black Research and Education Center
- Michael Lent – visual artist and curator
- Miriam Hopkins — film and television actor
- Monica Mayer – Mexican artist
- Mumia Abu Jamal – journalist, former Black Panther Party member, convict, author
- Neil Landau – (former faculty) screenwriter, playwright, television producer
- Norman Dubie – poet
- Oliver Foot – British actor, philanthropist, charity worker
- Page McConnell – rock band member (Phish)
- Pamela Stewart – poet
- Paul Zaloom – puppeteer, host of television show Beakman's World
- Peter Hannan – artist, writer, producer (CatDog)
- Philip Zuchman – American painter
- Piers Anthony – English American author
- Rachael Robinson Elmer – painter and illustrator
- Robert Louthan — poet
- Robert M. Fisher – abstract artist
- Ronnie Burrage — jazz percussionist
- Roo Borson —poet
- Russell Potter – Arctic historian, author
- Stephen C. Smith – economist, professor, author
- Sue Owen — poet
- Susan Tichy — poet
- Susie Ibarra – contemporary composer and percussionist
- Suzi Wizowaty – author and politician
- Taina Asili — musician
- Tim Costello (1945–2009), labor and anti-globalization advocate and author
- Tobias Schneebaum – artist, anthropologist, AIDS activist
- Tom Griffin – playwright of The Boys Next Door
- Tommie Smith – athlete, activist, educator, gold medal winner at the 1968 Summer Olympics who set seven individual world records
- Tony Curtis (Welsh poet) (born 1946) – Welsh poet and author
- Trey Anastasio – guitarist, singer, songwriter, member of the band Phish
- Walter F. Scott – (Goddard Seminary) Vermont State Treasurer
- Walter Klenhard — film director, writer and actor
- Walter Mosley – author
- Wayne Karlin – author
- William H. Macy – actor
- William L. White – addiction studies
- William Wildman Campbell — United States House of Representatives
- Yadira Guevara-Prip — stage and television actor.

=== Faculty, staff and administration ===
- Arisa White – faculty advisor in the BFA Creative Writing Program
- Caryn Mirriam-Goldberg – American writer and third Kansas Poet Laureate who founded Goddard's Transformative Language Arts program
- David Mamet – American playwright, essayist, screenwriter, and film director
- Donald Hall — poet and literary critic
- Ellen Bryant Voigt — helped found Goddard's first low-residency program before starting a similar program at Warren Wilson College
- Ernie Stires — composer
- Frank Conroy — author
- Geoffrey Wolff — author
- Hameed Sharif “Herukhuti” Williams – African-American sociologist, cultural studies scholar, sex educator, playwright/poet, and award-winning author
- Heather McHugh — poet
- James Gahagan — sculptor, chairman of Goddard's art department from 1971 to 1979
- Jane O'Meara Sanders – served one year as interim president of Goddard
- John Irving — author
- John Froines – one of the Chicago Seven, taught chemistry in the early 1970s
- Lisel Mueller – poet
- Louise Gluck — Nobel Laureate, poet, winner of the National Book Award and Pulitzer Prize for Poetry
- Marilyn Salzman Webb — activist and journalist who founded Goddard's women's studies program
- Marvin Bell — first Poet Laureate of the State of Iowa
- Michael Ryan — poet
- Murray Bookchin (1921–2006) – American anarchist author, orator, and philosopher
- Peter Schumann and his Bread and Puppet Theater were the theatre-in-residence at Goddard College from 1970 to 1974
- Raymond Carver — author
- Richard Ford — author
- Richard Grossinger — author, publisher - taught interdisciplinary studies (including alchemy, Melville, Classical Greek, Jungian psychology, and ethnoastronomy), 1972-1977
- Robert Hass — poet
- Stephen Dobyns — poet and novelist
- Thomas Yamamoto – art instructor
- Tobias Wolff — author
- Walter Butts – American poet and the Poet Laureate of New Hampshire.

== See also ==
- List of colleges and universities in the United States
