= Sue Owen (poet) =

American poet

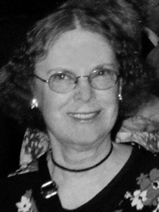
- Born: September 5, 1942 (age 84)
- Citizenship: American
- Occupation: Poet
- Spouse: Thomas Owen

Sue Owen (born September 5, 1942) is a dark humor poet influenced by the work of W. S. Merwin, Charles Simic, and Mark Strand. As the Poet-in-Residence, she taught poetry writing until 2005 at Louisiana State University in Baton Rouge. She now lives in Cambridge, Massachusetts.

== Career ==
Owen grew up Madison, Wisconsin, where she graduated from the University of Wisconsin with a Bachelor of Arts degree in English. Later, at Goddard College, in Vermont, she obtained the Master of Fine Arts degree in Creating Writing. Before joining the faculty at Louisiana State University, she taught a variety of poetry classes in the Baton Rouge community, including as a poet in the schools, at the public library, and at the Council on Aging. In 1988, she won a national competition with the publication of her second book of poetry, and in 1998 she received recognition from the state of Louisiana as the Professional Artist of the Year.

== Poetry awards ==
- Ohio State University Press/The Journal Award for The Book of Winter, 1988
- Artist Fellowship in Poetry from the Louisiana Division of the Arts, 1993
- Governor's Arts Award from the Louisiana State Arts Council, 1998
- Teaching Grants in Poetry from the Louisiana Endowment for the Humanities, 1989-97
- Gretchen Warren Award from the New England Poetry Club, 2013

== Poetry books ==
- Nursery Rhymes for the Dead (Ithaca: Ithaca House, 1980)
- The Book of Winter (Columbus: Ohio State University Press, 1988)
- My Doomsday Sampler (Baton Rouge: Louisiana State University Press, 1999)
- The Devil's Cookbook (Baton Rouge: Louisiana State University Press, 2007)
- Nursery Rhymes for the Dead: Collected Poems, translated by Ilya Lukovtsev (Moscow: Vodoley Press, 2018)
- Hurricane in a Bad Mood (Lafayette: University of Louisiana at Lafayette, 2024)

== Selected anthologies ==
- The Best of Intro (Norfolk: Associated Writing Programs, 1985)
- Shared Sightings: An Anthology of Bird Poems (Santa Barbara: John Daniel & Co., 1995)
- Uncommonplace: An Anthology of Contemporary Louisiana Poets (Baton Rouge: Louisiana State University Press, 1998)
- Verse and Universe: Poems about Mathematics and Science (Minneapolis: Milkweed Editions, 1998)
- The Poetry Anthology, 1912-2002 (Chicago: Ivan R. Dee, 2002)

== International publications ==
- Bonniers Litterära Magasin (BLM), Stockholm, Sweden, vol. 52, no. 6 (December, 1983): "Poem" and "The Fear"
- Horisont, Helsinki, Finland, vol. 30, no. 2 (March, 1983): "Journey," "The Book of Winter," "Cellar," and "The Obscure"
- USA Poetry (Gothenburg, Sweden: Café Existens, 1984): "Lullaby," "The Spell," and "Fire"
- British Broadcasting Corporation (BBC-3) Archive, London, United Kingdom, "Words and Music: Apples," July 10, 2011: "The Poisoned Apple"
- Arion, Moscow, Russia, vol. 23, no. 2 (June, 2016): "Zero," "Old Potato Eyes," "Question," "Poem," "One Foot in the Grave," and "This is the Sparrow"
