= Institute for Social Ecology =

Educational institution in Vermont, US

The Institute for Social Ecology (ISE) is an educational institution in Plainfield, Vermont, dedicated to the study of social ecology, "an interdisciplinary field drawing on philosophy, political and social theory, anthropology, history, economics, the natural sciences, and feminism." Founded in 1974, ISE offered some of the first courses in the country on urbanism and ecology, radical technology, ecology and feminism, activist art and community; it "won an international reputation" for its courses in social theory, eco-philosophy and alternative technologies.

== History ==
The Institute for Social Ecology was established at Goddard College in Plainfield, Vermont, in 1974 by cultural anthropologist Daniel Chodorkoff and author Murray Bookchin. The ISE became independent from Goddard in 1981, establishing its own campus at Cate farm in Plainfield.

In 1974, Dan Chodorkoff arranged for 20 members of the Lower East Side activist group Charas to visit the Institute; they were doing similar work in their neighborhoord, including the creation of a community garden, building a geodesic dome, and the rehabilitation of abandoned buildings into housing and an arts center. The group included future actor Luis Guzman, who recalled, "I discovered a new sense of freedom when I came up here. The fresh air, the vibe, growing your own food, solar energy. These guys were doing all that type of stuff. I was going to the quarry and swimming and everybody was butt naked. Oh, hell, yeah!"

In 1986, members of the Maple Hill neighborhood in Rochester, Vermont, hired a lawyer to challenge state and local building permits for the Institute, based on a variety of concerns that included water pollution, traffic congestion, and the subject matter taught at the school. In 2014, after forty years of operation, Dan Chodorkoff reflected on the founding in 1974, "People thought we were kind of crazy back then but the ideas have percolated into the larger society and I think that's particularly true in Vermont: ideas around de-centralization and ecological forms of food production."

While the three-month summer programs had hosted an estimated 300 participants, the Institute has since become smaller, but continues to offer smaller programs.

The Institute for Social Ecology has been involved in the exploration of ecological approaches to food production, alternative technologies, and urban design. It has been involved with the anti-nuclear movement of the 1970s, and affiliated with the Occupy movement and climate movement. Over time, the ISE developed what The Guardian described as an "international reputation for its courses in social theory, eco-philosophy and alternative technologies."

== Activities ==
The ISE hosts summer programs, a year-round B.A. degree program, workshops on issues such as biotechnology and a speakers bureau. The ISE is involved in research as well as publishing and activist projects.

=== Intensives ===
The ISE organizes educational 'intensive seminars' about human/nature relationships, directly democratic movements, climate change, and the historical unfolding of Left politics. At ISE intensives, students establish links between their current political work on the ground to the 'grounded theory' of social ecology.

=== MA Program at Prescott College ===
The ISE works in collaboration with the Prescott College Master of Arts Program (MAP) to offer a concentration in social ecology for Prescott MAP students. Students attend colloquia in Prescott, Arizona, and in Vermont, while working independently in their home communities in collaboration with an ISE graduate advisor.

=== Summer colloquia ===
The Institute for Social Ecology has held annual summer colloquia since 2007. The weekend gatherings are an opportunity for new and longtime associates of the Institute to discuss current issues, workshop writing projects, and renew a sense of community.

=== Activism ===
Dan Chordokoff told VPR in 2014, "I think we've always seen our role as one of educating other educators and activists," and "as a place which was involved in praxis, really trying to take the ideas and see how they can be applied in the world. And invariably, inevitably that's led to involvement in a number of ecologically oriented social movements over the years."

In the early 2000s, the ISE Biotechnology Project activist focus included opposition to genetic engineering of food. ISE has also been involved in the movement for climate justice, including protests that occurred on the day after Earth Day in 1990. The ISE's approach to grassroots organizing is rooted in the principles of decentralism, community control, and face-to-face, direct democracy that have broadly inspired many movements for global justice.

== See also ==
- Sustainability
- Biodiversity
- Food sovereignty
- Social justice
