= Royce S. Pitkin =

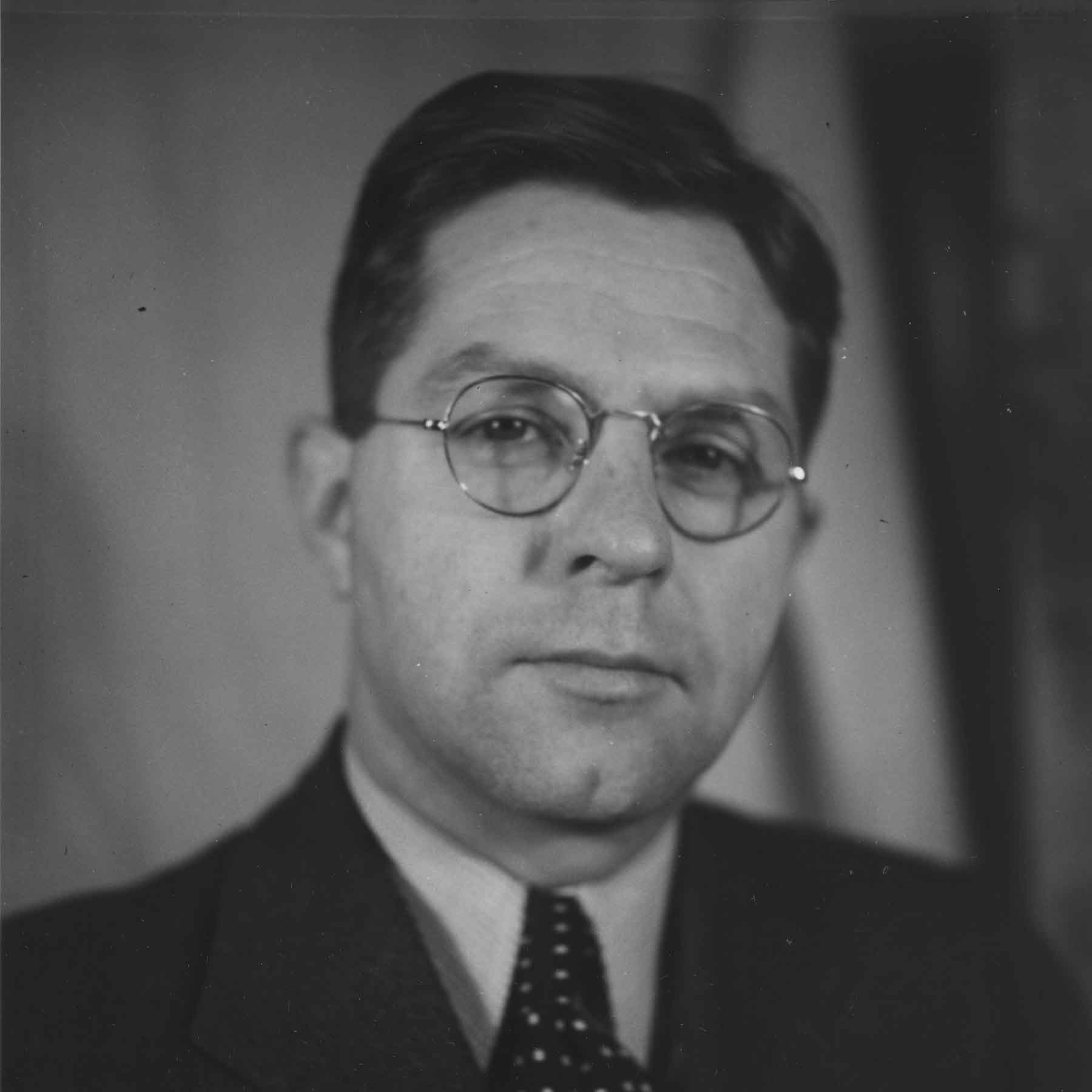
- Born: June 7, 1901; Marshfield, Vermont
- Died: May 3, 1986 (aged 84); Medical Center Hospital, Burlington, Vermont
- Education: Goddard Seminary; BS, University of Vermont, 1923; MA, Columbia University Teachers College, 1928; PhD, Columbia University Teachers College, 1933
- Occupation: Educator
- Known for: President of Goddard College, 1938–1969
- Spouse: Helen Kathleen McKelvey
- Children: 3

Royce Stanley “Tim” Pitkin (June 7, 1901– May 3, 1986) was an American educator. He was President of Goddard College from 1938 to 1969.

== Biography ==
=== Early life and education ===
Royce Pitkin received his early education in the Marshfield public schools and at Goddard Seminary in Barre, Vermont. In 1923 he was awarded the Bachelor of Science degree from the University of Vermont where he majored in agriculture. He received the M.A. and Ph.D. from the Columbia University Teachers College in 1928 and 1933.

=== Goddard ===
Pitkin held a number of teaching positions and headmasterships at various places in New England before being invited to become the Director of Goddard Junior College (an outgrowth of the earlier Seminary) in 1935. In 1936 Pitkin became the President of Goddard Seminary and Junior College.

The Seminary was struggling to compete with public schools and on the verge of closing. In the fall of 1936, under Pitkin's leadership, the Seminary faculty began a careful and prolonged study of the requirements of modern education in an attempt to determine what changes were needed in their own educational program. From these studies it became evident to the trustees and faculty that in order for Goddard to survive, an entirely new institution would need to be created. As a result, a conference was held in New York City under the chairmanship of Dr. William Heard Kilpatrick to design a radically different approach to education for this new college.

On March 13, 1938, the Goddard College Charter was recorded with the Secretary of State's Office in Montpelier, Vermont. The campus was moved from Barre to Greatwood Farm in Plainfield, Vermont, that year and Pitkin remained as president of the college until his retirement in 1969.

During his tenure at Goddard, “Tim,” as he was almost universally known, had an immense influence on the development of American education. At Columbia University’s Teachers College Pitkin had studied with Dr. William Heard Kilpatrick, who followed John Dewey’s progressive education philosophy. So Pitkin adopted a Deweyan model for Goddard, seeking to mend the rift between daily life and learning.

The aims of the college, as stated in the first catalog in 1938, included the education of men and women for real living through the actual facing of real life problems. The Goddard College philosophy established by Pitkin was initially founded on four principles:

- Thought should be tested by action
- We only learn what we can inwardly accept
- One matures by carrying responsibilities suited to one’s capacities
- College should provide educational opportunities for adults because learning should continue throughout life.

In his quest to get to the root of education Pitkin and his colleagues at Goddard did away with the grading system, written examinations, required courses, credits, fraternities, athletics, honor rolls, and diplomas. Pitkin created an institution in which the students had a great deal of responsibility for maintaining the campus and for developing policies that directly affected their lives through community government and a daily work program. The result was the establishment of an experimental and innovative educational institution that made significant contributions to higher education.

=== Associations ===
In addition to his work at Goddard College, Pitkin had a number of other important associations. During World War II, he was a public panel member of the War Labor Board and later served as an arbitrator in labor-management disputes. He was President of the Vermont and Quebec Universalist-Unitarian Convention; Chairman of the section on residential Adult Education of the Adult Education Association; President of Vermont Foundation of Independent Colleges; Chairman, Board of Directors of the Vermont Labor and Farm Council; Member of the Board of Directors for the Advancement of Small Colleges; Chairman of the Committee on Research and Development of the Council for the Advancement of Small Colleges; Chairman of the Board of Directors of the Union for Research and Experimentation in Higher Education.

Pitkin also received honorary degrees from Goddard College, Nasson College, Hartwick College, Windham College, and the University of Vermont.

=== Writing ===
Pitkin wrote on various aspects of education and conservation in The Saturday Review, Parents Magazine, The Nation’s Schools, The NEA Journal, and The New York Times. He also wrote a children’s book entitled Maple Sugar Time.

== Personal life ==
Pitkin married Helen Kathleen McKelvey in 1924. They had three children.

Following his retirement from the presidency of Goddard College, Pitkin continued a very active life as a consultant, advisor, and trustee to many educational institutions. He died on May 3, 1986, at the age of 84.
