= Alan Wood =

Alan Wood may refer to:

- Alan Wood (Australian politician) (1927–2005), Victorian state politician
- Alan Wood (author) (1914–1957), Australian and British journalist and author
- Alan Wood (engineer) (born 1947), British engineer and executive
- Allen Wood (footballer) (1941–2018), sometimes listed as Alan, Welsh football player
- Alan Wood (footballer, born 1900) (1900–?), English footballer
- Alan Wood (footballer, born 1954), English football player
- Alan Wood (military officer) (1922–2013), American naval officer
- Alan Wood Jr. (1834–1902), U.S. Representative from Pennsylvania
- Alan Muir Wood (1921–2009), British civil engineer
- Alan Thorpe Richard Wood (born 1954), British public servant

== See also ==
- Allan Singleton-Wood (born 1933), British musician and publisher who performed under the stage name Allan Wood
- Allan Wood (1943–2022), Australian swimmer
- Allen Wood (disambiguation)
- Al Wood (born 1958), American basketball player
- Alan Woods (disambiguation)
