= 2026 United States Air Force Boeing B-52 crash =

2026 military aviation accident in Edwards, California

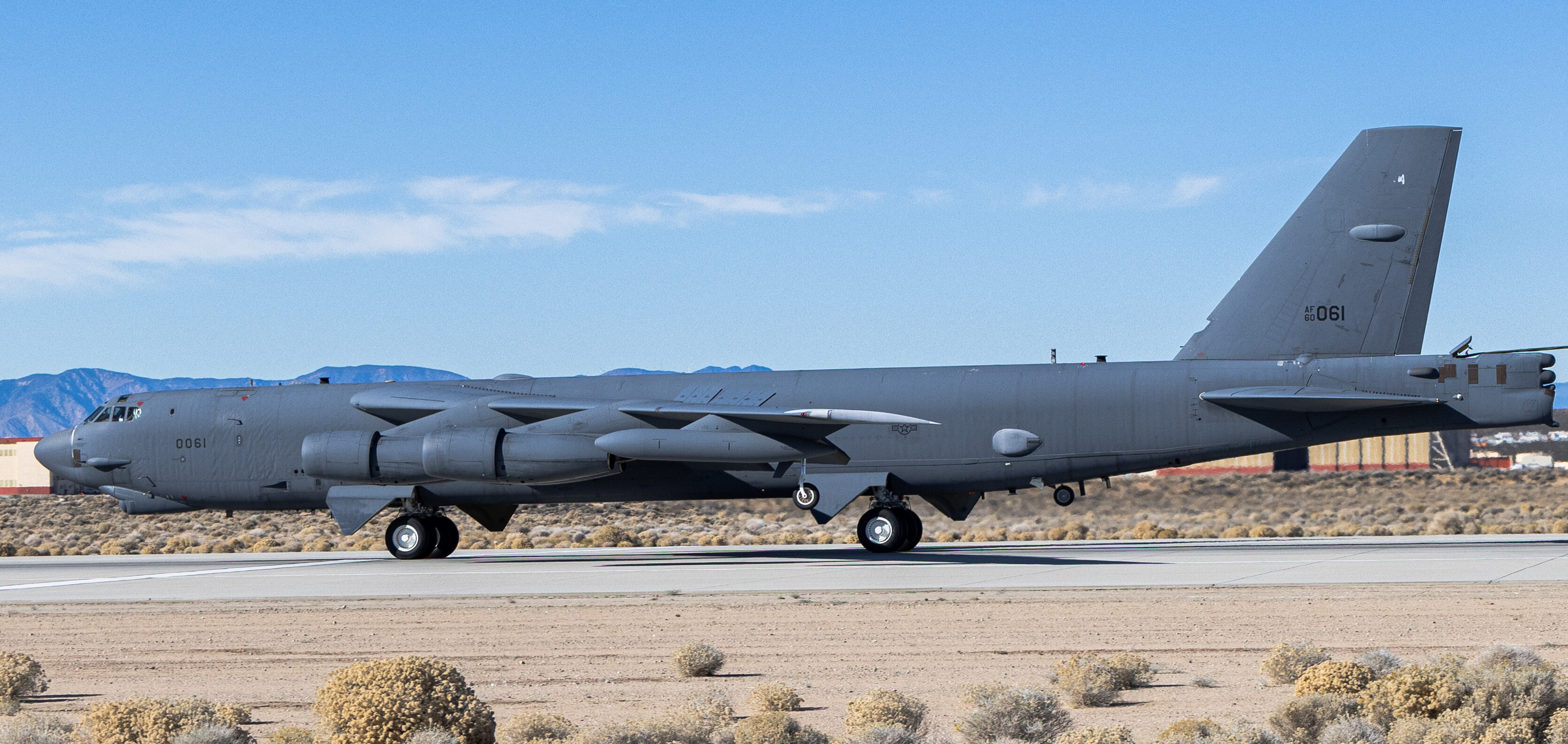
- 60-0061, the aircraft involved in the accident, pictured in 2025

Accident
- Date: June 15, 2026
- Summary: Crashed shortly after takeoff; under investigation
- Site: Edwards Air Force Base, Edwards, California, United States

Aircraft
- Aircraft type: Boeing B-52H Stratofortress
- Operator: United States Air Force
- Call sign: TORCH 11
- Registration: 60-0061
- Flight origin: Edwards Air Force Base, Edwards, California, United States
- Occupants: 8
- Crew: 8
- Fatalities: 8
- Survivors: 0

On June 15, 2026, a United States Air Force (USAF) Boeing B-52 Stratofortress strategic bomber crashed shortly after takeoff near Edwards Air Force Base in Edwards, California, United States. All eight crew members were killed.

The accident was the first crash of a B-52 since 2016, when one crashed at Andersen Air Force Base in Guam, injuring the seven crew members. It is also the deadliest crash of a B-52 since 1982, when one crashed at Mather Air Force Base in Sacramento County, California, killing all eight crew members.

== Background ==
=== Aircraft ===
The aircraft involved in the accident was 60-0061, a Boeing B-52H Stratofortress operated by the United States Air Force, and assigned to the 412th Test Wing. 60-0061 was operated by the 307th Bomb Wing in the mid-2010s, where it was nicknamed The Spirit of Aggieland II. In December 2025, Edwards Air Force Base said the aircraft had flown from Port San Antonio to the base after receiving an upgraded radar system as part of an ongoing modernization program.

=== Passengers and crew ===
The aircraft was carrying eight people, including military personnel, civilians and contractors, on a routine test mission. Boeing confirmed that two of its employees were among the occupants. The flight was intended to support an active electronically scanned array (AESA) radar modernization program.

== Accident ==
The crash generated a large plume of smoke visible on satellite imagery (CIRA image pictured)

The crash was reported at 11:20 a.m. PDT. Photos from the scene showed little recognizable wreckage after a post-crash fire, and video footage showed a large plume of black smoke rising from the crash site.

== Aftermath ==
Shortly before 1:00 p.m., the base announced that the airfield was closed and all inbound aircraft were being diverted. All non-commercial visitor passes for the base were suspended in order to minimize interference with the emergency response. The crash was later deemed "not survivable", and Air Force Materiel Command Commander Lieutenant general Linda Hurry confirmed the death of all 8 personnel on board the aircraft. In a separate statement, Chief of Staff of the Air Force General Kenneth S. Wilsbach expressed his sorrows and thoughts with the bomber and testing community, saying that he is "keeping the families, friends, and loved ones affected in my prayers."

== Investigation ==
The cause of the crash was not immediately known. Colonel James Hayes, Deputy Commander of the 412th Test Wing, said the investigation could take an estimated six months.

== See also ==
- List of accidents and incidents involving the Boeing B-52 Stratofortress
