= James Gahagan =

American painter

- Born: 1927; Brooklyn, New York City
- Died: July 7, 1999; Woodbury, Vermont
- Occupation: Artist
- Spouse: Pat deGogorza
- Website: http://www.jamesgahagan.com/

James Gahagan (1927 – July 7, 1999) was an American abstract expressionist painter and one of the premier American colorists. He was an Associate Director of the Hans Hofmann School and created, with Hoffman, two major mosaic murals in New York City.

== Biography ==
Gahagan was born in Brooklyn, New York. The son of a labour union organiser, he served in the United States Navy during the Second World War and then attended Goddard College, Plainfield, Vermont from 1947 to 1951 with American sculptor Richard Lippold, and fellow abstract artist Robert M. Fisher. He then moved to New York City, and became involved in projects with abstract artist Hans Hofmann. In the 1950s when co-founded the James Gallery in 1954, and organising the Artist Tenants Association, as well as being its first president.

Gahagan's work was being exhibited in New York, Provincetown, San Francisco, Los Angeles and Paris. In America specifically it is found in the Metropolitan Museum of Art, the Chrysler Museum in Norfolk, Virginia, and the University of California Art Museum in Berkeley. It was also featured in a 1957 travelling exhibition to 64 nations funded by the United Nations, and chosen by Art News for a 1959 exhibit of twelve Americans in Spoleto, Italy, at the same time he was awarded a Longview Purchase Grant.

In 1962, Gahagan was one leader of an artists strike which succeeded in gaining zoning for artists' lofts in New York City, such as Westbeth, and co-founding the Artists Tenant Association. Gahagan taught art at a number of universities in America from 1965 onwards, including the Pratt Institute, Columbia University Graduate School of the Arts and Goddard College as Chairman of the Art Department.

The James Gahagan School of Fine Arts was opened from 1971–1974 in Woodbury, Vermont, and Gahagan was a guest teacher at Notre Dame University, Indiana, in 1978, Humboldt State University, California, in 1989, and the Vermont Studio Center from 1984 until 1999. He had also become a critic at the International Art Workshop in New Zealand between 1991 and 1992. He died at his home in Woodbury, Vermont.
