= List of accidents and incidents involving the Boeing B-52 Stratofortress =

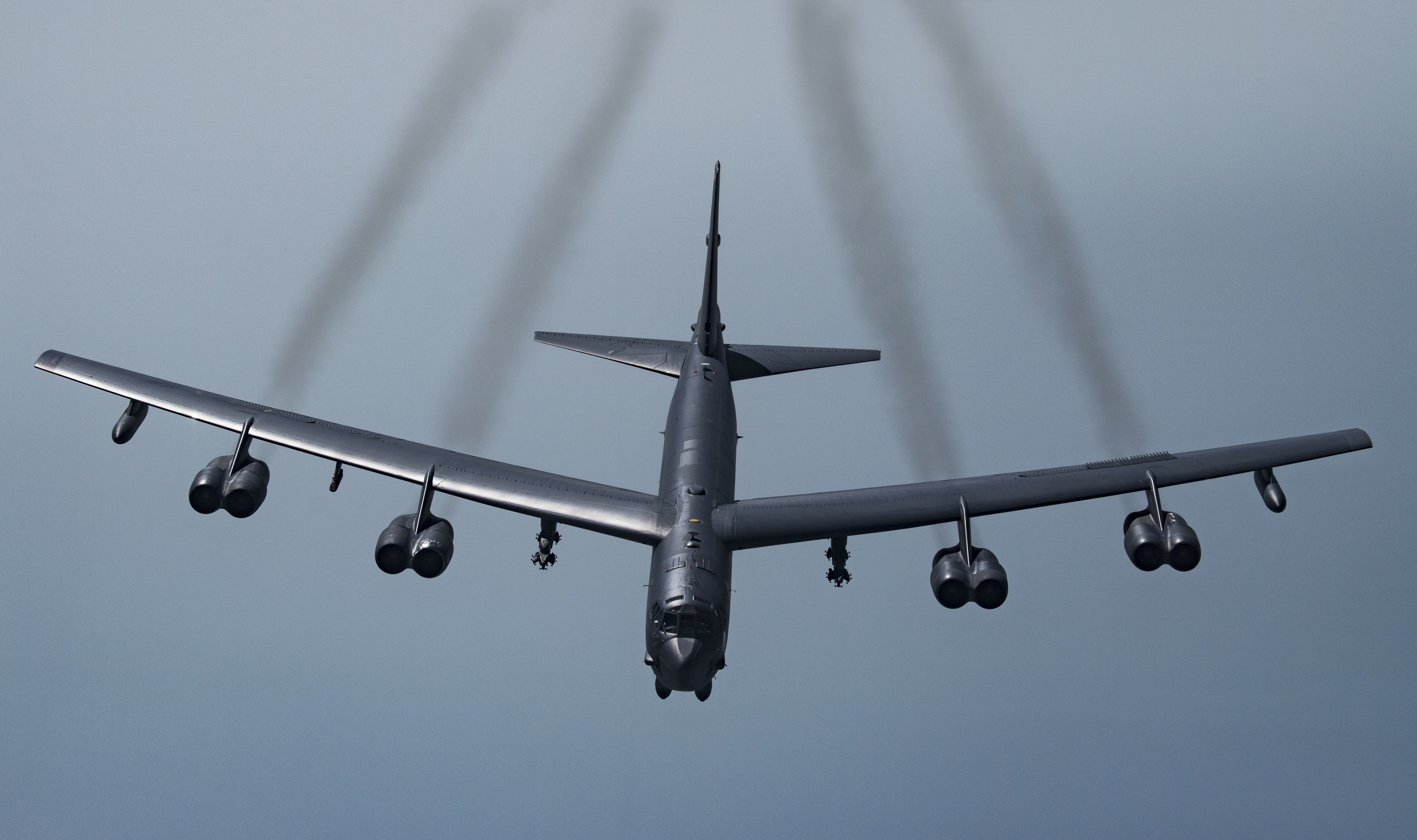
A Boeing B-52H Stratofortress in flight.

The Boeing B-52 Stratofortress has been operational with the United States Air Force since 5 June 1955. This list is of accidents and incidents involving the B-52 resulting in loss of life, severe injuries, or a loss of an aircraft (damaged beyond repair). Incidents in which the aircraft was damaged but repaired are not included.

== 1950–1959 ==
=== 1956 ===
On 16 February, after an inflight fire on the right wing, a B-52B (tail number 53–0384) from the 93rd Bombardment Wing (Heavy) out of Castle Air Force Base (AFB), Merced County, California, crashed on a functional flight test near Tracy, California. Four crew members including the deputy wing commander Patrick D. Fleming died while four others survived.^{[c]}

After an inflight fire, on 16 September, a "B" model (tail number 53-0393) of the 93rd Bombardment Wing, Castle AFB, crashed nine miles (14 km) southeast of Madera, California. The pilot and copilot ejected safely, but the remaining five crew members died. No cause is listed.^{[c]}

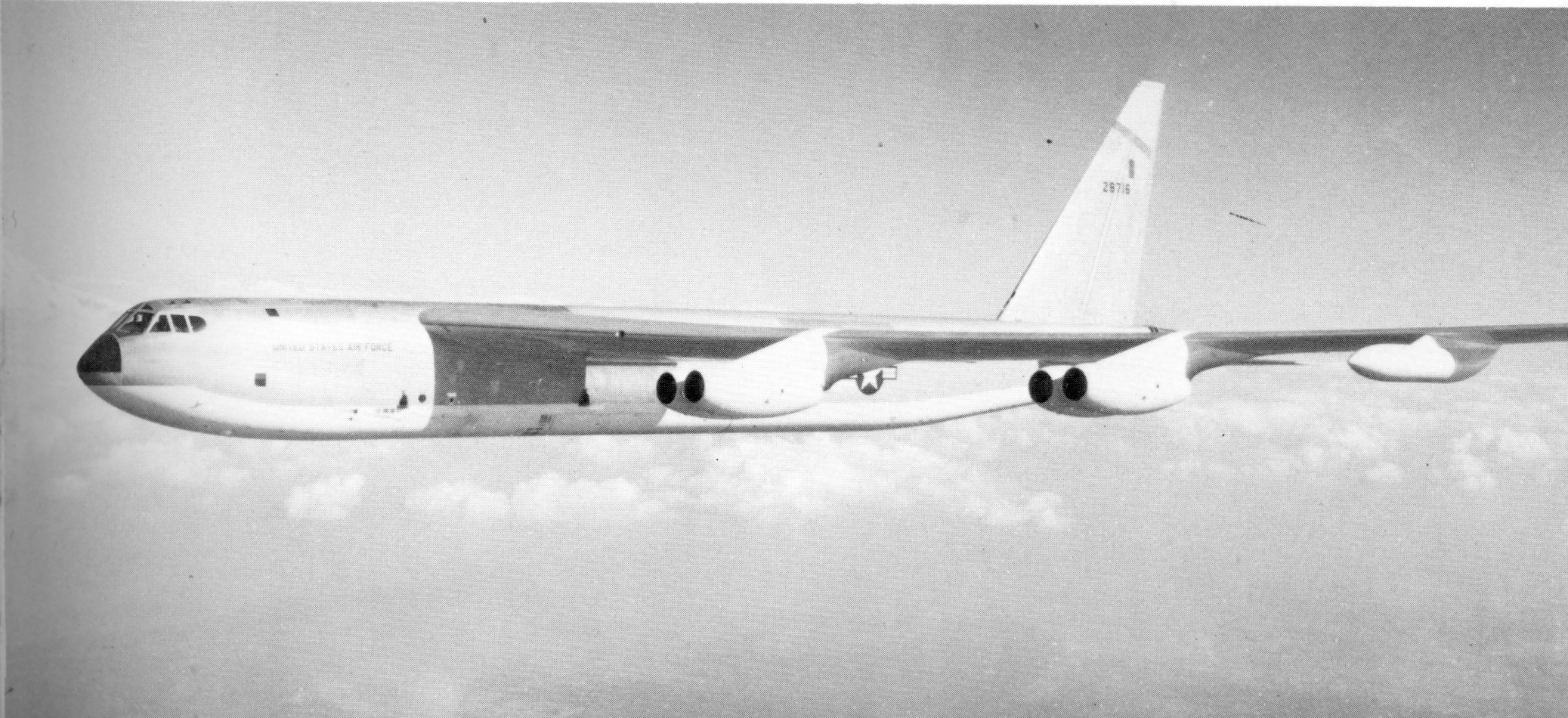
B-52B (tail number 52-8716) flying

On 30 November, a RB-52B (tail number 52-8716) from the 93rd Bombardment Wing, Castle AFB, crashed 4 miles (6.4 km) north of the base during takeoff on a training flight. Six crew members plus four instructors died.^{[b]} On a night mission, while climbing to 500 feet (150 m), the aircraft dropped to a 5° nose down attitude. During the investigation, no technical issues or structural failures were found. It is believed the accident was caused by either by a wrong maneuver by the pilot or because the crew was distracted. Following the accident, the Air Force recommended that flaps could not be raised below a minimum of 1,000 feet (300 m). This is the worst single aircraft loss of life accident in the B-52s operating history. This was also the third B-52 crash at Castle AFB in eight months.

=== 1957 ===
From a routine instrument training mission on 10 January, a B-52D (tail number 55‑0082) of the 42nd Bombardment Wing (Heavy) returning to Loring AFB, Maine, broke apart in midair and crashed near Morrell, New Brunswick, Canada, about ten miles (16 km) southeast of the base. The crash killed eight of the nine crew on board; the co-pilot, Captain Joseph L. Church, parachuted to safety. The crash was believed to have been caused by overstressing the wings and/or airframe during an exercise designed to test the pilot's reflexes. This was the fourth crash involving a B-52 in eleven months.^{[e]}

On 29 March, a B-52C (tail number 54-2676) retained by Boeing and used for tests as JB-52C, crashed during a test flight by Boeing from Wichita, Kansas. Two of the four crew on board died.^{[d]} The aircraft crashed near Skiatook, Oklahoma, about 15 miles (24 km) northwest of Tulsa, Oklahoma. The investigation found the airplane experienced a loss of AC electrical power during negative G-force conditions due to a defective constant speed drive.

On 6 November, a B-52B (tail number 53-0382) from the 93rd Bombardment Wing crashed and was damaged beyond repair upon landing at Castle AFB. The aircraft was performing touch and go landings and the latch on the landing gear lever failed resulting in the landing gear retracting while the airplane was still on the runway. There were no fatalities, but several crew members were severely injured.^{[m]}

On 12 December, the incorrect wiring of a stabilizer trim switch caused a B-52D (tail number 56‑0597) from the 92d Bombardment Wing (Heavy) to crash at Fairchild AFB, Washington state. The incorrect stabilizer trim caused a loss of control resulting in the aircraft crashing at the end of the runway. The tail gunner, Gene I. Graye, survived but the other eight crew on board died.^{[f]}

=== 1958 ===
Due to total loss of power during final approach, on 11 February, a B-52D (tail number 56-0610) crashed short of the runway at Ellsworth AFB, South Dakota. The aircraft was from the 77th Bombardment Squadron (Heavy) of the 28th Bombardment Wing (Heavy) based at Ellsworth AFB, South Dakota.^{[m]} Two of the eight crew members on board died in addition to three ground personnel. The crash was determined to be from frozen fuel lines that clogged fuel filters. The fact that jet fuel absorbs water vapor from the atmosphere was not known before this accident. After this accident, over two hundred previous aircraft losses listed as "cheese" were attributed to frozen fuel lines.^{[f]}

On 26 June, a "D" model (tail number 55‑0102) operated by the 42nd Bombardment Wing was destroyed by a ground fire at Loring AFB. There were no injuries.^{[e]}^{[m]} A fuel leak ignited while the aircraft was parked and being serviced; the crew chief attempted to start the engines without "pulling the circuit breaker" first, leading to a spark, which ignited the fuel.

On 29 July, another "D" model (tail number 55-0093) from 42nd Bombardment Wing flew into the ground in extreme weather and crashed in a field near Loring AFB. Eight of the crew of nine died.^{[e]}

Two B-52Ds (tail number 56‑0661 and 56‑0681) from the 92d Bombardment Wing collided on 8 September in midair near Fairchild AFB. Thirteen crew members on the two aircraft died.^{[f]} The planes' crews were conducting flight training consisting of visual and instrument approaches and landings. The control tower operator noticed the two aircraft in dangerous proximity and ordered them to perform separation maneuvers as per standard protocol; the close aircraft was instructed to descend and turn left and land while the farther aircraft was instructed to breakaway (climb and to the right). Instead, both aircraft climbed and turned right. A few seconds later, at an altitude of 900 feet (270 m), both aircraft collided and crashed about three miles (4.8 km) from the runway. The collision was the result of the approach procedures not being followed by the crew; although, investigators were unable to determine why the crew failed to follow the standard procedures and Air Traffic Control instructions. Three crew members survived with serious injuries.

On 17 September, another "D" model (tail number 55‑0065) from 42nd Bombardment Wing, Loring AFB crashed 10 miles (16 km) south of Saint Paul, Minnesota. A flight control failure led to the separation of the tail. Only one of the eight crew members survived. In addition, several local civilians were injured. The aircraft was attached to the 42nd Bombardment Wing at Loring AFB.^{[e]}^{[m]}

On 9 December, B-52E (tail number 56‑0633) from the 11th Bombardment Wing was on a routine night training mission when it crashed at Altus AFB, Oklahoma. Improper use of the stabilizer trim during an overshoot was the cause of the crash. All nine on board died.^{[e]}^{[m]}

=== 1959 ===
On 29 January, B-52B (53‑0371) from the 93rd Bombardment Wing crashed during takeoff at Castle AFB. The crew managed to evacuate the aircraft safely.^{[c]} The crew aborted the take-off at a high speed forcing the airplane back onto the runway and then it skidded off the end of the runway. The aircraft was damaged beyond repair.

On 23 June, B-52D (tail number 56‑0591, call sign "Tommy's Tigator") operating out of Larson AFB, crashed in the Ochoco National Forest near Burns, Oregon. The aircraft was operated by Boeing personnel during a test flight and crashed after turbulence-induced failure in the horizontal stabilizer at a low elevation. All five Boeing personnel died.^{[f]}

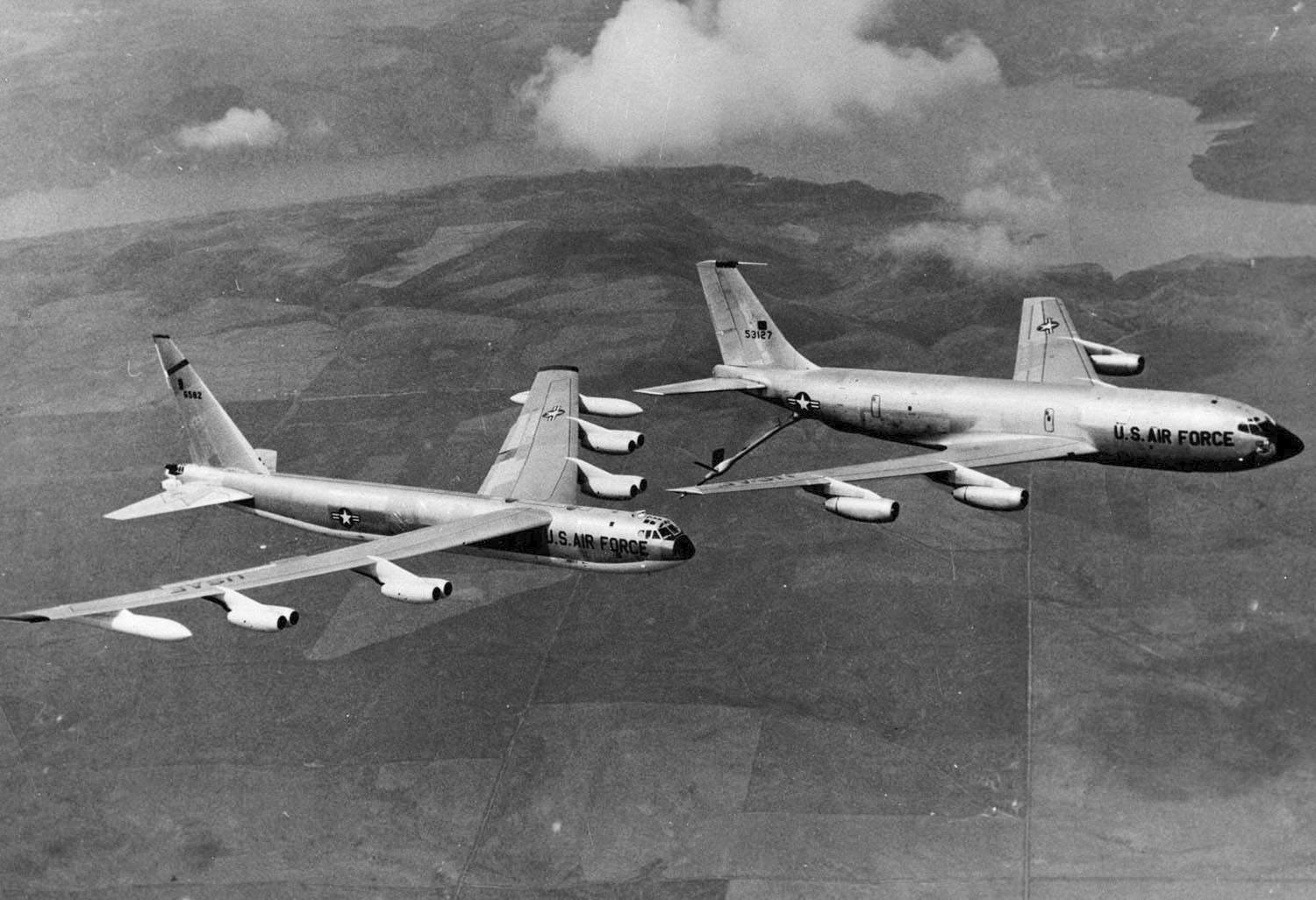
A Boeing B-52D (SN 56–0582) being refueled by a Boeing KC-135A (SN 55–3127).

On 10 August, a B-52C (tail number 54-2682) from the 99th Bombardment Wing (Heavy) crashed 20 miles (32 km) northeast of New Hampton, New Hampshire, after the nose radome failed in flight. The crew ejected safely.^{[d]} While on a training mission, the crew encountered problems after the radome detached in flight. The captain elected to divert to the nearest airport but due to poor weather conditions, ATC vectored the crew to RCAF Goose Bay Station, Labrador, Canada, about 860 miles (1,380 km) northeast of his position. As they believed they could not make it, the crew decided to bail out and abandoned the aircraft. It flew into the ground and crashed in a Spruce swamp located near Fremont, New Hampshire. The aircraft disintegrated on impact and all eight crew members were later found uninjured.

During a mid-air refueling on 15 October, a B-52F (tail number 57‑0036) from the 4228th Strategic Wing at Columbus AFB, Mississippi, carrying two nuclear weapons collided with a KC-135 tanker (tail number 57-1513) at 32,000 feet (9,800 m) over Hardinsburg, Kentucky. Four of the eight crew members on the bomber and all four crew on the tanker were killed. One of the nuclear bombs was damaged by fire, but both weapons were recovered.^{[g]}

== 1960–1969 ==
=== 1960 ===
On 1 February, B-52G (tail number 58‑0180) from the 72nd Bombardment Wing (Heavy) crashed at Ramey AFB, near Aguadilla, Puerto Rico. An incorrect trim setting during touch-and-go approach was determined to be the cause of the crash. All seven of the crew died including the vice-commander of the 72nd Bombardment Wing.^{[h]}

On 1 April, B-52D (tail number 56‑0607) of the 92nd Bombardment Wing burned out on the runway at Fairchild AFB, due to the failure of wings. All nine crew were successfully evacuated from the aircraft.^{[f]} The crew was participating in a Minimum Interval Take Off mission. The aircraft was cleared for take-off, when the brakes were released, an explosion was heard on the left side of the aircraft, followed by the airplane settling to the right. The left wing had fallen off at the root joining the fuselage. The tail-gunner sustained fractures to both elbows egressing to the ground.

On 9 December, a "D" model (tail number 55‑0114) from the 99th Bombardment Wing from Westover AFB crashed near Barre, Vermont. The crash came after the navigator ejected without notifying the pilot after the aircraft descended to a low altitude route. The pilot, hearing the vibration and noise from the ejection, concluded that the aircraft was breaking up and ordered the rest of the crew to eject. The gunner was killed after ejecting.^{[e]} The aircraft continued to fly in an erratic manner until it crashed in Plainfield, Vermont, 50 miles (80 km) from where the crew ejected. All but one of the crew survived with injuries and frostbite from the cold and snow in the area. The body of the tail gunner was found on July 4, 1961, seven months later.

Six days later, on 15 December, another "D" model (tail number 55‑0098) from the 327th Bombardment Squadron, 4170th Strategic Wing collided with a KC-135 from the 22nd Air Refueling Squadron, 92nd Bombardment Wing during mid-air refueling over Mullan Pass, Idaho. The refueling probe from the KC-135 pierced the skin on the wing of the B-52. Upon landing at Larson AFB, the starboard wing failed, and the aircraft caught fire during the landing roll. The runway at Larson was damaged. All crew members were evacuated. The KC-135 landed at Fairchild AFB.^{[e]}

=== 1961 ===
On 19 January, B-52B (53‑0390, call sign "Felon 22") from the 334th Bombardment Squadron, 95th Bombardment Wing out of Biggs AFB, El Paso, Texas crashed just north of Monticello, Utah after a turbulence-induced structural failure. The tail snapped off, at 36,000 feet (11,000 m). Only the copilot survived after ejecting. The other seven crew members died.^{[c]}

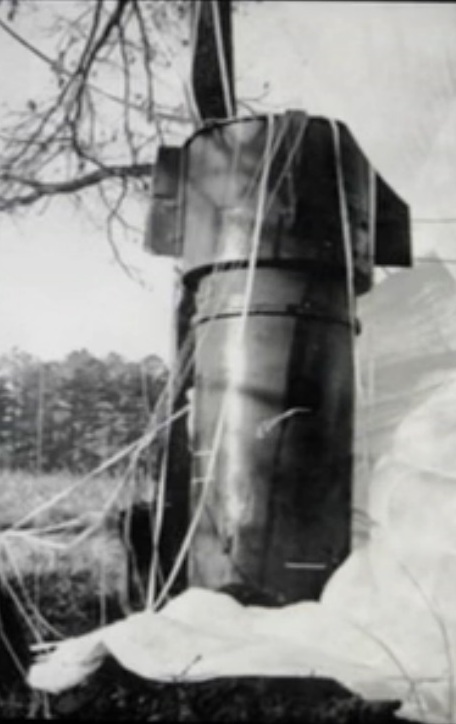
One of the two MK 39 nuclear bombs involved in the 1961 Goldsboro crash after soft landing with parachute deployed.

A "Broken Arrow" incident: On 24 January 1961, B-52G (tail number 58‑0187) from the 4241st Strategic Wing broke up in midair and crashed on approach to Seymour Johnson AFB near Goldsboro, North Carolina, dropping two nuclear bombs in the process without detonation. The aircraft suffered a fuel leak at altitude due to fatigue failure of the starboard wing. A loss of control resulted when, as the flaps were applied, the wing failed during the emergency approach to Seymour Johnson AFB. Three of the eight crew members died.^{[h]} The weapons came down at Faro, North Carolina, 12 miles (19 km) north of Goldsboro, North Carolina. One fell by parachute and was caught in the branches of a tree. The other bomb crashed into the ground at high velocity and buried itself deeply. The Air Force was unable to recover parts of the bomb buried below 40 feet (12 m) due to flooding in the hole so much of it was left in place. Today, The USAF still owns a 200-foot (61 m) circle of ground at the site and regularly tests for radiation. It was found that three of the four firing safeties had released on both bombs indicating just one safety stopped nuclear detonation. On 2 July 2012, North Carolina erected a historical road marker in the town of Eureka, three miles (4.8 km) north of the crash site, commemorating the crash under the title "Nuclear Mishap.", The unveiling ceremony was attended by Adam Mattocks, the sole survivor (at the time) of the crew of 58–0187.

Another "Broken Arrow" incident: On 14 March 1961, B-52F (tail number 57‑0166) of the 4134th Strategic Wing operating out of Mather AFB, California, carrying two nuclear weapons experienced an uncontrolled decompression, necessitating a descent to 10,000 feet (3,000 m) to lower the cabin altitude. Due to increased fuel consumption at the lower altitude and being unable to rendezvous with a tanker in time, the aircraft ran out of fuel. The crew ejected safely, while the now-unmanned bomber crashed 15 miles (24 km) west of Yuba City, California.^{[g]} The high explosives on the bomb did not detonate, preventing a nuclear detonation.

On 30 March, B-52G (tail number 59‑2576, call sign "Judy 24") of the 4038th Strategic Wing crashed near Lexington, North Carolina after losing control during an aerial refueling attempt. The crew was ordered to bail out but out of the eight crew on board, only six had ejector seats and just two of the five crew members who ejected survived. An explosion occurred when the bomber crashed into the ground. The reason for loss of control is unknown. The aircraft had flown only 233 hours when the accident occurred.^{[i]}

On 7 April, B-52B (53‑0380, named "Ciudad Juarez") from the 95th Bombardment Wing out of Biggs AFB was accidentally shot down by the launch of a AIM-9 Sidewinder from a F-100A Super Sabre (tail number 53-1662) from the 188th Tactical Fighter Squadron, New Mexico Air National Guard fighter jet during a practice intercept. The missile struck the engine pylon on the B-52 resulting in separation of the wing. The aircraft crashed on Mount Taylor, New Mexico with three of the eight crew on board killed. An electrical fault in the firing circuit caused the inadvertent launch of the missile.^{[c]}

On 15 October, B-52G (tail number 58‑0196, call sign "Pogo 22") from the 4241st Strategic Wing out of Seymour Johnson AFB disappeared off the coast of Newfoundland over the Atlantic Ocean. The aircraft was participating in exercise "Sky Shield II" as part of a mock attack force. The crew of eight is listed as lost, presumed dead.^{[h]}

=== 1962 ===
On 23 February, a B-52 of the 346th Bombardment Squadron of the 99th Bombardment Wing from Westover AFB lost a crewman when a hatch malfunctioned and opened at altitude. The aircraft commander was killed when the rapid decompression sucked him out of the hatch without a parachute. The aircraft was flying an Operation Chrome Dome mission and was near Thule AB at the time.^{[m]}

=== 1963 ===
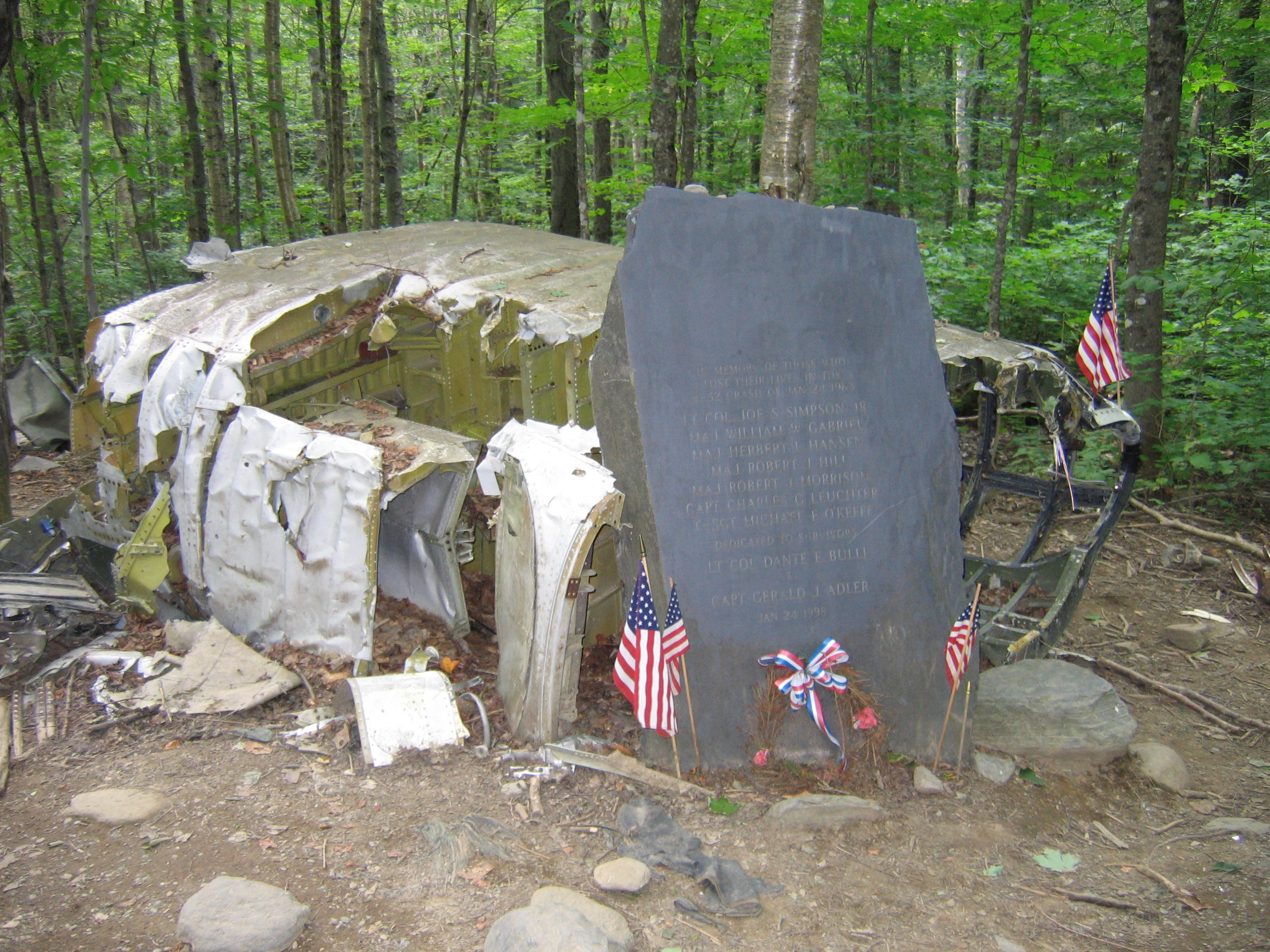
Memorial on Elephant Mountain.

On 24 January, a B-52C (tail number 53‑0406) on a training mission out of Westover AFB, lost its vertical stabilizer due to buffeting during low-level flight, and crashed on the west side of Elephant Mountain near Greenville, Maine. Of the nine crew members aboard, two survived the crash.^{[c]}

On 30 January, B-52E (tail number 57‑0018) attached to 6th Bombardment Wing out of Walker AFB, New Mexico, crashed when the tail broke off in turbulence. The aircraft crashed over the Sangre de Cristo Mountains ten miles (16 km) northwest of Mora, New Mexico. Of the crew on board, two died and four ejected successfully.^{[g]}

On 19 November, another "E" model (tail number 56‑0655) from 6th Bombardment Wing was destroyed in a fire during maintenance work at Walker AFB, New Mexico.^{[f]} No injuries have been recorded.

On 23 December, B-52F (tail number 57‑0043) from 454th Bombardment Wing out of Columbus AFB crashed minutes after takeoff. The aircraft flew into clouds shortly after takeoff and came out of the clouds inverted and crashed into the ground. All nine on board died.^{[g]}

=== 1964 ===
A "Broken Arrow" incident: On 13 January 1964, the vertical stabilizer broke off B-52D (tail number 55‑0060, call sign "Buzz 14") causing a crash on Savage Mountain in western Maryland. After an Operation Chrome Dome mission to Europe, the aircraft was being ferried from Westover AFB to Turner AFB, in Albany, Georgia. While cruising at about 30,000 feet (9,100 m) excessive turbulence in a winter storm caused structural failure of the aircraft; the fin and rudder assembly was wrenched off the aircraft. The two MK53 nuclear bombs being ferried were found "relatively intact in the wreckage". Four of the crew of five ejected but two of them died due to exposure from the winter cold.^{[e]}

On 7 February, an RB-52B (tail number 52‑0009) from 93rd Bombardment Wing out of Castle AFB crashed near Tranquility, California, 23 miles (37 km) southwest of Fresno, due to fire in the hydraulic system. The crew of seven successfully bailed out.^{[b]}

On 10 November, B-52D (tail number 55‑0108) of the 462nd Strategic Aerospace Wing from Larson AFB crashed 60 miles (97 km) southeast of Glasgow AFB, Montana while on a low-level mission. The crew of seven was killed.^{[e]} The mission was to make a low-level pass for training a new navigator and testing ground avoidance equipment. The first entry point was the Flint Rock Oil Burner Run where aircraft was flying a mostly level flight path missing the first knoll at 2,550 feet (780 m) elevation. It continued until crashing on a second knoll approximately 300 feet (91 m) farther on the line of flight.

=== 1965 ===
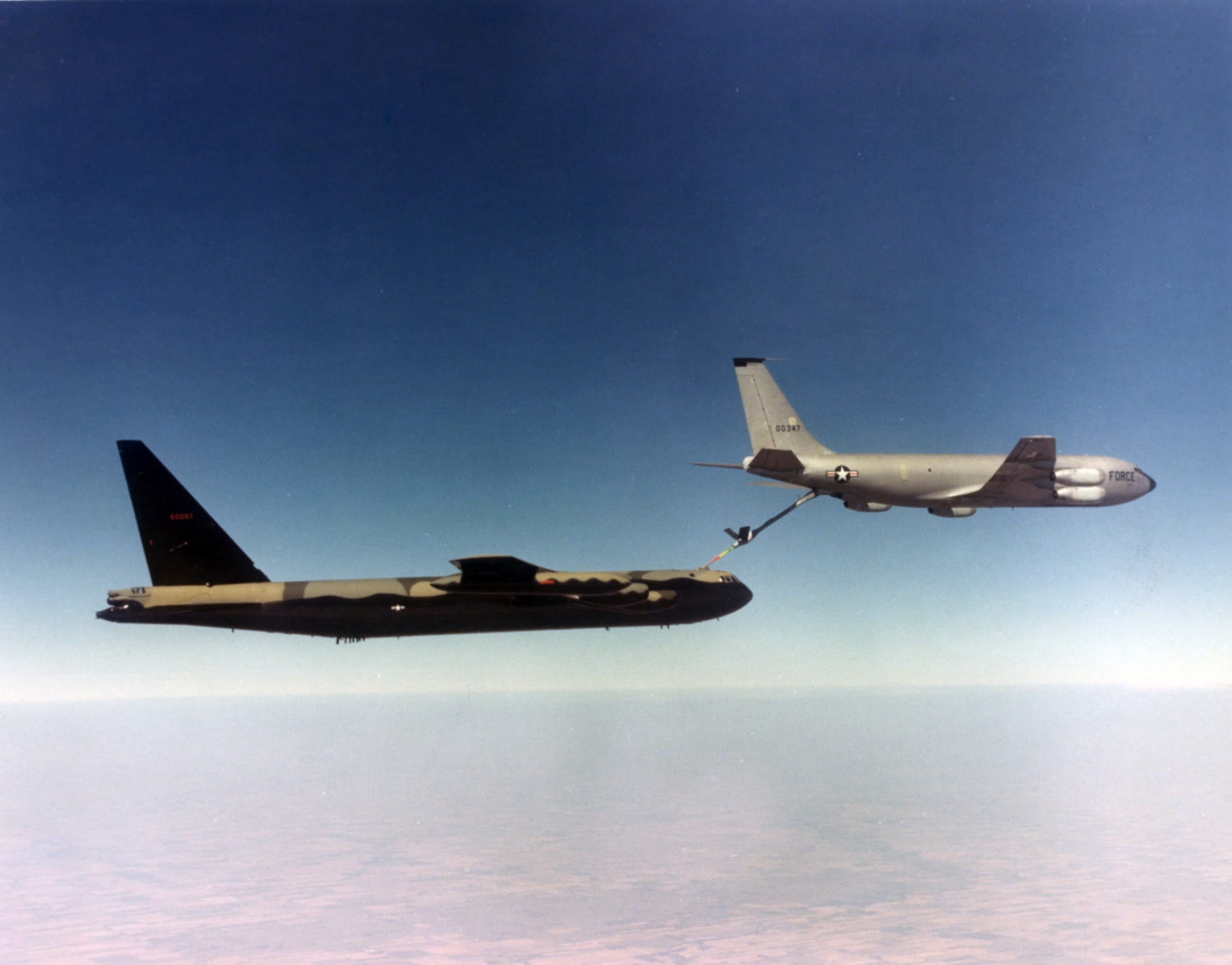
A KC-135A refuels a B-52D

On 18 June, two B-52Fs (tail numbers 57‑0047 and 57‑0179) collided mid-air during a refueling maneuver at 33,000 feet (10,000 m) above the South China Sea. The head-on collision took place at night just northwest of the Luzon Peninsula, Philippines, in the sky above Super Typhoon Dinah, a Category 5 Hurricane with maximum winds of 185 mph (298 km/h) and waves reported as high as 70 feet (21 m). Both aircraft were from the same squadron (441st Bombardment Squadron) of the 7th Bombardment Wing (Heavy), Carswell AFB, Texas and assigned to 3960th Strategic Wing operating out of Andersen AFB, Guam. Eight of twelve total crew members in the two airplanes were killed. The rescue of four crew members who had managed to eject only to parachute into one of the largest typhoons of the 20th century remains one of the most remarkable survival stories in the history of aviation. The crash was the first combat mission ever for the B-52.^{[g]} The two jets were part of a 30 airplane deployment on an inaugural Operation Arc Light mission to a military target about 25 miles (40 km) northwest of Saigon (now Ho Chi Minh City) South Vietnam.

=== 1966 ===
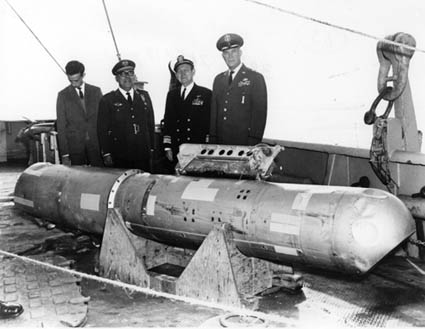
The thermonuclear bomb that fell into the sea recovered off Palomares, Almería, 1966

A "Broken Arrow" incident: On 17 January 1966, a fatal collision occurred between a B-52G (tail number 58‑0256) from 68th Bombardment Wing out of Seymour Johnson AFB and a KC-135 Stratotanker (tail number 61-0273) over Palomares, Almería, Spain, killing all four on the tanker and three of the seven on the B-52G. The two unexploded B-28 FI 1.45-megaton-range nuclear bombs on the B-52 were eventually recovered; the conventional explosives of two more bombs detonated on impact, with serious dispersion of both plutonium and uranium, but without triggering a nuclear explosion. After the crash, 1,400 metric tons (1,500 short tons) of contaminated soil was sent to the United States.^{[h]} In 2006, an agreement was made between the United States and Spain to investigate and clean the pollution remaining from the accident.

On November 18, the crew departed Barksdale AFB, Louisiana, in B-52G (tail number 58‑0228) on a training flight to K. I. Sawyer AFB south of Marquette, Michigan. The goal of the mission was to test the performance of a new ground reconnaissance radar. While cruising by night at low altitude, the airplane struck some trees, stalled, and crashed south of Stone Lake, Wisconsin or 14 miles (23 km) north-northeast of Hayward, Wisconsin. All nine crew members died.^{[h]}

=== 1967 ===
On 5 July, a B-52G (tail number 57‑6494) from the 72nd Bombardment Wing crashed into the ocean after take‑off from Ramey AFB, Puerto Rico, approximately 5 miles (8.0 km) from the base. Three crew members managed to eject and survive but four others died.^{[g]} It was determined that a life raft stowed behind the co-pilot's seat inflated and forcing him into the control column, pushing the nose of the aircraft down and causing the crash.

Two B-52Ds collided in mid-air on 7 July over the South China Sea off the coast of Vietnam. The aircraft crashed into the Mekong River Delta, about 100 kilometres (62 mi) south of Saigon. Both aircraft were on an Operation Arc Light mission assigned to the 4133rd Strategic Wing (Provisional) out of Andersen AFB, Guam, on a bombing mission over the A Sầu Valley. In one aircraft (tail number 56‑0627, call sign "Red 1") from the 22nd Bombardment Wing, four crew members survived but the other three were never found. From the other aircraft (tail number 56‑0595, call sign "Red 2") from the 454th Bombardment Wing, three crew members died, three survived, and one is listed as missing in action (MIA).^{[f]}

After a bombing mission over the A Shau Valley on 8 July, a B-52D (tail number 56-0601) from 454th Bombardment Wing, on temporary duty with 4133rd Strategic Wing out of Andersen AFB, Guam, crashed and burned after overshooting the runway and sliding into a minefield. The aircraft was on an Operation Arc Light mission from Andersen AFB, Guam, to U-Tapao Royal Thai Navy Airfield (RTNAF). The aircraft was hit by ground fire causing a complete hydraulic failure. The pilot made the decision to divert to Da Nang Air Base. The aircraft could not deploy flaps and did not have full braking power, so the aircraft landed at an abnormally high speed. After completing a landing with flaps raised, the B-52 touched down 1,000 feet past the runway threshold; travelling 6,000 feet (1,800 m) it overran the end of the runway at a speed of 100 knots (120 mph; 190 km/h) struck a drainage ditch, and came to rest in a minefield and exploded. Five crew members died; only the tail gunner survived because he was in the tail section which broke away from the airplane.^{[f]}

On 2 November, a B-52H (tail number 61‑0030) from the 319th Bombardment Wing crashed at Griffiss AFB, Rome, New York. The aircraft lost control during an instrument approach when power was lost on the number 5 and 6 engines.^{[k]} The captain decided to return for a safe landing. While descending through an altitude of 2,000 feet (610 m) two of the crew members ejected forcing the aircraft to become unstable and out of control, crashing few miles from the airbase, killing all six remaining crew members.

=== 1968 ===
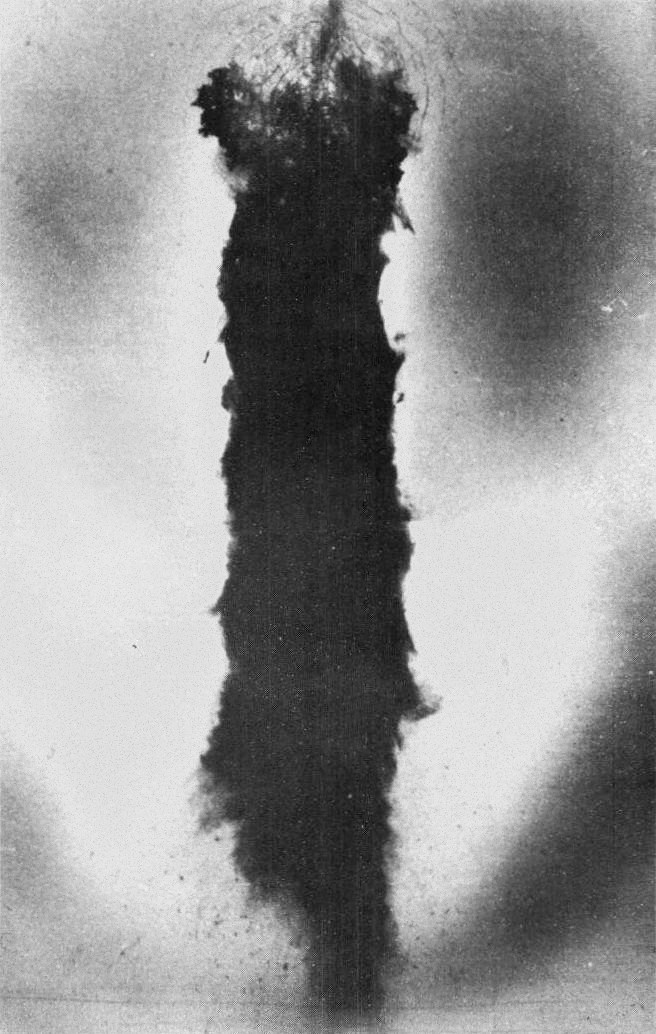
Thule AB B-52 Crash Site

A "Broken Arrow" incident: On 21 January, a B-52G (tail number 58‑0188, call sign "Hobo 28") with the 528th Bomb Squadron, 380th Strategic Aerospace Wing from Plattsburgh AFB, New York, with four nuclear bombs aboard as part of Operation Chrome Dome, crashed on the ice of the North Star Bay while attempting an emergency landing at Thule Air Base, Greenland.^{[h]} A faulty heater caused a fire during flight which knocked out electrical power. The crew successfully ejected over Thule AB, except for copilot Leonard Svitenko who was killed bailing out through a hatch manually. The airplane dove into the ground and crashed onto the ice sea 7 miles (11 km) southwest of the base. The high explosives on the four thermonuclear bombs detonated on impact, causing contamination, but no nuclear detonation. The resulting fire caused extensive radioactive contamination, the cleanup (Project Crested Ice) lasting until September 1968. Following closely on the Palomares incident, the cleanup costs and political consequences proved too high to risk again, so Strategic Air Command ended the airborne alert program the following day.

On 29 February, a B-52F (tail number 70173) crashed in Matagorda Bay, Texas in the Gulf of Mexico. The aircraft was attached to the 7th Bombardment Wing at Carswell Air Force Base in Fort Worth TX. The crash killed all eight crew members on board. The cause of the crash is unknown and its current DoD status is "downed in an unknown location." Two weeks after the disappearance, some fragmented sections of the wing (trailing edge near fuselage) identified by Boeing as coming from a B-52 washed ashore on South Padre and Mustang Islands.^{[g]}

On 29 August, a B-52C (tail number 54‑2667) from the 306th Bombardment Wing out of McCoy AFB, Florida, crashed due to an electrical failure and fuel starvation. The aircraft crashed near Cape Canaveral (then Cape Kennedy) Florida, and exploded. All crew members evacuated.^{[d]}

On 4 October, a B-52H (tail number 60-0027) from the 5th Bombardment Wing (Heavy), Minot AFB, North Dakota crashed on landing. On final approach at night, the engines on the left wing went out due to fuel mismanagement. This and the low speed of the airplane caused a stall and crash in an open field located eight miles (thirteen kilometres) from the airbase. The aircraft was destroyed. Two crew members were rescued while four others died. The pilot ejected but was hit by a falling hatch after he ejected and fatally injured. The tail gunner bailed out too low and hit the ground before his parachute opened. Among the dead was a lieutenant colonel just days from retirement, and the squadron clerk, on his first B-52 orientation ride.

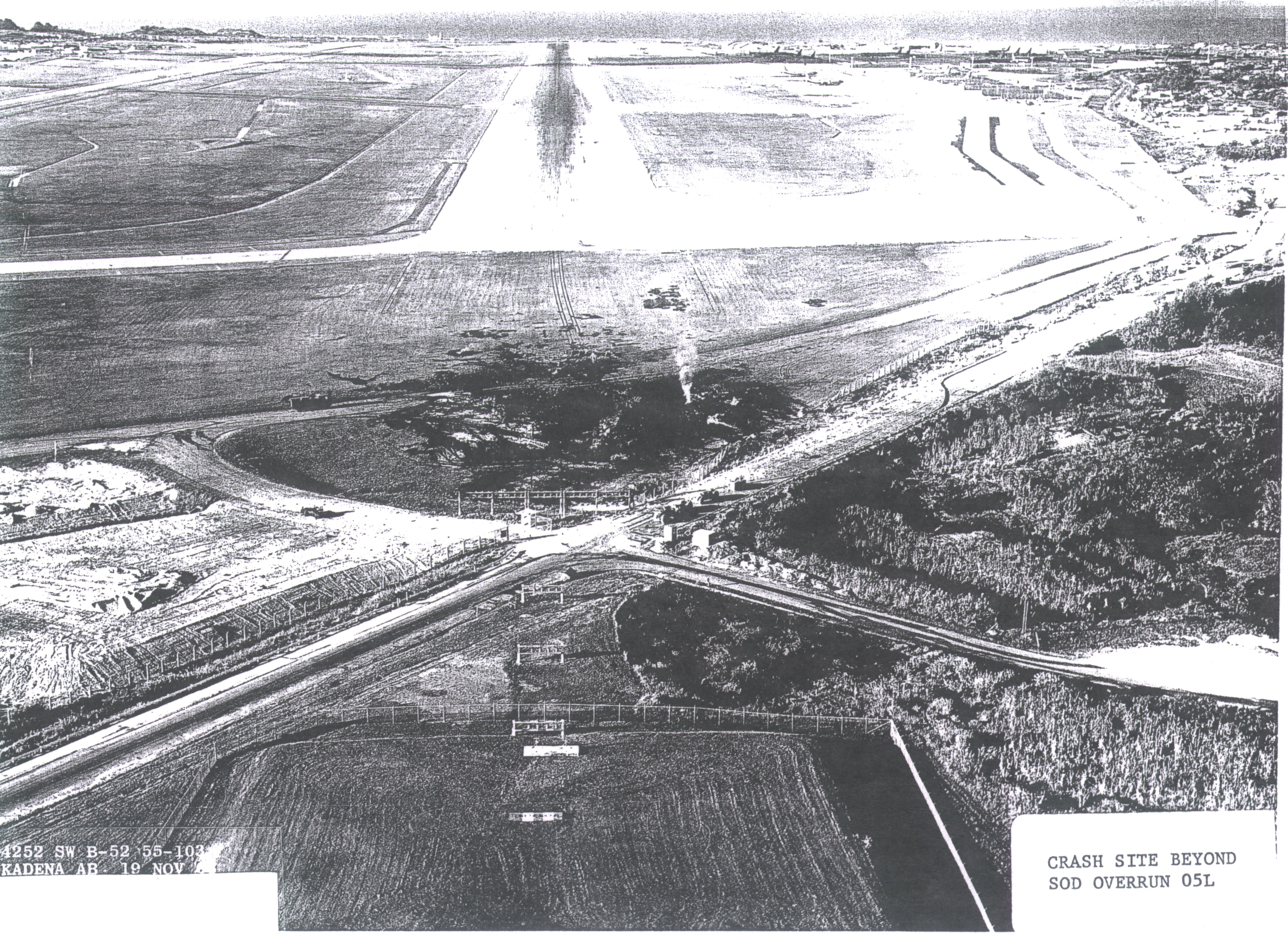
B-52 crash site at Kadena AB.

On 18 November, a B-52D (tail number 55‑0103, call sign "Cream 2") from the 346th Bombardment Squadron of the 99th Bombardment Wing attached to the 306th Bombardment Wing on a flight to Vietnam crashed at Kadena AB in Okinawa, Japan (home base of 4252d Strategic Wing the aircraft was attached to). The aircraft crashed and burned after an aborted takeoff. The bomb load exploded. All eight crew members on board evacuated the aircraft before the bombs exploded but two subsequently died of burns.^{[e]}

On 23 November, Major Eugene Ray McCune ejected over the South China Sea and is presumed dead. His aircraft, a B-52 with 96th Bombardment Wing at Dyess AFB, Texas was on temporary duty to 337th Bombardment Squadron, 4133rd Strategic Wing at Andersen AFB, Guam. It was refueling north of the Philippines while on a mission to Vietnam when he ejected from the aircraft. It is unknown why he ejected. After the ejection, his aircraft dropped their bomb load into the sea and diverted to Ching Chuan Kang AB, Taiwan. He was declared dead on 7 December 1968.

On 3 December, a B-52D (tail number 55‑0115) overshot the runway on landing and caught fire at Kadena AFB, Okinawa. The aircraft was with the 306th Bombardment Wing at Kadena AFB attached to 4252d Strategic Wing.^{[e]} All seven crew members escaped uninjured while the aircraft was destroyed.

=== 1969 ===
On 21 January, a B-52H (tail number 61-0037) with the 5th Bombardment Wing, Minot AFB, North Dakota, crashed shortly after takeoff. The aircraft climbed to 200 to 300 feet (60 to 90 m) above the ground when it stalled, crashed, and exploded in a field about one mile (1.6 km) away. All six crew members died; the cause of the crash was an incorrect preflight fuel load distribution.^{[k]}

Upon attempting to land at Castle AFB, California, on 8 May, a B-52F (tail number 57-0149) from 93rd Bombardment Wing crashed short of the runway and burned. The aircraft was destroyed but all seven crew members were rescued albeit suffered injuries.^{[g]}

On 17 March, the entire inboard engine pod tore away from the right wing of a B-52H (tail number 60-0003) of the 524th Bombardment Squadron during climbout from Wurtsmith Air Force Base in Michigan on a practice bombing mission. Instruments for the right outboard engines simultaneously indicated total engine failure and the fire warning lights illuminated. The flight crew pulled the fire extinguisher handles, but discovered that the aircraft would uncontrollably bank to the left when power was reduced to the four left engines; they deduced that the inner pod separation had damaged controls and instrumentation for the outboard pod, leaving the right outboard engines irreversibly jammed at climb power. Deciding that it was unsafe to land with two uncontrollable engines and not wanting to risk an ejection and deliberate crash, the crew deliberately starved the right outboard engines by transferring fuel out of the No. 4 main tank. After flying for several hours over Lake Huron to reduce the fuel load, the pilots performed a safe landing at Wurtsmith with only the four left engines functioning and the flaps retracted due to concerns that they might not function properly. The two inboard engines were found in a wooded area near the base. The crew was decorated for outstanding airmanship, and the aircraft was subsequently repaired and placed back in service.

On 10 May, a B-52D (tail number 56-0593) crashed into the Pacific Ocean after takeoff from Andersen AFB, Guam. The aircraft, with the 393d Bombardment Squadron, 509th Bombardment Wing, Pease AFB, New Hampshire, attached to 4133rd Strategic Wing (Provisional), Andersen AFB was en route to a mission over Vietnam. Shortly after a night takeoff and climbing to a low altitude, the pilot turned to the right and then control was lost. The aircraft disintegrated on impact and all six crew members died.^{[f]}

While taking off from U-Tapao Royal Thai Navy Airfield in heavy rain on an Operation Arc Light mission on 19 July, a B-52D (tail number 55-0676) crashed and caught fire when it overran the runway on takeoff. The pilot and co-pilot had different readings on their airspeed indicators, so they decided to abort the takeoff. The crew managed to exit the aircraft safely. An HH-43B Huskie (tail number 59-1562) responded to the crash to battle the fire and rescue the crew; in an unfortunate twist of fate, upon approaching the crash site, the bombs on the B-52 exploded, destroying the helicopter. Two of three crew aboard the helicopter died.^{[e]}

On 27 July, a "D" model (tail number 56‑0630) from the 509th Bombardment Wing, Andersen AFB, Guam, crashed on the runway during takeoff from Andersen. The aircraft made an initial departure from the runway and then lost control and burned. It is believed that structural failure caused the right wing to separate from the fuselage during the takeoff run. All six members of the crew died.

After takeoff from Loring AFB, while in initial climb, on 4 September, a B-52G (tail number 58‑0215) crashed and exploded two to three miles (3.2 to 4.8 km) north of the airbase near the Maine–New Brunswick border. The crew encountered unknown technical issues. All seven members of the crew died; two members ejected but their parachutes opened too late.

On 9 October, a B-52F (tail number 0172) from 329th Bomb Squadron, 93rd Bomb Wing, Castle AFB, California, crashed and burst into flames on the runway. The crew was training, performing touch-and-go maneuvers. The aircraft pitched up during overshoot resulting in a loss of control. The tail stalled and the aircraft crashed onto the runway. All six crew members died.

Twelve days later, on 21 October, at the same base and the same wing (the 93rd Bomb Wing) an "F" model (tail number 57-0041) crashed and subsequently was destroyed by a post-crash fire. On touchdown, the crew lost control, veered off the runway, and came to rest in flames. All six crew members escaped uninjured.

== 1970–1979 ==
=== 1970 ===
On 3 April, a B-52D (tail number 55‑0089) of the 28th Bombardment Wing at Ellsworth AFB, South Dakota, crashed and was destroyed after a landing accident. On landing, the aircraft skidded into a brick storage building containing 25,000 US gallons (95,000 L) of jet fuel. All nine crew escaped uninjured. The navigator was trapped inside the nose section of the airplane for almost an hour before being rescued by the base firefighters. The firefighters also used their fire truck to ram the gun turret to free the tail gunner.^{[e]} Several of the firemen received medals for their heroism.^{[e]}

On 19 July, a B-52G (Tail number 58‑0208) from the 42nd Bombardment Wing out of Loring AFB, Maine, was destroyed in a ground fire on the ramp at the base. There were no injuries.^{[h]}

=== 1971 ===
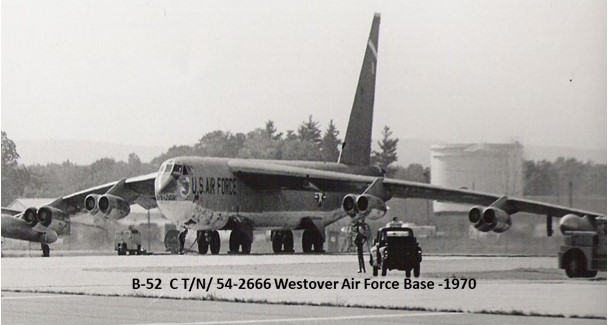
B-52 tail number 54-2666

On 7 January, a B-52C (tail number 54-2666) of the 346th Bombardment Squadron, 99th Bombardment Wing out of Westover AFB, Massachusetts, crashed into northern Lake Michigan at the mouth of Little Traverse Bay near Charlevoix, Michigan, while on a low-level training flight. All nine crew members were lost and their remains never recovered. Initially, due to bad weather in the days following the accident, an underwater search for wreckage yield nothing and a cause of the crash could not immediately be determined. However, a second search effort mounted in the spring of 1971 led to the discovery of the downed bomber on the lake bottom in a 1600x2400 square yard debris field. The wreckage was retrieved by June 1971 and reassembled in a hanger at Kincheloe AFB near Sault Ste Marie, Michigan. The cause was determined to be metal fatigue in the structure of the wings due to years of use in low-level mission training, an unintended consequence of the Air Force's decision to use Boeing's high altitude bomber design for low-level missions following the shoot down of Francis Gary Powers' Lockheed U-2 spy plane in 1960. The crash of this B-52 prompted the retirement of the remaining model B-52Cs at Westover AFB.

=== 1972 ===
On 31 March, a 306th Bombardment Wing B-52D (tail number 56-0625, call sign "Sir 1") sustained multiple engine failures and an engine pod fire shortly after takeoff from McCoy AFB on a routine training mission. The aircraft was not carrying any weapons. The aircraft immediately attempted to return to the base but crashed 3,220 feet (980 m) short of the runway in a civilian residential area of Orlando immediately north of the airfield. The crash spread flaming jet fuel over the neighborhood, destroying or damaging eight homes. The crash and fire injured seven children and one adult on the ground. The crew of seven airmen and a 10-year-old boy on the ground died.^{[f]}

After an inflight engine failure, on 8 May, a B-52G (tail number 59‑2574) from the 416th Bombardment Wing, Griffiss AFB, New York overran the runway and crashed after aquaplaning during landing.^{[k]}^{[m]} While flying a low altitude route, one of the engines on the left wing malfunctioned and was shut down. On final approach to Griffiss, the co-pilot, following the checklist, turned on the starter switches for all the engines inadvertently including the shutdown engine. That engine now restarted during the descent and started to increase to maximum power. The pilots were unaware of this. With the engine at maximum power on landing, the airplane was unable to slow down enough to engage the brakes. The drag chute failed to deploy. The pilot at first elected to go around and increased power but then decided there was not enough runway remaining. The pilot then reduced power and announced to the crew that they were overrunning the runway. The impact broke the aircraft in half just behind the crew compartment. The airplane skidded down the embankment with the malfunctioning engine still running. The landing gear and AGM 28 Missiles sheared off the aircraft. The weather was a severe driving rainstorm. The official cause of the accident was listed as hydroplaning. After the crash investigation, the Boeing representative stated that the only reason the airplane did not explode on impact was due to the mud caused by the heavy rain. All crew members survived.

On 9 July, a B-52G (tail number 59‑2600) with the 72 Strategic Wing, Andersen AFB, Guam, crashed shortly after takeoff from the base. The aircraft was on a bombing Operation Linebacker mission to Vietnam. The investigation determined an improperly secured chin radome flew off during initial climb, causing the airplane to become unstable.^{[i]} When the radome detached, it struck the pitot tubes, causing the wrong data to be transmitted to the instruments. The crew decided to abandon the aircraft. The airplane was leveled off and allowed to slow to stable low-speed flight before the crew bailed out. Now out of control, the aircraft crashed into the sea and was destroyed. Several hours later, five crew members were found and rescued by the US submarines Barb and Gurnard during Typhoon Rita. A sixth occupant, Lt Col James Lloyd Vaughan, was missing; his parachute failed and he was killed. His body was found on Yap 42 days later.

On 30 July, a B-52D (tail number 56‑0677) of the 307th Strategic Wing from U-Tapao RTNAF, Thailand, crashed after a lightning strike and resulting fire knocked out the aircraft instruments and a fire started in the port wing. The crew lost control of the aircraft and it entered a dive. One crew member was able to eject safely; he was later recovered and evacuated. All five other occupants died.

On 15 October, a B-52D (tail number 55-0097) from the 43rd Strategic Wing at U‑Tapao RTAFB, Thailand crashed upon landing at the base for unknown reason. While the airplane was damaged beyond repair, all six crew members escaped uninjured.^{[e]}

On 20 November, the first B-52 was lost to enemy action. A B-52D (tail number 55‑0110, call sign "Olive 2") from the 6th Bombardment Wing attached to the 307th Strategic Wing, U‑Tapao RTAFB, Thailand, was hit by a surface-to-air missile (SAM) over Vinh, North Vietnam. The aircraft caught fire, but it made it back to Thailand and crashed 15 miles (24 km) southwest of Nakhon Phanom Royal Thai Navy Base, Thailand. The crew ejected safely.^{[m]}

==== Operation Linebacker II ====
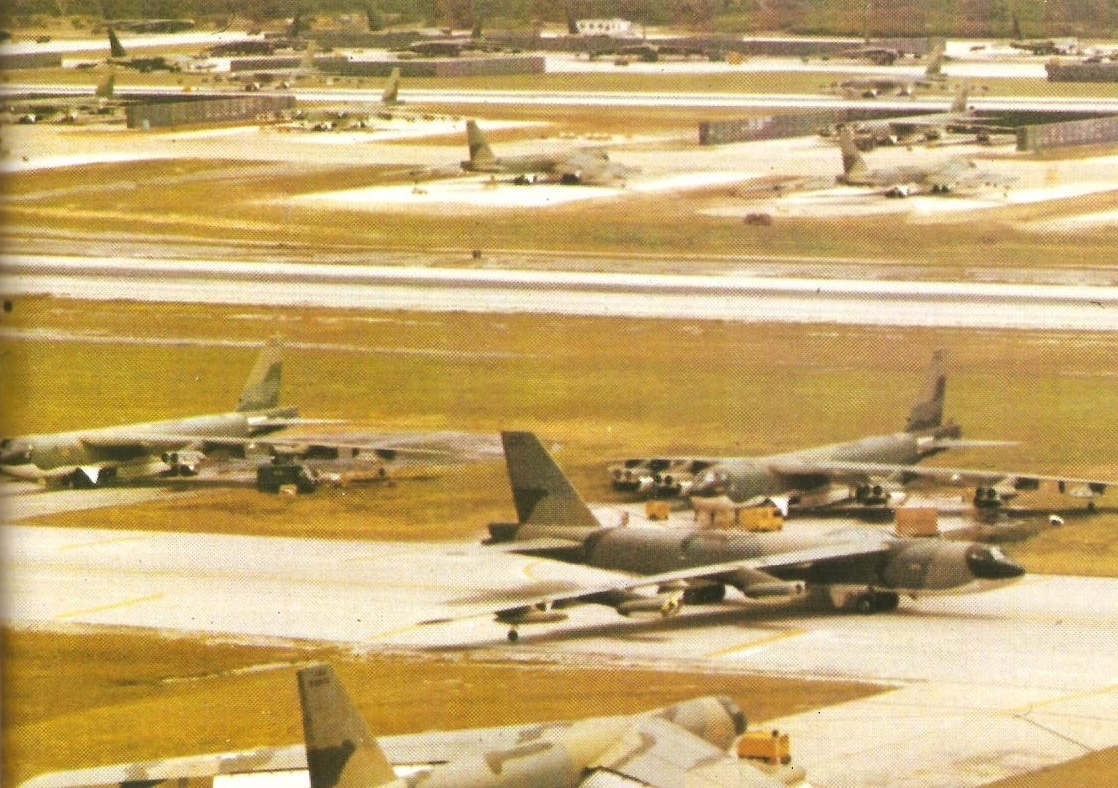
B-52s at Andersen AFB, Guam during Operation Linebacker II

Operation Linebacker II was a strategic bombing campaign conducted by the United States against targets in North Vietnam from 18 to 29 December 1972, as part of the Vietnam War. This operation was a particularly dangerous and destructive two weeks for the B-52 and its crews. The following incidents involving B-52s occurred associated with this operation:

===== 18 December =====
- A "D" model (tail number 56-0608, call sign "Rose 1") from the 99th Bombardment Wing, Westover AFB, attached to the 307th Strategic Wing, Thailand, was shot down. While flying over Hanoi, the aircraft was hit by a SA-2 surface-to-air missile and crashed into the Huu Tiep Lake located in the center of Hanoi. Two crew members died while four others were taken prisoners of war. Several large pieces of wreckage form a war memorial at the lake, and others are displayed in the nearby museum.^{[f]}

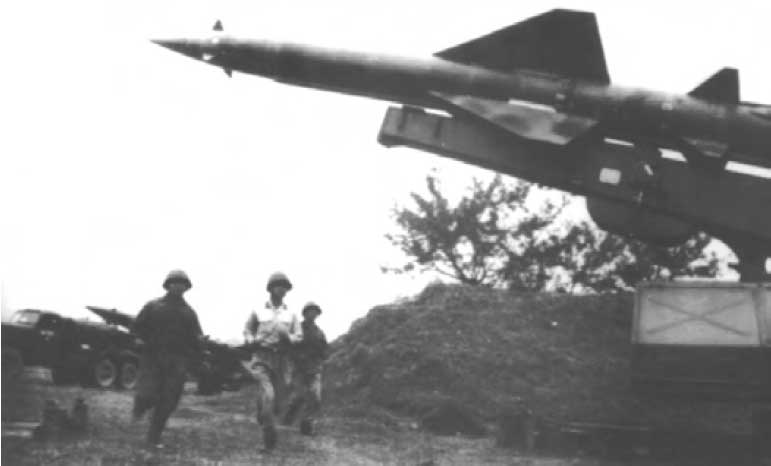
An SA-2 surface-to-air missile in North Vietnam.

- A "G" model (tail number 58‑0246, call sign "Peach 02"^{[a]} or "Preach 02") from the 2nd Bombardment Wing (Heavy), Barksdale AFB, Louisiana, attached to the 72nd Strategic Wing (Provisional) Andersen AFB, Guam, was hit by a surface-to-air missile. The crew was able to maintain control and depart for the Royal Thai Air Base Nam Phong in Thailand but was eventually forced to abandon the aircraft. All seven crew members successfully exited the aircraft, parachuted to the ground, and were rescued. The aircraft crashed in an isolated area located about 30 kilometres (19 mi) southwest of Nam Phong and was destroyed.^{[h]}
- A "G" model (tail number 58-0201) callsign "Charcoal 01", with the 340th Bomb Squadron, of the 97th Bombardment Wing based in Blytheville AFB, Arkansas, attached to the 72nd Strategic Wing, Andersen AFB, Guam crashed in a field near Yên Viên, North Vietnam, after being hit by a SA-2 surface-to-air missile while flying over Hanoi.^{[m]} The airplane was destroyed. The aircraft had six crew members on board: three crew members were taken prisoners of war while three others died.^{[g]}

===== 20 December =====
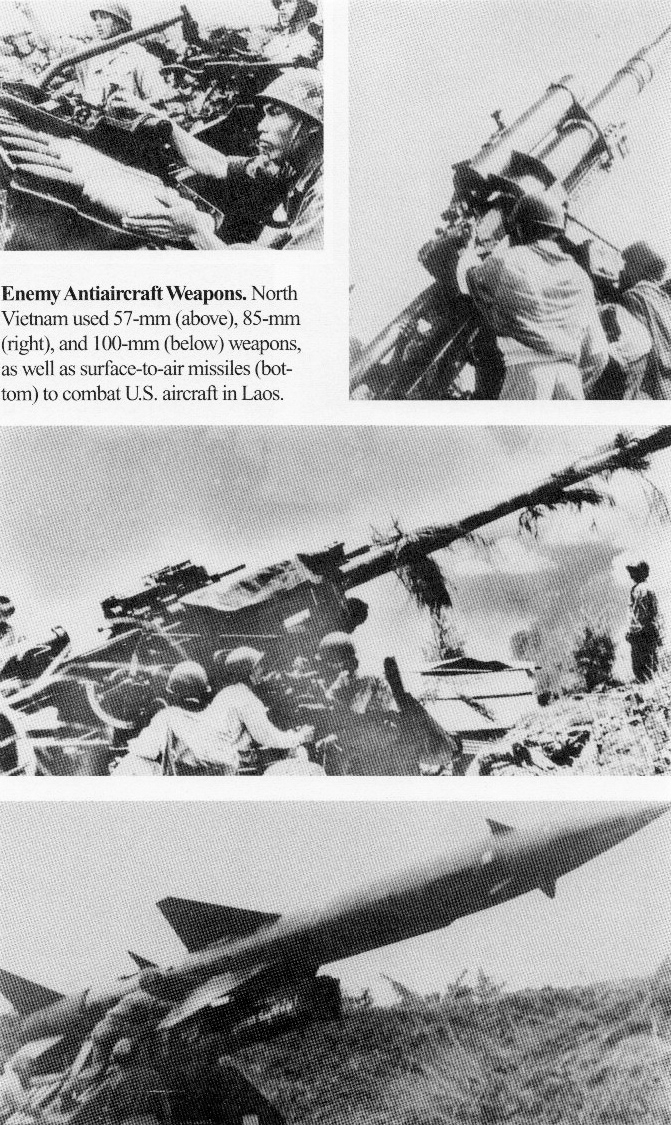
North Vietnamese Antiaircraft Weapons. The SA-2 Surface-to-Air Missile in the bottom picture.

- A "D" model (tail number 56‑0622, call sign "Orange 03") from the 7th Bombardment Wing, Westover AFB, Massachusetts, attached to the 307th Strategic Wing, Thailand was hit by a SA-2 surface-to-air missile while over the target. The aircraft burst into a fireball and crashed approximately 35 kilometres (22 mi) east of Khon Kaen, Thailand. A search and rescue effort was not conducted because of the heavy enemy fire and the fact that the crash location was deep in enemy territory. It was later learned that two of the six crew members survived the crash and were held as prisoners of war in North Vietnam. The remains of two of the crew members who died have been recovered; however, the other two remain unaccounted for.
- A "G" model (tail number 57-6496, call sign "Quilt 03") from the 456th Bombardment Wing, Beale AFB, CA, attached to 72nd Strategic Wing, Andersen AFB, Guam, was shot down during an Operation Linebacker II mission. While flying over Hanoi, the aircraft was hit by enemy fire, a SA-2 surface-to-air missile, and crashed in Yên Viên. Two of the crew died while four ejected, were captured, and became POWs.^{[g]}^{[m]} Enemy control of the area prevented the immediate recovery of the remains of the two crew members killed. In September 1977, the remains were returned to U.S. custody.
- A "G" model (tail number 57-6481) from the 42nd Bombardment Wing, attached to 72nd Strategic Wing, was hit by a SA-2 surface-to-air missile ^{[g]}. While flying over Hanoi, the airplane was hit by enemy fire. The crew was able to leave the target area and to fly to Thailand but eventually, all six crew members were forced to bail out of the aircraft. It crashed about 16 kilometres (9.9 mi) southwest of Nakhon Phanom. The aircraft was destroyed while all six crew members survived.
- A "G" model (tail number 58-0198, call sign "Olive 01") with the 325th Bombardment Squadron, 92nd Bombardment Wing, Fairchild AFB, WA, assigned to 72nd Strategic Wing, Andersen AFB, Guam, was shot down by a SA-2 surface-to-air missile. While flying over Hanoi, the aircraft was hit by enemy fire and crashed in Kinh No. Four crew members died while three others were taken PoW. Attempts to reach the crash site were prevented by enemy control of the area, and the remains were not recovered at the time. In 1988, the Vietnamese government repatriated the remains of four dead crew members. Two of the POW's were returned to American custody on 29 March 1973. Different sources state the seventh crew member died in the crash and his remains were returned in 1974.
- A "D" model (tail number 56-669, call sign "Straw 02") with the 306th Bombardment Wing, March AFB, California, assigned to the 43rd Strategic Wing at Andersen AFB, Guam, was hit by a SA-2 surface-to-air missile. When the B-52 was over the target area, the missile detonated under the aircraft. The explosion injured one of the crew members and damaged two of the aircraft's engines as well as its electrical and navigational systems. The pilot attempted to fly to Thailand, but after 25 minutes, the strain on the remaining engines became excessive and the pilot ordered a bailout. Five crew members landed safely and were extracted by search and rescue helicopters; however, one of the crew members, the navigator, could not be located on the ground. Search and rescue efforts continued for five days but they were unsuccessful. Major Frank Alton Gould, the navigator, is listed as missing in action (MIA).^{[f]}
- A "G" (tail number 58-0169, call sign "Tan 03") with the 340th Bombardment Squadron (Heavy), 97th Bombardment Wing, Blytheville AFB, Arkansas, assigned to the 72nd Strategic Wing (Provisional), Andersen AB, Guam, was shot down. While flying over Hanoi, the aircraft was hit by enemy fire, an SA-2 surface-to-air missile, and crashed in Kinh No. A crew member survived while five others died.^{[g]}
- A "D" model (tail number 55‑0061, call sign "Scarlet 03") of the 22nd Bombardment Wing, attached to 96th Bombardment Wing was shot down by a SA-2 surface-to-air missile.^{[e]} While flying over Hanoi, the airplane was hit by enemy fire. The aircraft crashed in Bạch Mai, a district of Hanoi. Search and recovery efforts were not possible because the crash site was in well-defended enemy territory. Three crew members died while three others were taken PoW. The remains of two of those killed in the crash have been returned to American custody but the sixth crew member, the co-pilot, could not be recovered and is listed as MIA.
- A "D" (tail number 55-0050, call sign "Blue 01") from the 307th Bombardment Wing, assigned to the 43rd Strategic Wing, was shot down by two SA-2 surface-to-air missiles. All six crew members ejected and became POWs.^{[e]}

===== 26 December =====
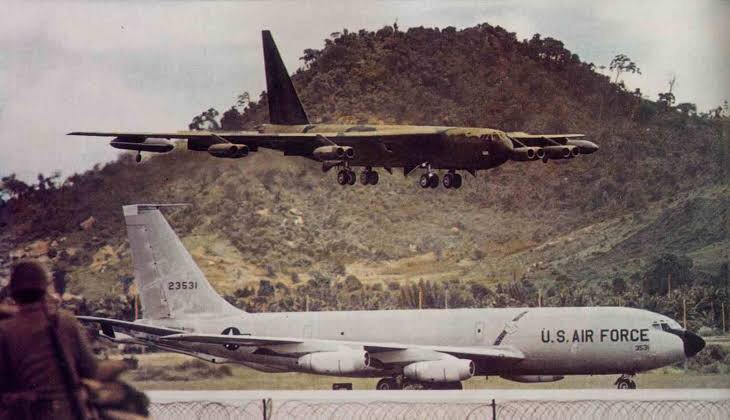
Boeing KC-135 StratoTanker and Boeing B-52 Stratofortress at U-Tapao Air Force Base in 1970.

- A "D" model (tail number 56‑0584, call sign "Ash 01") from the 22nd Bombardment Wing crashed while landing at U-Tapao RTNAF, Thailand. Four crew members died while two survived.^{[f]} While overflying the Hanoi area, the aircraft was hit by a SA-2 surface-to-air missile. The crew decided to leave the target area and to return to U-Tapao for an emergency landing. As the air gunner was wounded, the captain refused to bail out. On approach, four engines were out of service on the same side. The airplane crashed near the airbase and was destroyed.
- A "D" model (tail number 56‑0674, call sign "Ebony 02") from the 449th Bombardment Wing, Kincheloe AFB, attached to 307th Strategic Wing, U-Tapao RTNAF, Thailand.^{[f]} While overflying the Hanoi area, the aircraft was shot down by a North Vietnamese MiG-21 fighter and crashed in the district of Giáp Nhị in Hanoi. Two crew members died four others were rescued and taken PoW.

===== 27 December =====
- A "D" model (tail number 56-0599, call sign "Ash 01") from the 7th Bombardment Wing, assigned to 307th Strategic Wing, U-Tapao RTNAF, Thailand, crashed in Thailand after being hit by a SA-2 surface-to-air missile. The mission was to bomb the Van Dien supply area. At the first drop of the mission, several SA-2 missiles were fired at the aircraft. After the aircraft dropped its bombs over the target, the pilot turned steeply and then it was hit by a missile on the left wing which knocked out all four engines. Without power on the left wing and with 250 miles (400 km) to leave enemy territory, the pilot struggled to fly a course back to Thailand. The aircraft gained and lost altitude and speed until the bomber crossed over the Mekong River when the crew decided to bail out. All six crew members were rescued.^{[f]}
- Another "D" model (tail number 56-0605, call sign "Cobalt 01") of the 7th Bombardment Wing, assigned to 43rd Strategic Wing was shot down by a SA-2 surface-to-air missile. Two crew members were KIA while four ejected, were captured, and became POWs. The aircraft may also be the second B-52 to be claimed as an air-to-air victory for the MiG-21 This would correspond to Vu Xuan Thieu firing a K-13 (AA-2 Atoll) AAM from his MiG-21 based at Cam Thuy. The MiG-21 was also destroyed by the explosion. It is claimed that Vu Xuan Thieu deliberately rammed the B-52.^{[f]} The bodies of the two dead B-52 crew members were not immediately recovered. The Vietnamese government returned the remains of Bennie Lamar Fryer, the navigator, in 1977 and those of Allen Louis Johnson in 1985.

=== 1973 ===
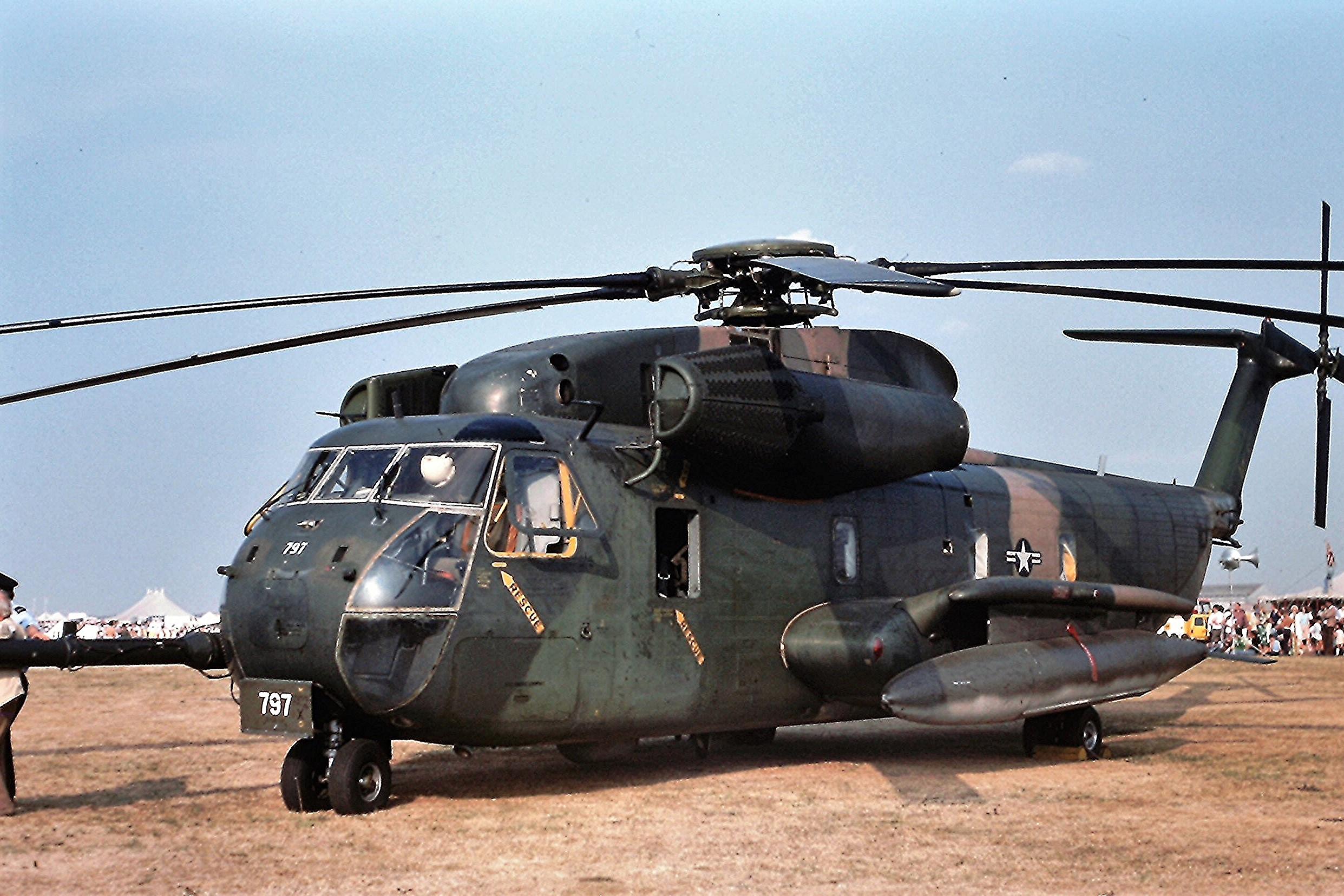
HH-53C helicopter used for aircrew rescue.

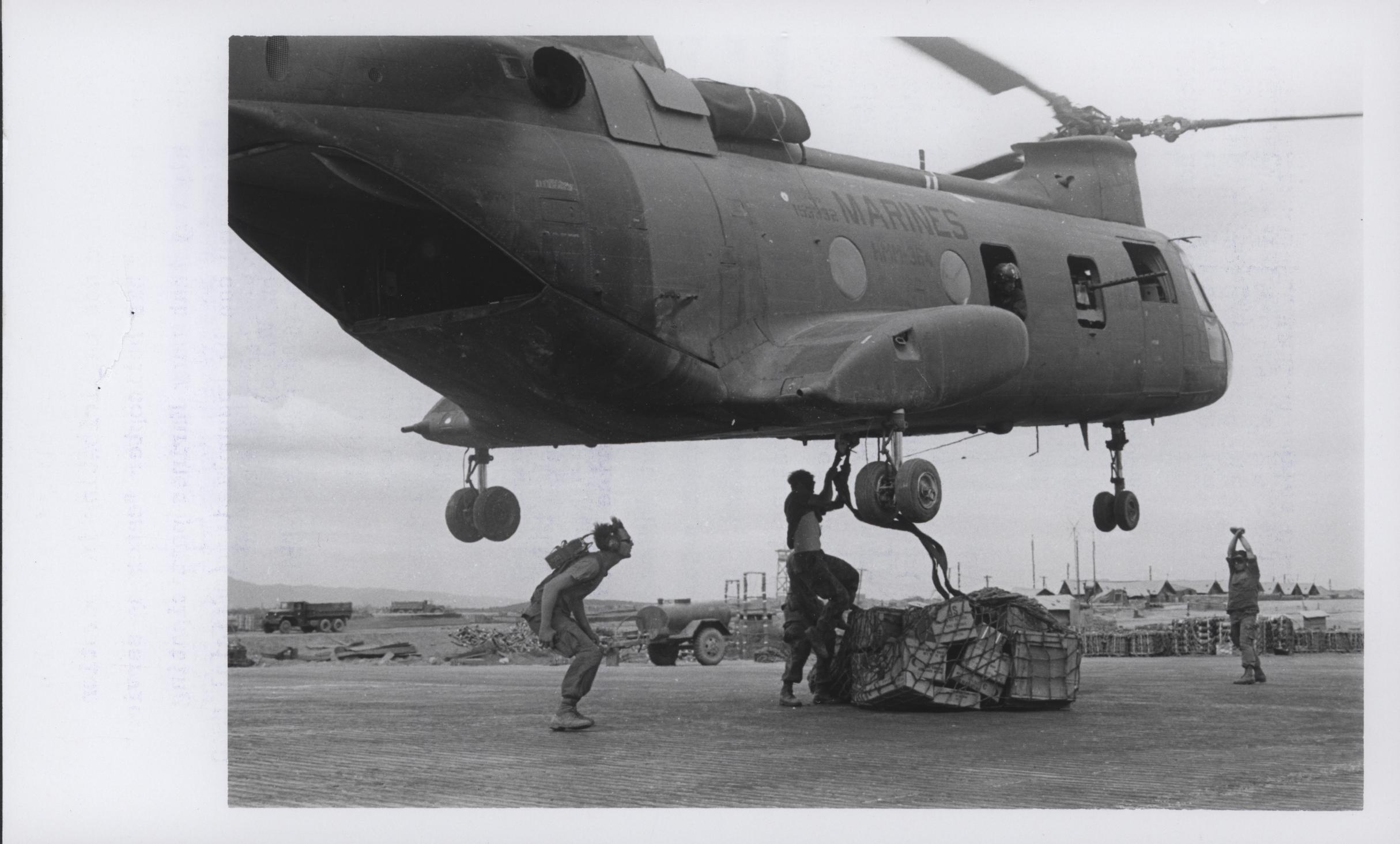
USMC CH-46 helicopter

On 3 January, a "D" model (tail number 55‑0056, call sign "Ruby 02") with the 307th Strategic Wing, U‑Tapao, Thailand crashed into the Gulf of Tonkin after the airplane was hit by a SA-2 surface-to-air missile while flying over Vinh, North Vietnam. The captain decided to evacuate the target area but with two engines out of service, electric, and hydraulic systems out, he ordered the crew to abandon the aircraft and to bail out over the South China Sea. The airplane and all six crew members were evacuated by the crew of a USAF HH-53 helicopter and USMC CH-46 helicopter.

On 13 January, another "D" (tail number 55‑0116) from the 43rd Strategic Wing out of U‑Tapao AB, Thailand, made an emergency landing at Da Nang AFB, South Vietnam with battle damage from SA-2 surface-to-air missile hits.^{[e]} While engaged in a bombing mission over North Vietnam, the airplane was hit by enemy fire. The captain decided to evacuate the target area and to divert to Đà Nẵng Airport for an emergency landing. After touchdown, the airplane was unable to stop within the remaining runway, overran, and came to rest. With the end of the Vietnam War imminent on 1 April 1973, the aircraft was scrapped 29 March because there was insufficient time to repair it.^{[e]} All six crew members escaped uninjured.

=== 1974 ===
On 8 February, a "G" model (tail number 58‑0174) from the 744th Bombardment Squadron, 456th Bombardment Wing, out of Beale AFB, California crashed shortly after takeoff on a night training mission. Just after liftoff, during the initial climb, the airplane went out of control, inverted, and crashed in an explosion. A crew member was seriously injured while all others were killed. A few days later, the only survivor died from his injuries.

On 30 May, a B-52H (tail number 60-0006) with 34th Bombardment Squadron crashed on the Wright Patterson AFB runway during a Ground-controlled approach landing.^{[j]} On final approach, the airplane went out of control and crashed in a field. All seven crew members were rescued while the aircraft was destroyed. The investigation showed that the rudder and elevator failed causing a loss of control.

On 12 December, a B-52D (tail number 55‑0058) from the 43rd Strategic Wing, Andersen AFB, Guam, experienced an instrument malfunction followed by a loss of control and a structural failure. The crew was completing a night training mission. While returning the airbase, control was lost and the airplane crashed into the sea about seven miles (11 km) southeast of the airfield. Four crew members died while two others were rescued. The aircraft sank and was lost. The aircraft had already survived being hit by three SA-2 surface-to-air missiles over Vietnam on 13/14 January 1974, but the plane was able to make it back to U-Tapao, Thailand.^{[e]}

=== 1975 ===
On 3 September, a B-52G (tail number 57‑6493) with the 68th Bombardment Wing out of Seymour Johnson AFB, North Carolina crashed between Aiken and Williston, South Carolina. While cruising at 28,000 feet (8,500 m), a fuel leak was experienced in the starboard wing which caused a structural failure of the wing, parting between the third and fourth engine nacelles (between number 5/6 and 7/8 engines). The wing then sheared off the horizontal stabilizer, causing the aircraft to be uncontrollable. The aircraft rolled inverted and exploded in flight. Four crew members survived but three died or were listed as missing.^{[g]}

While being refueled on the ramp early on 14 November, a B-52H (61–0033) caught fire and exploded at Minot AFB, North Dakota.^{[k]} Two refueling personnel died and the aircraft was destroyed.

=== 1977 ===
On 1 April, a B-52H (tail number 60-0039) out of the 410th Bombardment Wing, K. I. Sawyer AFB, Michigan, crashed after a night training mission. On approach in stormy weather, the pilot-in-command had the runway in sight when the airplane entered a cloudy area. The aircraft continued to descend until it struck the ground and crashed in flames. The aircraft was destroyed, and all eight crew members died.

=== 1978 ===
On 19 October, B-52D (tail number 56-0594) crashed on takeoff at March AFB, Riverside, California, due to loss of power on engines 1 and 2, and loss of water injection on the left wing. One crew member was seriously injured while five others died.

== 1980–1989 ==
=== 1980 ===
A B-52G (tail number (58–0209) with the 19th Bombardment Wing (Heavy) was destroyed on August 19, by a ground fire on the ramp at Robins AFB, Georgia.^{[g]}

=== 1981 ===
On 30 October, a "D" model (tail number 55-0078) with the 22nd Bombardment Wing crashed on a low-level night mission near La Junta, Colorado. All eight crew members died.^{[e]} The aircraft departed March AFB, California, on a night training flight. While cruising at low altitude (about 400 feet (120 m) above ground) to simulate an aerial attack, the airplane struck a sand dune then crashed and burned.

=== 1982 ===
On 29 November, a B-52G (tail number 56-2597) from 93rd Bombardment Wing, Castle AFB, CA, was destroyed in post-landing fire from the hydraulic system. After landing, hydraulic fluid from a leaking brake line ignited on the hot brakes, starting a fire in the nose landing gear wheel well. The crew managed to evacuate before the fuel tanks ignited, but the airplane was a total loss.^{[f]}

On 16 December, a B-52G (tail number 57‑6482) from 328th Bombardment Squadron, 93rd Bombardment Wing at Mather AFB, Sacramento, California, crashed upon takeoff.^{[m]} The crew was performing in a local training mission consisting of a Minimum Interval Takeoff and Landing (MITO) mission. The crew started the takeoff procedure ten seconds after the first B-52 that used the same runway. After liftoff, during the initial climb, the airplane encountered wake turbulences. The pilot-in-command decided to reduce engine power, but his reaction was excessive, causing all eight engines to flame out. Due to a loss of speed, the aircraft stalled and struck the ground. It exploded on impact and debris were scattered over a 400-yard (370 m) distance. All nine crew members died.

=== 1983 ===
On 26 January, a B-52G (tail number 57-6507) from the 319th Bombardment Wing (Heavy) out of Grand Forks AFB, North Dakota burned to the ground after post-flight maintenance of a fuel transfer valve. The valve was popping circuit breakers and technicians were performing fault isolation. The valve was energized in an almost empty fuel cell. Technicians were continually resetting the breaker. The valve motor ignited the explosive fuel vapor in the tank.

On 11 April, a B-52G (tail number 58-0161) of the 19th Bomb Wing out of Robins AFB, Georgia struck the slope of a mountain located twenty miles (32 km) north of St George, Utah. The airplane departed Robins AFB on an exercise (Red Flag mission) bound for California. En route, it deviated from the prescribed flight path several times and was assisted and reoriented by an Airborne early warning and control (AWACS) crew. While cruising over Utah in poor visibility, the crew failed to realize the altitude was insufficient.

=== 1984 ===
On 16 October, a B-52G (tail number 57-6479) from the 92nd Bombardment Wing, Fairchild AFB, Washington, crashed in Arizona. The aircraft was on a night training mission. The crew encountered an undisclosed technical issue and decided to abandon the aircraft. It crashed in a canyon located in Hunts Mesa, in the Navajo reservation about thirteen miles (21 km) northeast of Kayenta, Arizona. Two crew members died while five others were rescued. The gunner was struck by wreckage after ejection; one leg was severed. The other fatality was the observer in the IP seat who could not manually bailout before impact. The aircraft disintegrated on impact.^{[g]} An alternative explanation is that the aircraft struck the top of a ridge during low‑level flight training and broke apart.

=== 1988 ===
On 11 February, A B-52G (tail number 58-0219) from the 93rd Bombardment Wing, Castle AFB, CA, overran the runway was damaged beyond repair. During the takeoff roll, the decision to abort was taken for unknown reasons. Unable to stop within the remaining distance, the aircraft overran and came to rest. All crew members escaped uninjured.

B-52H (tail number 60-0040) caught fire just after takeoff at K. I. Sawyer AFB, MI and crashed 6 December. Aircraft just became airborne after a touch-and-go when an overheated fuel pump caused an explosion in the aft fuel tank. The explosion separated the tail section causing the aircraft to crash. The aircraft separated into three pieces; the crew compartment, the main body attached to the wings, and the tail section. The crew compartment slid more than 3,000 feet (910 m) down the runway. All eight crew members survived with injuries.

=== 1989 ===
A B-52G (tail number 58-0190) of the 2nd Bombardment Wing was damaged beyond repair on 24 July at Kelly AFB by a ground explosion during depot maintenance work.^{[g]} The ground crew was unaware that the fuel tank vents were plugged when they refueled the aircraft. The over-pressurization of the fuel system forced a large quantity of JP-4 fuel onto the floor under the aircraft where a static charge ignited the fuel. One worker, trapped in the cockpit, was killed and eleven were injured.

== 1990–1999 ==
=== 1991 ===
On 3 February, a B-52G (tail number 59‑2593, call sign "Hulk 46") from 4300th Bombardment Wing (Provisional) crashed into the Indian Ocean thirteen miles (21 km) north of the island of Diego Garcia. The aircraft was engaged in Operation Desert Storm when the crew encountered electrical and engine problems in flight. Three crew members were able to bail out while three others died as they ejected too late.

=== 1994 ===
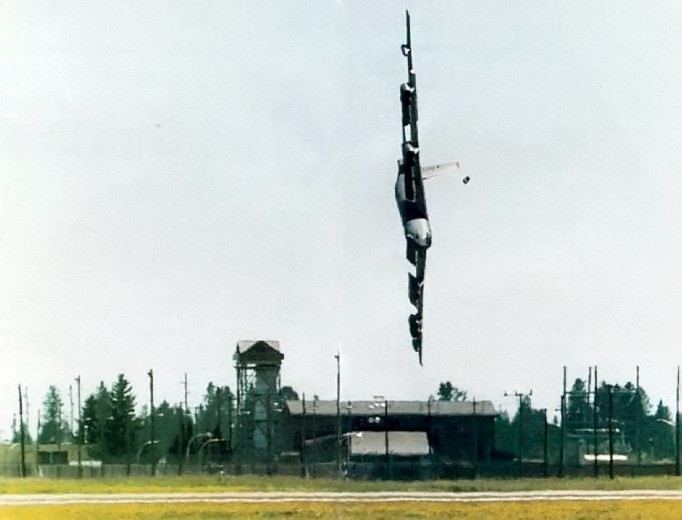
B-52 bomber seconds before crash at Fairchild Air Force Base.

On 24 June, B-52H (tail number 61-0026, call sign "Czar 52") with the 319th Bombardment Wing out of Grand Forks AFB, North Dakota crashed at Fairchild AFB, Washington, during practice for an airshow. While the aircraft was executing a "go-around", three-quarters of the way through the turn, the aircraft banked past 90 degrees, stalled, clipped a power line with the left wing, and crashed. All four crew members died in the accident.^{[k]}

== 2000–2009 ==
=== 2008 ===
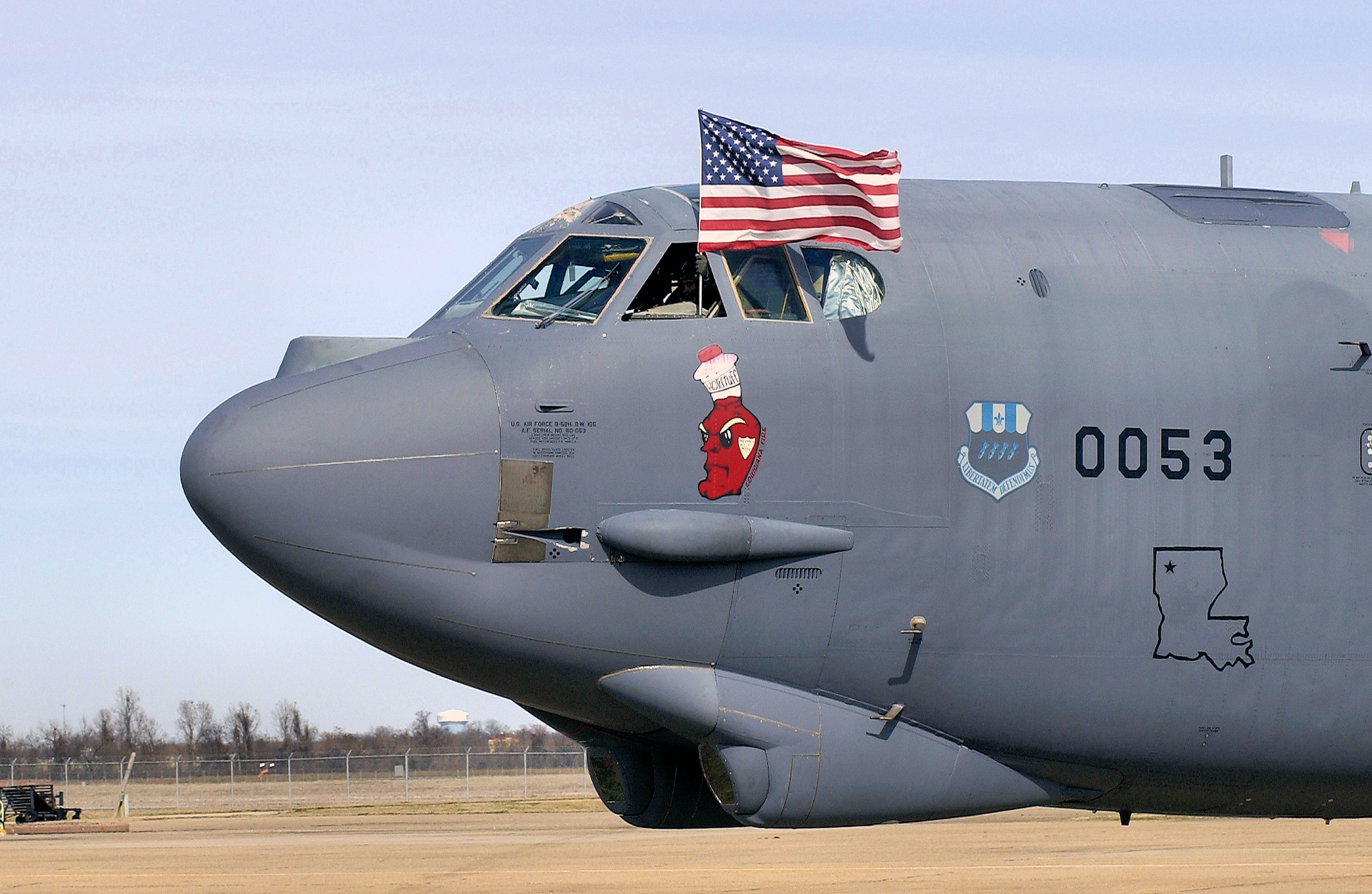
B-52 "Louisiana Fire".

On 21 July, a B-52H (tail number 60-0053) named "Louisiana Fire" with mission call sign "Raidr 21" from the 20th Bomb Squadron, 92nd Bombardment Wing deployed from Barksdale AFB, Louisiana, to Andersen AFB, Guam, crashed approximately 25 miles (40 km) northwest of Apra Harbor while on a flyby mission for the island's Liberation Day parade. All six crew members died (five standard crew members and a flight surgeon). The cause of crash was improper stabilizer trim setting.

== 2010–2019 ==
=== 2016 ===
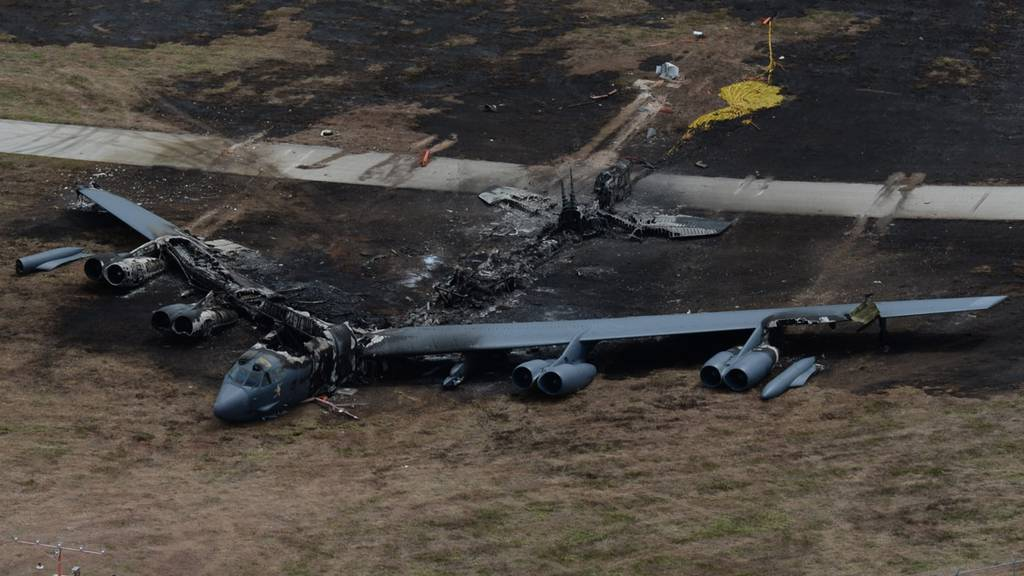
B-52H crash at Andersen Air Force Base.

On 19 May, a B-52H (tail number 60-0047) assigned to the 69th Bomb Squadron, 5th Bomb Wing, from Minot, North Dakota, overran the end of the runway during an aborted takeoff, crashed and burned at Andersen AFB, Guam. During takeoff, the crew noticed birds flying over the runway. They then had indications that the four engines on the right wing were reducing power. The crew believed that the aircraft had ingested birds into the right engines. The crew attempted an aborted takeoff; reducing engines to idle, applying air brakes, and activating the drag parachute. The parachute failed to inflate properly and with 2,500 feet (760 m) of runway remaining, the aircraft was unable to stop. It overran the paved surface of the runway by 300 feet (91 m). The crew evacuated safely and were treated for minor injuries. The aircraft burned completely at a loss of US$112 (equivalent to $167 in 2025) million.

== 2020–present ==
=== 2026 ===
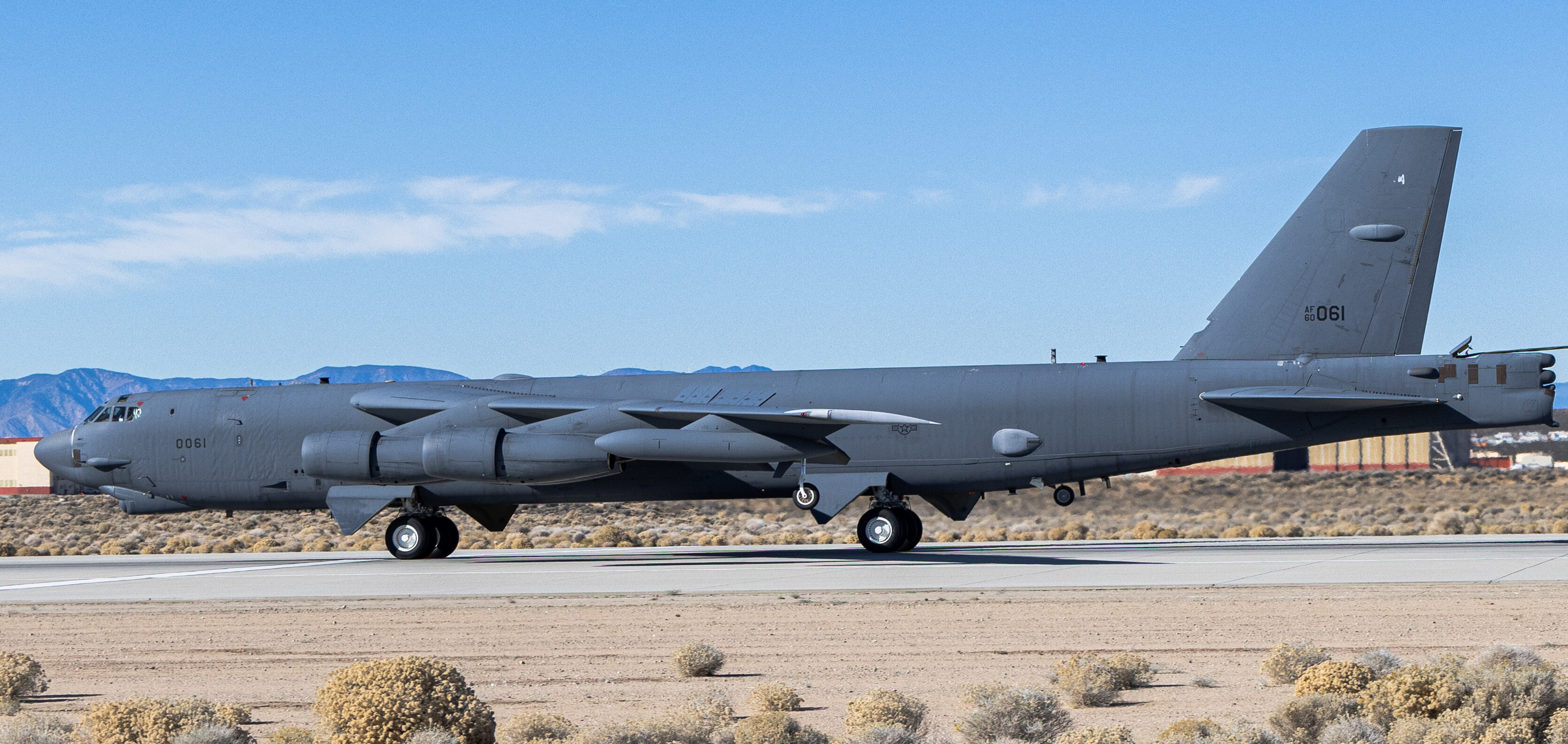
B52H 60-0061 at Edwards Air Force Base in December 2025.

On 15 June, a United States Air Force Boeing B-52H Stratofortress (tail number 60-0061) out of the 412th Test Wing crashed shortly after takeoff at Edwards Air Force Base in California at approximately 11:20 a.m. local time. Eight crew members were killed in the crash. The aircraft was named "Spirit of Aggieland II" in 2015 by Col. Bruce Cox, a Texas A&M University graduate who was then commander of the 307th Bomb Wing where the aircraft was based.
