= Allenwood =

Allenwood may refer to:

- Allenwood, County Kildare, a village in Ireland
  - Allenwood G.F.C., a Gaelic football club
- Allenwood, Ontario, Canada
- Allenwood, Cumbria, England
- Allenwood, Georgia, see List of places in Georgia (U.S. state) (A–D)
- Allenwood, New Jersey, United States
- Allenwood, Pennsylvania, United States
- Federal Correctional Complex, Allenwood, in Pennsylvania, United States, which includes:
  - United States Penitentiary, Allenwood, a high-security facility
  - Federal Correctional Institution, Allenwood Medium, a medium-security facility
  - Federal Correctional Institution, Allenwood Low, a low-security facility
- Allenwood Farm, a historic farm property in Plainfield, Vermont, United States
- HMAS Allenwood, an Australian World War II minesweeper

== See also ==
- Allen Wood (disambiguation)
