= Allen Wood =

Allen Wood may refer to:

- Allen K. Wood (1898–1977), American assistant director and production manager
- Allen W. Wood (born 1942), American philosopher
- Allen Wood (footballer) (1941–2018), Welsh footballer

== See also ==
- Allenwood (disambiguation)
- Allan Wood (1943–2022), Australian freestyle swimmer
- Alan Wood (disambiguation)
