= Plainfield (CDP), Vermont =

Census-designated place in Vermont, United States

Plainfield, Vermont
- Census-designated place
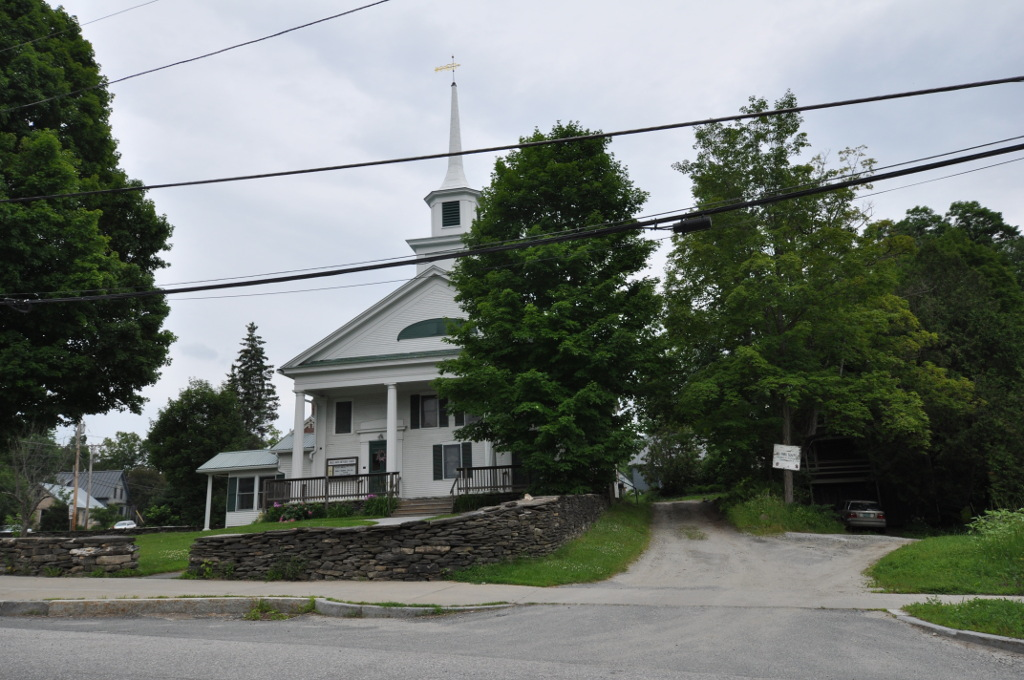
- Grace United Methodist Church

- Location in Washington County and the state of Vermont
- Coordinates: 44°16′45″N 72°25′51″W
- Country: United States
- State: Vermont
- County: Washington

Area
  - Total: 0.23 sq mi (0.60 km^{2})
  - Land: 0.23 sq mi (0.59 km^{2})
  - Water: 0.0039 sq mi (0.01 km^{2})
- Elevation: 807 ft (246 m)

Population (2010)
  - Total: 401
  - Density: 1,800/sq mi (680/km^{2})
- Time zone: UTC-5 (Eastern (EST))
  - Summer (DST): UTC-4 (EDT)
- ZIP code: 05667
- Area code: 802
- FIPS code: 50-55750
- GNIS feature ID: 2584791

Plainfield is a census-designated place (CDP) comprising the main village of the town of Plainfield, Washington County, Vermont, United States. The population of the CDP was 401 at the 2010 census.

== Geography ==
According to the United States Census Bureau, the Plainfield CDP has a total area of 0.23 square miles (0.60 km^{2}), of which 0.23 square miles (0.59 km^{2}) is land and 0.004 square miles (0.01 km^{2}), or 2.18%, is water. The village is located in the northern corner of the town of Plainfield along U.S. Route 2, 10 miles (16 km) east of Montpelier, the state capital, and 28 miles (45 km) west of St. Johnsbury. Goddard College is located just to the west of the CDP.

Plainfield is located on the Winooski River.

== Education ==
The school district is Caledonia Central Supervisory Union.

The majority of the territory of Goddard College was in the Plainfield CDP.
