= Plainfield, Vermont =

- Town
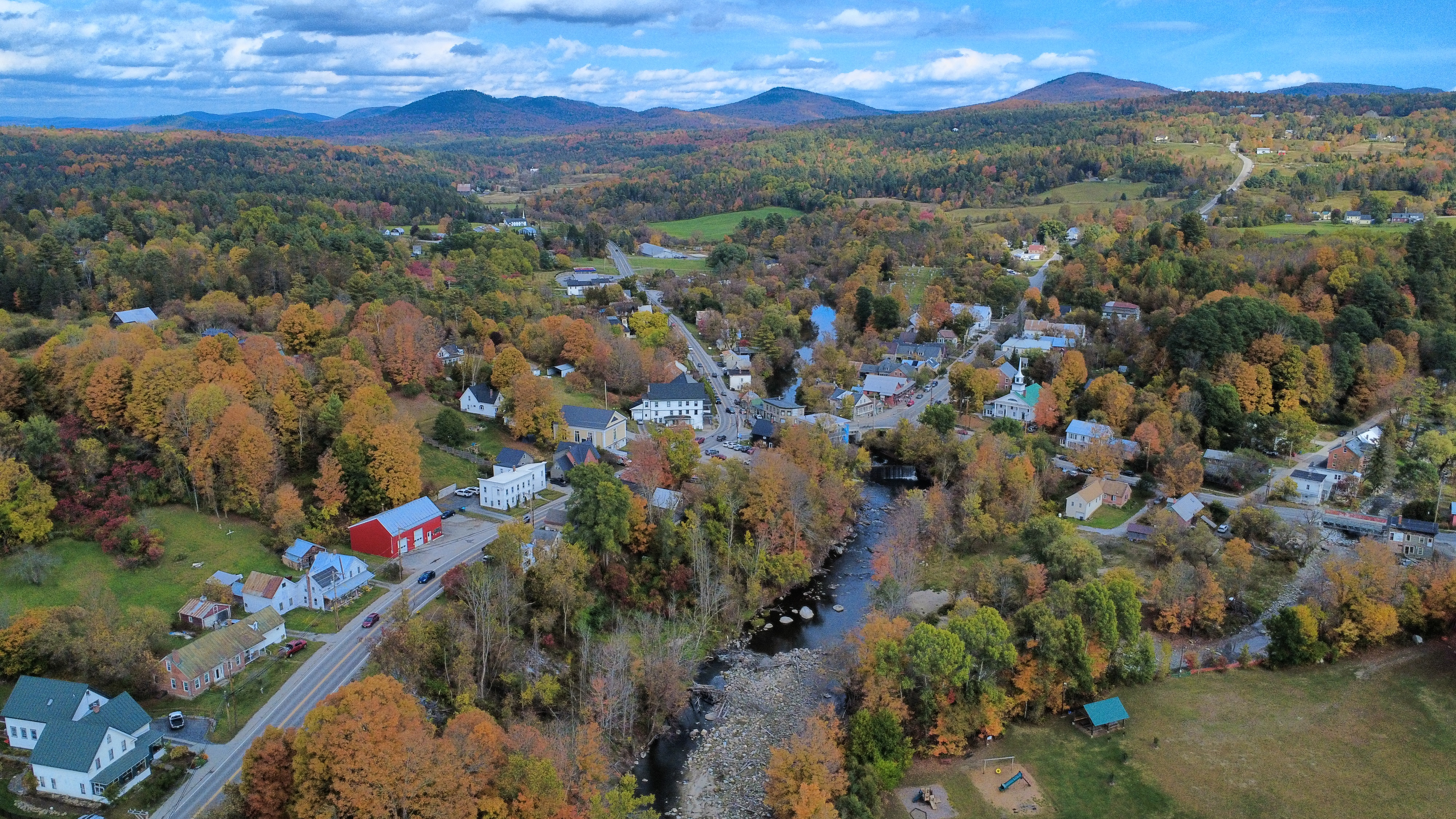
- Plainfield, Vermont, from the west

- Logo

- Location in Washington County and the state of Vermont
- Coordinates: 44°14′50″N 72°23′37″W
- Country: United States
- State: Vermont
- County: Washington
- Communities: Plainfield

Area
  - Total: 21.0 sq mi (54.5 km^{2})
  - Land: 21.0 sq mi (54.4 km^{2})
  - Water: 0.039 sq mi (0.1 km^{2})
- Elevation: 1,116 ft (340 m)

Population (2020)
  - Total: 1,236
  - Density: 58.8/sq mi (22.7/km^{2})
- Time zone: UTC-5 (Eastern (EST))
  - Summer (DST): UTC-4 (EDT)
- ZIP Codes: 05667 (Plainfield); 05641 (Barre)
- Area code: 802
- FIPS code: 50-55825
- GNIS feature ID: 1462175
- Website: www.plainfieldvt.gov

Plainfield, a town in Washington County, Vermont, United States was incorporated in 1867. The population was 1,236 at the 2020 census. Plainfield was the location of Goddard College.

== History ==
When the government of independent Vermont was being organized, the surveyor for northern Vermont, James Whitelaw, noticed that a parcel of land, smaller than the standard town size of six miles (10 km) square and lying between Montpelier and Marshfield, had not been granted to any settlers. One corner of this "gore" was marked as "St. Andrew's Corner". Whitelaw and his assistants were later paid for their work with land grants, one of which was the St. Andrews's gore.

Most of the land in St. Andrew's was later sold to Ira Allen. It was Allen's plan to rent the land in order to provide income for a college in Burlington, and he delegated that task to Jacob Davis, who sold the land to settlers instead. Litigation over the grants lasted for years. Davis eventually divided the rest of the gore into 320-acre lots.

Settlement began in the 1790s, and the population increased as land was cleared. A dam was built on the Winooski River and grist mills and sawmills were constructed. The area now known as Plainfield village was variously known as Mill Privilege, Mud Hollow, and Slab Holler. The name was later changed to Plainfield after the town of the same name in New Hampshire, hometown of settler John Chapman, who made his suggestion attractive by offering to provide the town with leather-bound record books. The town was incorporated as Plainfield in 1867, after the American Civil War.

The village experienced flooding in July 2023 and 2024. 28 homes damaged in those floods were bought out by the state. The residents of downtown decided to move en masse to land on a plateau sold by two willing owners.

The village of Plainfield, Wisconsin was named by its postmaster Elijah C. Waterman to honor his hometown of Plainfield, Vermont.

== Geography ==
According to the United States Census Bureau, the town has a total area of 21.0 square miles (54.5 km^{2}), of which 21.0 square miles (54.4 km^{2}) is land and 0.04 square mile (0.1 km^{2}) (0.19%) is water.

Plainfield, the primary village, is located in the northern corner of the town along the Winooski River and U.S. Route 2. Goddard College is located just west of the village. The ground rises to the east in the town, culminating at 3,030-foot-high (920 m) Spruce Mountain within Groton State Forest.

=== Climate ===
Climate data for Plainfield, Vermont, 1991–2020 normals, snowfall 2000-2020: 800ft (244m)
| Month | Jan | Feb | Mar | Apr | May | Jun | Jul | Aug | Sep | Oct | Nov | Dec | Year |
|---|---|---|---|---|---|---|---|---|---|---|---|---|---|
| Record high °F (°C) | 58 (14) | 68 (20) | 80 (27) | 89 (32) | 93 (34) | 98 (37) | 98 (37) | 96 (36) | 96 (36) | 82 (28) | 72 (22) | 65 (18) | 98 (37) |
| Mean maximum °F (°C) | 47 (8) | 50 (10) | 59 (15) | 79 (26) | 86 (30) | 91 (33) | 92 (33) | 90 (32) | 87 (31) | 76 (24) | 65 (18) | 51 (11) | 93 (34) |
| Mean daily maximum °F (°C) | 25.3 (−3.7) | 28.8 (−1.8) | 38.2 (3.4) | 51.7 (10.9) | 66.0 (18.9) | 75.0 (23.9) | 80.0 (26.7) | 78.3 (25.7) | 70.5 (21.4) | 55.7 (13.2) | 41.9 (5.5) | 30.6 (−0.8) | 53.5 (11.9) |
| Daily mean °F (°C) | 13.9 (−10.1) | 16.2 (−8.8) | 26.2 (−3.2) | 39.4 (4.1) | 52.3 (11.3) | 61.4 (16.3) | 66.5 (19.2) | 64.6 (18.1) | 56.6 (13.7) | 43.9 (6.6) | 32.5 (0.3) | 21.3 (−5.9) | 41.2 (5.1) |
| Mean daily minimum °F (°C) | 2.6 (−16.3) | 3.6 (−15.8) | 14.3 (−9.8) | 27.2 (−2.7) | 38.6 (3.7) | 47.9 (8.8) | 53.0 (11.7) | 50.9 (10.5) | 42.8 (6.0) | 32.2 (0.1) | 23.2 (−4.9) | 12.0 (−11.1) | 29.0 (−1.7) |
| Mean minimum °F (°C) | −19 (−28) | −15 (−26) | −8 (−22) | 15 (−9) | 26 (−3) | 36 (2) | 42 (6) | 41 (5) | 30 (−1) | 21 (−6) | 8 (−13) | −9 (−23) | −21 (−29) |
| Record low °F (°C) | −33 (−36) | −29 (−34) | −24 (−31) | 4 (−16) | 23 (−5) | 30 (−1) | 38 (3) | 35 (2) | 23 (−5) | 13 (−11) | −9 (−23) | −25 (−32) | −33 (−36) |
| Average precipitation inches (mm) | 2.73 (69) | 2.43 (62) | 2.61 (66) | 3.17 (81) | 3.58 (91) | 4.57 (116) | 4.67 (119) | 3.38 (86) | 3.45 (88) | 4.28 (109) | 2.82 (72) | 3.27 (83) | 40.96 (1,042) |
| Average snowfall inches (cm) | 15.4 (39) | 16.5 (42) | 12.8 (33) | 3.9 (9.9) | 0.3 (0.76) | 0.0 (0.0) | 0.0 (0.0) | 0.0 (0.0) | 0.0 (0.0) | 0.7 (1.8) | 5.9 (15) | 18.2 (46) | 73.7 (187.46) |
Source 1: NOAA
Source 2: XMACIS (snowfall, temp records & monthly max/mins)

== Demographics ==
Historical population
| Census | Pop. | Note | %± |
|---|---|---|---|
| 1800 | 256 | | — |
| 1810 | 543 | | 112.1% |
| 1820 | 660 | | 21.5% |
| 1830 | 874 | | 32.4% |
| 1840 | 880 | | 0.7% |
| 1850 | 808 | | −8.2% |
| 1860 | 822 | | 1.7% |
| 1870 | 726 | | −11.7% |
| 1880 | 729 | | 0.4% |
| 1890 | 745 | | 2.2% |
| 1900 | 716 | | −3.9% |
| 1910 | 785 | | 9.6% |
| 1920 | 781 | | −0.5% |
| 1930 | 766 | | −1.9% |
| 1940 | 832 | | 8.6% |
| 1950 | 945 | | 13.6% |
| 1960 | 966 | | 2.2% |
| 1970 | 1,399 | | 44.8% |
| 1980 | 1,249 | | −10.7% |
| 1990 | 1,302 | | 4.2% |
| 2000 | 1,286 | | −1.2% |
| 2010 | 1,243 | | −3.3% |
| 2020 | 1,236 | | −0.6% |
U.S. Decennial Census

As of the census of 2000, there were 1,286 people, 487 households, and 317 families residing in the town. The population density was 61.2 people per square mile (23.6/km^{2}). There were 520 housing units at an average density of 24.8 per square mile (9.6/km^{2}). The racial makeup of the town was 96.42% White, 0.78% African American, 0.86% Native American, 0.47% Asian, 0.39% from other races, and 1.09% from two or more races. Hispanic or Latino of any race were 1.40% of the population.

There were 487 households, out of which 37.0% had children under the age of 18 living with them, 48.9% were couples living together and joined in either marriage or civil union, 10.9% had a female householder with no husband present, and 34.9% were non-families. 25.7% of all households were made up of individuals, and 8.2% had someone living alone who was 65 years of age or older. The average household size was 2.42 and the average family size was 2.93.

In the town, the population was spread out, with 23.7% under the age of 18, 12.9% from 18 to 24, 28.8% from 25 to 44, 24.4% from 45 to 64, and 10.1% who were 65 years of age or older. The median age was 36 years. For every 100 females, there were 94.3 males. For every 100 females age 18 and over, there were 90.1 males.

The median income for a household in the town was $38,750, and the median income for a family was $42,813. Males had a median income of $30,789 versus $29,750 for females. The per capita income for the town was $17,980. About 7.6% of families and 10.9% of the population were below the poverty line, including 9.2% of those under age 18 and 17.5% of those age 65 or over.

== Culture ==
Although Plainfield is similar to many other rural New England towns by the numbers (size, population, etc.), it has a distinct flair which sets it apart from most surrounding communities. Goddard College attracted a liberal, educated population that at one time made up a significant portion of the townspeople until it closed in 2024. Goddard alumni include Mumia Abu-Jamal, members of the band Phish, David Mamet, Piers Anthony, Mary Edwards, onetime State historian H. Allen Soule Jr., and abstract artists including Robert M. Fisher and James Gahagan. Plainfield was home to noted composer and builder of the first American village style gamelan, Dennis Murphy.

The town currently has two restaurants; one located in the village center with New York-style pizza, and the other a cafe on US Route 2. The village also has a community food co-op and community center open to non-members and featuring local products, a used bookshop, and a community maintained flower garden, all within several hundred feet of each other. The town has a unique public library, the Cutler Memorial Library, and is home to an environmentally progressive biodiesel station. Plainfield is also home to the historic Allenwood Farm.

Plainfield's atmosphere is distinct from popular tourist destinations in Vermont such as Stowe, and Woodstock in that its commercial activity is generated primarily by local residents. There are a number of active local groups such as the Plainfield Historical Society and the Plainfield Area Community Association, which sponsor community activities, like the annual Old Home Days.

Plainfield, like a number of Vermont towns, retains the influence of the back-to-the-land movement of the 1960s. A number of people came to stay for good and continue to run organic farms. This older generation has now joined with the newer, younger sustainable agriculture movement and the food renaissance in Vermont. While the college, Goddard, has suffered a decline in recent years, the town nevertheless retains an ethos of activism, community and solidarity (except on Town Meeting day when everyone voices their opinion loudly). Community spirit and solidarity was demonstrated in 2013, when the town raised the most money per capita for Vermont Public Radio and thus earned an Ice Cream Social from Ben and Jerry's. The radio station housed at Goddard College, WGDR, continues to serve as a community voice and link for area residents. The newly renovated Plainfield Town Hall Opera House (c. 1841) boasts a footprint of 55' 9" along the eaves, 42' 4" across the gables, and is a popular destination for local concerts and performances.

== Government ==
Plainfield's board of selectmen is made up of five members (2025):

- Patti Jamele
- Frances Rose Subbiondo
- Karl Bissex
- Peter Youngbaer
- Dan Fingas

== Education ==
The school district is Caledonia Central Supervisory Union.

The majority of the property of Goddard College was in this town.

== Notable people ==
- Trey Anastasio, musician, lead vocalist for Phish
- Piers Anthony, writer in the science fiction and fantasy genres
- Mary Azarian, woodcut artist and children's book illustrator
- Robert M. Fisher, artist
- James Gahagan, artist
- Louise Gluck, Nobel Prize winning poet
- William H. Macy, actor, teacher, and director, in theater, film, and television
- David Mamet, playwright, screenwriter, director, poet, essayist and novelist
- Page McConnell, pianist, organist, and keyboardist for Phish
- Dennis Murphy, composer, musician, instrument maker and artist
- Archie Shepp, jazz saxophonist
- Stephen C. Shurtleff, attorney and Democratic politician, lived in Plainfield
- Thomas Yamamoto, artist
