= Alan Wood (footballer, born 1954) =

English footballer

Personal information
- Full name: Alan Ernest Wood
- Date of birth: 1 December 1954 (age 71)
- Place of birth: Gravesend, England
- Position: Central defender

Senior career*
Years	Team	Apps	(Gls)
1972–1973	Charlton Athletic	1	(0)
1973–1974	Dover	?	(?)
- * Club domestic league appearances and goals

Alan Ernest Wood (born 1 December 1954) is an English former professional footballer who played for Charlton Athletic and Dover as a central defender.
