= Robert M. Fisher =

American artist (1928–2007)

Robert Miles Fisher (November 12, 1928 – August 19, 2007) was an American abstract artist in oils, watercolor, charcoal, and welded sculpture.

== Biography ==
Born in Cleveland, Ohio, Robert moved to Plainfield, Vermont in 1946, and began attending Goddard College. It took him eight years to finish his degree, as he worked his way through college. Robert's degree thesis at Goddard was on international communities. He was not yet painting seriously until moving to New York City, where he was offered the opportunity to work with Hans Hofmann at his New York School.

In the 1950s and early 1960s Robert received two large commissions to work for other sculptors, Ibram Lassaw (one of the founders of the Abstract Artists Association) and Herbert Ferber. He went on to produce welded sculptures of his own, exhibiting in juried shows, selling, and receiving commissions, notably for a "...large stainless steel piece in which the mirror finish ... picked up the reflected the colors of the sun and fall leaves." Robert considered this "...to be a piece using modern techniques and materials, yet following the ancient polychromatic form of the Greeks and Egyptians."

Mid-1960s, Robert moved back to Vermont permanently, so he could live less expensively and thus devote more time to creative endeavors. That did not stop him from getting involved in the Civil Rights Movement. By the end of the 60's, he spent a total of two years working in Mississippi, most of it helping develop cooperatives for low income people. He continued such community work until his death, mostly working with groups serving low income families and children, and organizations helping the families of those in prison. One example of such ongoing outreach work is "Street Angel Diaries." Robert donated the rights to use "about thirty" of his paintings of street people to help raise awareness of the plight of the homeless. "Street Angels" is a multimedia project first presented in 2005 in Los Angeles, to great critical acclaim. In 2006, the program was presented eight times at the Boston Court Theater in Pasadena, CA, and in 2007 in Cape Cod. Robert had "...been doing paintings of street people on and off for many years."

Through the 1970s and up to 1986, Robert produced shows in Vermont and on the Cape, received commissions for welded sculpture, taught at the University of Vermont and at Goddard College, and continued to work in charcoal, oils, and watercolor. In autumn 1986, this rhythm was disrupted when Robert fell from a scaffold upon which he was painting and broke his back. Roberts was not paralyzed from the fall due to the then experimental spinal clip procedure, seven weeks in hospital and six months in a full upper body cast. He was able to return to work, but it was almost a decade before he regained full mobility, and he never did regain his former vigor.

In 2000, PBS aired nationally a documentary "Hans Hoffmann: artist/teacher, teacher/artist," directed by Madeline Amgout and narrated by Robert De Niro. Robert Fisher appeared in the program five times, and tried to offer to the audience "...some idea of the humor and joy (Hans) brought to his teaching."

Robert was working on a number of projects at the time of his death. One was a proposed book about Ibram Lassaw, William, and Hans Hofmann and their major role in helping America become aware of and accept non-objective modern art, working with Ibram's daughter Denise. He had photos of the men that have never appeared in print, and was planning to include them in the book. Another project was tentatively titled "Ancient Bottle, New Wine: The Impact of Hans Hofmann and His New York City Mosaic Murals on the World of Modern Art." The Hofmann murals (on 711 Third Avenue and on West 49th) consumed a year of Han's creative life, yet are largely overlooked despite their providing an enlightening window into his theory of "Pure Color."

Robert stated that "... as important to me as Hofmann's artistic theories and techniques were, perhaps even more crucial was one of Hofmann's stellar statements, that "There are a thousand talents in the world, but it takes work to become an artist." In times when there seemed to be reason to be discouraged with my choice of following his path of work, his words left me not overly disturbed at lack of either recognition or of great leaps of progression."

== Works ==
Fisher's work has been exhibited in New York, Provincetown, San Francisco, and Los Angeles, where his series on "Street Angels" was well received. Some other notable exhibits include "USA on Paper," Copenhagen (1990), a traveling show in the Czech Republic (Gallery Zouf and Friends, 1993), and his last show, "" (Gallery, Burlington, Vermont).

His works are part of the permanent collection in the Cape Cod Museum of Art in Dennis, Massachusetts, and in Provincetown Museum.

Robert's works can be found in homes and with collectors across the USA and in Europe, although he hated to sell "his children."
