= Allenwood Farm =

- U.S. National Register of Historic Places
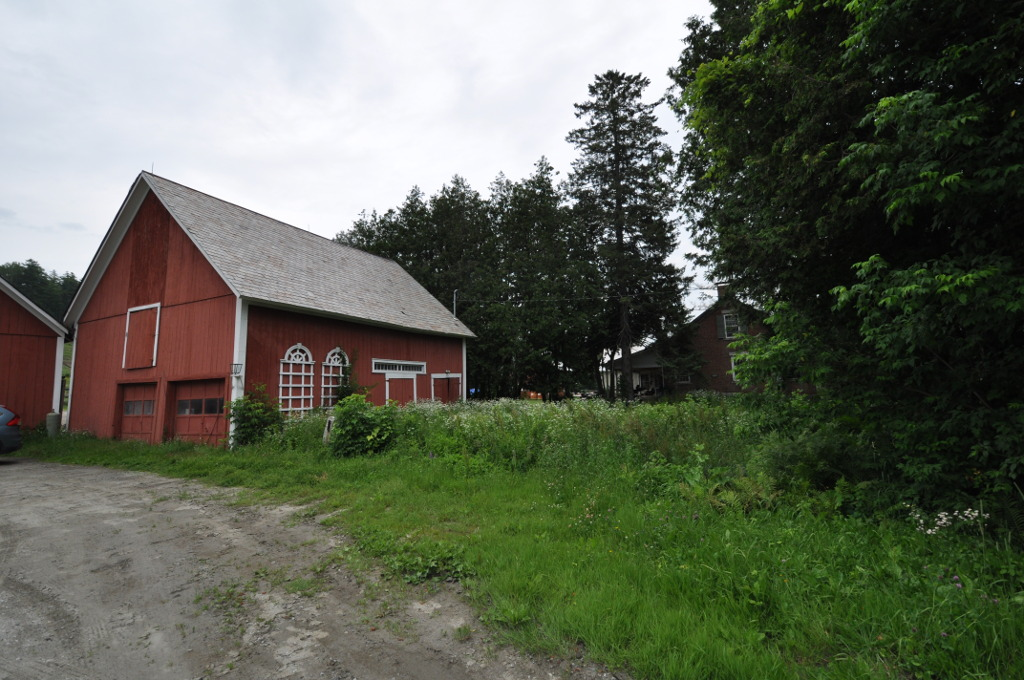
- One of the farm's barns

- Location within Vermont Location within the United States
- Location: US 2, Plainfield, Vermont
- Coordinates: 44°16′42″N 72°26′2″W
- Area: 2.5 acres (1.0 ha)
- Built: 1827
- Built by: Martin, Allen
- Architectural style: Greek Revival, Federal
- NRHP reference No.: 83004229
- Added to NRHP: December 22, 1983

The Allenwood Farm is a historic farm property on United States Route 2 in Plainfield, Vermont. Developed in 1827 by Allen Martin, the son of an early settler, it is a well-preserved example of a transitional Federal-Greek Revival detached farmstead. It was listed on the National Register of Historic Places in 1983.

== Description and history ==
Allenwood Farm is located at the western edge of Plainfield village, on the north side of United States Route 2 just east of its junction with Vermont Route 214. The farm property, spanning over 50 acres, consists of rolling fields arrayed on three sides of the farm complex. Included in that complex are a renovated farmhouse, a year-round cottage, an 8600 square foot insulated riding arena, two barns, and several smaller outbuildings. The farmhouse, set close to the road but screened by a dense growth of hedge-like trees, is a 1-1/2 story brick Cape style structure, five bays wide and three deep, with a side gable roof. It has Greek Revival window treatments, and a Greek Revival door topped by a Federal style frieze and flanked by sidelight windows. The interior retains a similar combination of original woodwork. To the house's northwest are two barns of 19th-century construction, one of which may be older than the house.

The farm property is part of land acquired around the turn of the 19th century by Jesse Martin, a veteran of the American Revolutionary War. The brick house was built in 1827 by his son Allen, and has remained since then in the hands of his descendants. A wing of the house, of log construction, may have been built by Jesse Martin; it was known in the family as Allen's Cottage, and was where Jesse Martin lived the last few years of his life. Allen Martin's grandnephew, Willard S. Martin, Jr., was a successful businessman who developed the opulent Greatwood estate on land west of the farmstead; it is now the Goddard College Greatwood Campus.

== See also ==
- National Register of Historic Places listings in Washington County, Vermont
