= Alan Wood (footballer, born 1900) =

English footballer

Personal information
- Full name: Alan Esplin Wood
- Date of birth: 1900
- Place of birth: Walsall, England
- Position: Winger

Senior career*
Years	Team	Apps	(Gls)
1918–1919	Talbot Stead Tube Works		
1920–1922	Crystal Palace	35	(9)
1922–1925	Coventry City	82	(17)
1925	Willenhall		
Total		117	(26)
- * Club domestic league appearances and goals

Alan Esplin Wood (1900 – after 1924) was an English footballer who played in the Football League for Coventry City and Crystal Palace.
