= Spirit of Aggieland =

Song

The Spirit of Aggieland is the alma mater of the Texas A&M University. It was originally written as a poem by Marvin H. Mimms while he was a student at Texas A&M. Richard J. Dunn, the director of the Fightin' Texas Aggie Band at the time, composed the music. Students, faculty, and former students of the A&M sing the song at Aggie sporting events, Muster, and other events.

The song was used as a wakeup call on Day 10 of space mission STS-124 for Texas A&M former student and mission specialist Mike Fossum.

== Lyrics (Original) ==
Some may boast of prowess bold
Of the school they think so grand
But there's a spirit can ne'er be told
It's the Spirit of Aggieland.

'Chorus:'
We are the Aggies - the Aggies are we
True to each other as Aggies can be
We've got to FIGHT boys
We've got to fight!
We've got to fight for Maroon and White
After they've boosted all the rest
They will come and join the best
For we are the Aggies - the Aggies are we
We're from Texas A.M.C.

A yell sequence follows; traditionally omitted at Muster.

T-E-X-A-S A-G-G-I-E
Fight! Fight! Fight-fight-fight!
Fight! Maroon! White-White-White!
A-G-G-I-E
Texas! Texas! A-M-C!
Gig 'em, Aggies, 1-2-3
Farmers fight! Farmers fight!
Fight! Fight!
Farmers, farmers fight!
(all students perform their wildcat)

=== Lyrical change ===
The official lyrics for the last two lines of the chorus are "For we are the Aggies - the Aggies so true; We're from Texas A.M.U." These changes were made following the school's name change in 1963 from the Agricultural and Mechanical College of Texas (Texas A.M.C.) to Texas A&M University. The revised lyrics are used by choral groups on campus except for the Singing Cadets, which sings the original lyrics. However, students usually sing the original lyrics out of respect for the history of Texas A&M.

== Additional meaning ==
The Spirit of Aggieland also refers to the "spirit can ne'er be told." Many people describe Texas A&M University as having a unique school spirit that "From the outside looking in, you can't understand it. And from the inside looking out, you can't explain it." It has perhaps best been stated by Eric Opiela, a former Vice Student Body President of the rival University of Texas at Austin, when discussing the loss of life in the 1999 Texas A&M Bonfire collapse:

I learned something tonight. For all us Longhorns who discount A&M in our neverending rivalry, we need to realize one thing. Aggieland is a special place, with special people. It is infinitely better equipped than us at dealing with a tragedy such as this for one simple reason. It is a family. It is a family that cares for its own, a family that reaches out, a family that is unified in the face of adversity; a family that moved this Longhorn to tears. My heart, my prayers, and the heart of the UT student body go out tonight to Aggies and their family and friends as they recover from this great loss. Texas A&M, The Eyes of Texas are Upon You--and they look with sincere sympathy upon a family that has been through so much tragedy this semester.

— Eric Opiela

In the wake of the Virginia Tech shooting in 2007 that killed 32 people, Texas A&M and Texas also united and created shirts as both a tribute and fundraiser. The front read "Orange and Maroon support Orange and Maroon", in reference to Virginia Tech sharing maroon as a color with Texas A&M and orange as a school color with Texas. The back, meanwhile, read, "The Eyes of Texas are upon you / For your spirit can ne'er be told / In times of greatest tragedy / You have a hand to hold", referencing both "The Eyes of Texas" and "Spirit of Aggieland".

== See also ==
- Traditions of Texas A&M University
